= Kaja (name) =

Female given name and family name

Kaja or Kája is a given name and surname.

Kaja also has several root name derivations. In Polish, it is a feminine given name that is a diminutive form of Karolina, a derivative of Karl . Kája is a Czech unisex given name that is a diminutive form of Karolína, Karla and Karel, also derivatives of Karl. In Slovene, Kaja is often a diminutive form of Kajetana, Karla and Katarina, names deriving from Caietanus (Cajetan), Karl and Aikaterine, respectively. It is also a Danish, Finnish, German, Norwegian and Swedish feminine given name that is a diminutive form of Katherina, Karen and Katrine as well as an alternate form of Kaia, all derived from Aikaterine. In Estonian, Kaja is a form of Katariina, but it also means "echo".

Kaja is one of the variants of the name Katarina, which originally comes from the Greek name Haikaterine of unclear meaning. According to one interpretation, the name is derived from the Greek word hekateros, meaning "each of both". According to another theory, the name has its origin in the Greek word katharos (purity). It is also mentioned as a derivative of the name of the goddess of death and witchcraft Hekate.

Notable people referred to by this name include the following:

== Given name ==
- Kaja Draksler (born 1987), Slovenian pianist and composer
- Kaja Eržen (born 1994), Slovenian football player
- Kaja Foglio (born 1970), American writer, artist, and publisher
- Kaja Grobelna (born 1995), Belgian volleyball player of Polish origin
- Kaja Gunnufsen (born 1989), Norwegian singer and songwriter
- Kaja Jerina (born 1992), Slovenian football player
- Kaja Juvan (born 2000), Slovenian tennis player
- Kaja Kajzer (born 2000), Slovenian judoka
- Kaja Kallas (born 1977), Estonian politician
- Kaja Korošec (born 2001), Slovenian football player
- Kaja Kreisman (born 1968), Estonian politician
- Kaja Juvan (born 2000), Slovenian tennis player
- Kaja Martin, American actor, comedian, writer, director, and film producer
- Kaja Norbye (born 1999), Norwegian alpine skier
- Kaja Norum (born 1989), Norwegian model and figurativist painter
- Kaja Rogulj (born 1986), Croatian football player
- Kája Saudek (1935–2015), Czech comics illustrator and graphic artist
- Kaja Silverman (born 1947), American art historian and critical theorist
- Kaja Skrzek (born 1998), Polish diver
- Kaja Tael (born 1960), Estonian philologist, translator, and diplomat
- Kaja Verdnik (born 1999), Slovenian snowboarder
- Kaja Ziomek (born 1997), Polish speed skater

== Nickname ==
- Karoline "Kaja" Eidé Norena (1884–1968), Norwegian soprano

== Surname ==
- Demasq Kaja (died 1327), a member of the Chobanid family
- Egli Kaja (born 1997), Albanian football player
- Ervis Kaja (born 1987), Albanian football player
- Florina Kaja (born 1982), American reality television personality
- Jan Kaja (born 1957), Polish painter
- Ryszard Kaja (1962–2019), Polish artist, stage designer, and costume designer

== See also ==
- Kaja (disambiguation)
- Mila Kajas
- Kaia (name)
- Kaija
- Kaj (name)
- Kaji (surname)
