= Hasan Buzurg =

Founder of Jalayirid

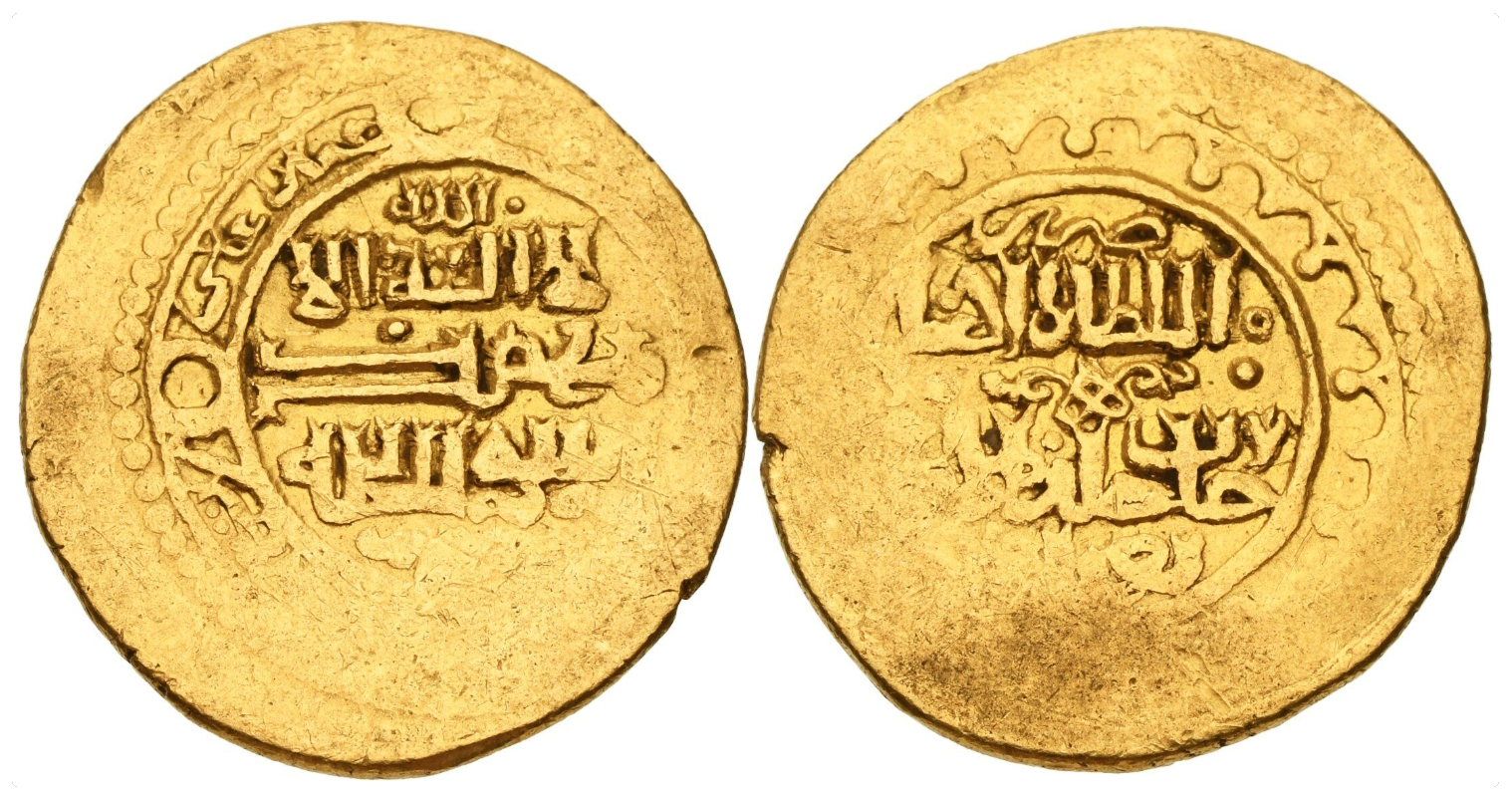
- Jalayrids coinage, time of Shaykh Hasan Buzurg. Baghdad mint. Dated AH 749? (AD 1348-9). Reverse legend in Arabic al-sultan al-a‘zam /khan khallada mulkahu “The Supreme Sultan, the Khan — may his kingdom endure forever.”

Viceroy of Anatolia
- Predecessor: Amir Mahmud
- Successor: Eretna
- Died: July 1356
- Burial: Najaf, Jalayirid Sultanate
- Spouse: Baghdad Khatun; Dilshad Khatun; Daughter of Amir Muhammad Beg of the Oirats
- Issue: Shaykh Uways Jalayir; Amir Qasim; Amir Zahid; Amir Ilkan
Names
- Tāj al-Dīn Ḥasan b. Amīr Ḥusayn Gūrkān Jalāyrī
- Family: Jalayirids
- Father: Amir Husain Jalayir
- Mother: Chinggisid princess Öljetei Khatun

Shaikh Hasan (Persian: تاج الدين حسن بن امير حسين گوركان جلايرى, romanized: Tāj al-Dīn Ḥasan b. Amīr Ḥusayn Gūrkān Jalāyrī), also known as "Hasan Buzurg" ("Hasan The Great"), Hassan the Jalair or Hassan-e Uljatâï was the first of several de facto independent Jalayirid rulers of Iraq and central Iran.

== Early years ==
He was born to Amir Husain Jalayir and Öljetei Khatun, daughter of Arghun Khan. His sister Soyurghatmish Khatun was married to Öljaitü Khan. He probably lived with his father during his governorate of Arran (c. 1312) and Khorasan (c. 1322). Hasan Buzurg was married to Baghdad Khatun in 1323, the daughter of Amir Chupan. Chupan was the most influential person at the court of Abu Sa'id Bahadur. However, the Ilkhan soon became enamored with Baghdad Khatun, and asked Hasan Buzurg to divorce her. Chupan sent the two of them to Qarabagh in an attempt to rid Baghdad Khatun from Abu Sa'id's mind, but the effort failed, and Baghdad Khatun was forced to marry the Ilkhan. After the murder of Chupan in 1327, Baghdad Khatun and the Grand Vizier Ghiyas al-Din ibn Rashid al-Din competed for influence over Abu Sa'id. Ghiyas al-Din spread a rumor that Baghdad Khatun and Hasan Buzurg were plotting against the Ilkhan; Hasan Buzurg was arrested in 1331. His mother Öljetei convinced the Ilkhan to spare his life, and he was imprisoned in the castle of Kemah instead. In 1332, however, his name was cleared and he was dispatched as governor to Rûm. During Abu Sa'id's lifetime, Hasan Buzurg was also called upon by Ghiyas al-Din to help stop rampant tax abuses in eastern Iran.

== Kingmakership ==
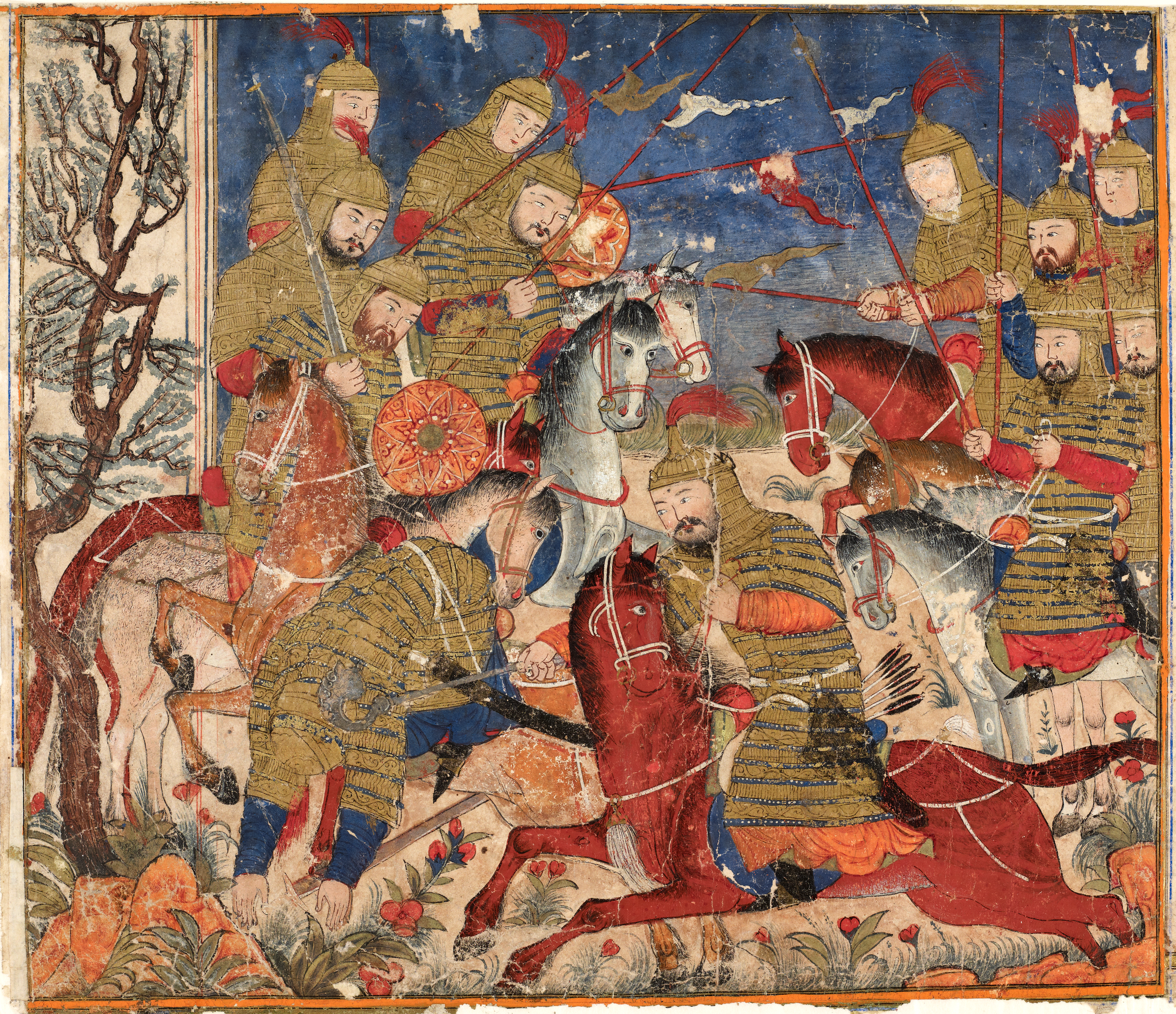
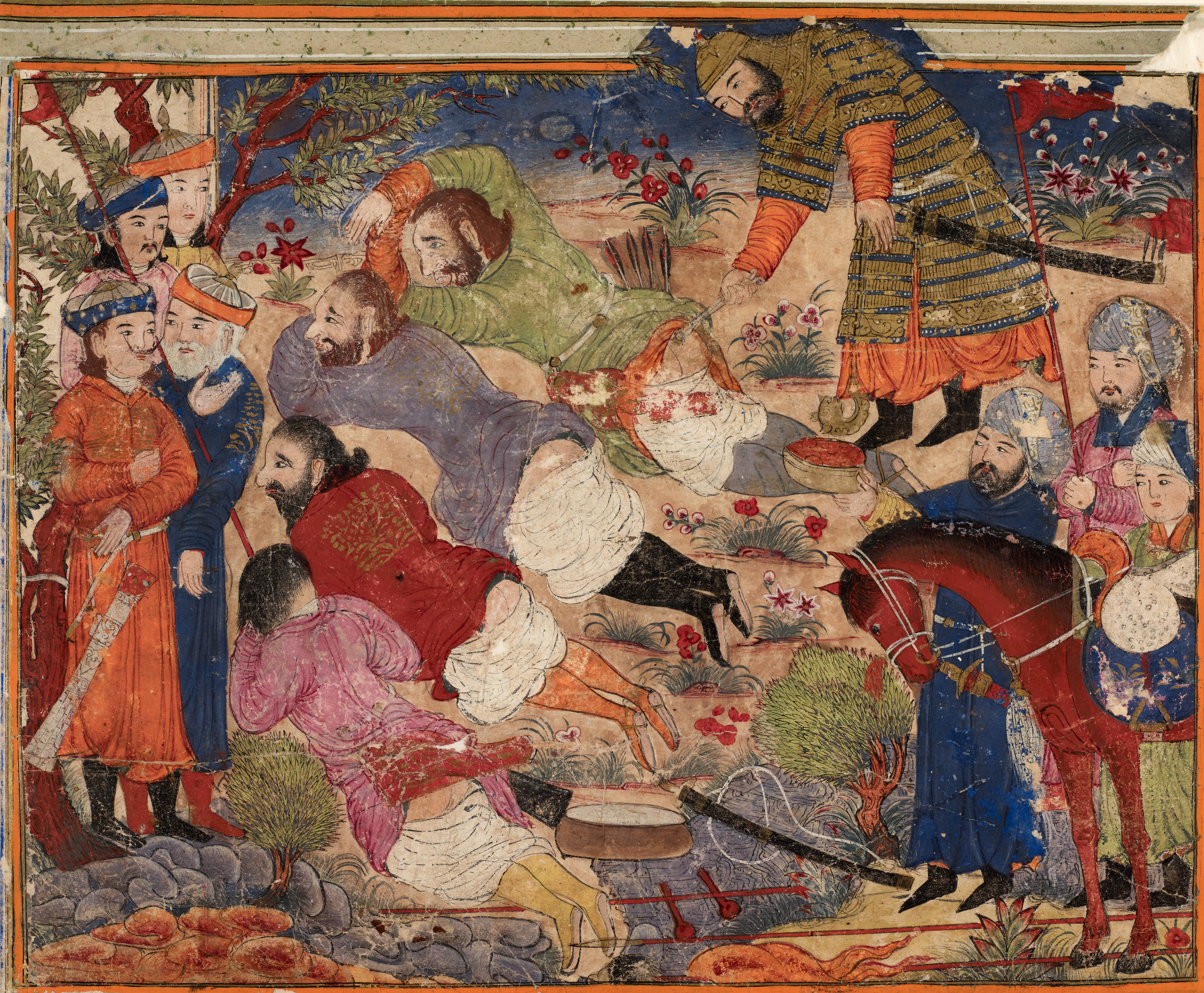
Jalayirid equestrian combat scene and capture of prisoners. Great Jalayirid Shāhnāma, Diez Albums, c. 1335–1355, at the time of Hasan Buzurg. SBB-PK, Diez A.

=== Reign of Arpa Ke'un ===
Following the death of Abu Said in 1335, several parties competed for the Ilkhanid throne. Hasan stood neutral throughout the reign of Arpa, he became supreme commander of Ilkhanate armies. However, Arpa's rule was not accepted by a part of Oirats, whose leader and the governor of Baghdad - Ali Padshah was an uncle of Abu Said and had his own designs on throne. Claiming Abu Said's wife Dilshad Khatun was still pregnant, he raised Musa, the grandson of Baydu as rightful heir to the throne. Oirat traditional rivalry with Ariq Böke's line could also be a factor in this rebellion.

=== Reign of Muhammad ===
After defeat of Arpa by Ali Padshah on 29 April 1336 and subsequent murder on 15 May 1336, Hasan Buzurg saw his chance and raised a child, Pir Husayn from Tabriz, a great-grandson of Möngke Temür, to claim the position in alliance with Hajji Taghay, the Sutaid claimant to Diyar Bakr in opposition to Ali Padshah. Pir Husayn was crowned in Anatolia on 20 July 1336 with the title "Muhammad Khan" and Hasan left for Iran, leaving his deputy Eretna behind to act as governor. Later on 24 July Hasan Buzurg and Muhammad met the forces of Musa Khan and 'Ali Padshah in Battle of Qara Darra, near Ala-Tagh area; Musa was defeated and 'Ali Padshah killed. Hasan Buzurg pursued Musa on his way to Baghdad and created many losses for his enemy. He then proceeded to Tabriz where he put Muhammad on throne and married the granddaughter of Chupan and widow of Abu Sa'id, Dilshad Khatun, who had given birth to Abu Sa'id's posthumous daughter on 18 May 1336.

Meanwhile, the amirs in Khurasan adopted their own candidate for Ilkhan, Togha Temür. Togha set off in 1337 to subdue western Persia. Azarbaijan and 'Iraq-i 'Ajam were taken. In March he arrived before Sultaniyeh, the former capital of the Ilkhans, and Hasan Buzurg withdrew to Arran. Musa's forces, initially battling Togha's, now joined the invader. Togha and Musa met Hasan Buzurg at Soghurlug in the Maragheh area on 15 June 1337; Hasan defeated them, took Musa and Togha Temür's emir Shaykh Ali prisoner shortly after, and executed them on 10 July 1337. Togha gave up the campaign and withdrew to eastern Persia. With Muhammad's and Hasan's position solidified, Eretna was appointed governor of Anatolia. Hasan spent the winter of 1338 in Mughan.

Shortly afterwards, however, several descendants of Chupan united under his grandson Hassan Kuchak, who used a slave called Qara Juri to impersonate his father Timurtash in order to legitimatize his cause. Hasan didn't really pay attention when Eretna warned him of the emergence of "False Timurtash" in Karahisar. The Chobanids battled with Hasan Buzurg on July 16, 1338, at Naushahr in the Alatagh area. Hasan Buzurg was defeated; his puppet khan, Muhammad, was killed.

=== Reigns of Toga Temür, Jahan Temür, Sati Beg and Suleyman ===
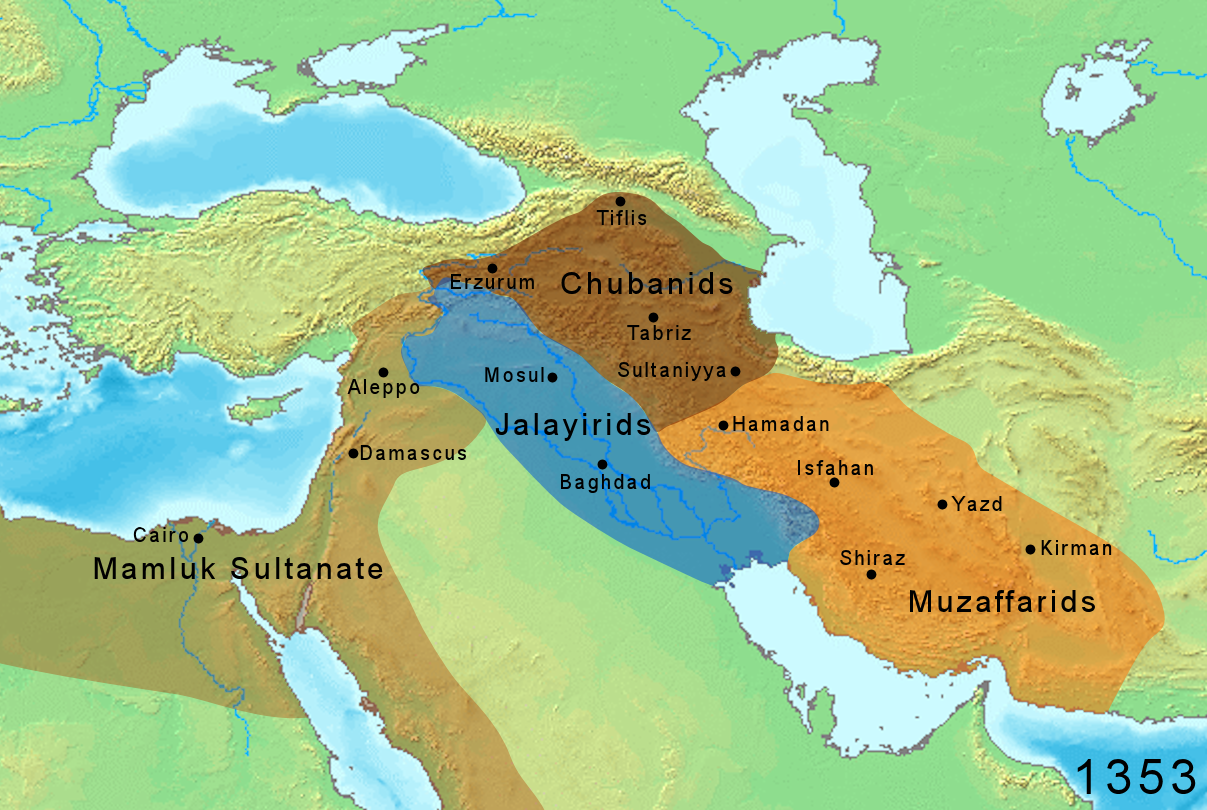
Jalayirid territory in 1353

Shortly after defeat by the Chobanids, Qara Juri was dismissed by Hassan Kuchak and was later routed by Hasan Buzurg. Peace was declared in late 1338, Hasan Buzurg lost Azerbaijan to Hasan Kuchak and Anatolia to Malik Ashraf. Despite all loss Hasan Buzurg retained control of Diyar Bakr, Iraq, Khuzestan and Baghdad. Nevertheless, he sought to be rid of the Chobanid threat. He offered the Ilkhanid throne to Togha Temür, who invaded early in 1339. Hassan Kuchak, however, offered the hand of Sati Beg in marriage and handing over the province of Iraqi Arab when Togha responded warmly to the proposal, he forwarded the letters to Hasan Buzurg. The latter, enraged, halted his expedition to support Togha, who was forced to withdraw during the summer of that year.

Following his abandonment of Togha Temur, Hasan Buzurg recognized Jahan Temür, a grandson of Gaykhatu, as Ilkhan near Hamadan. The conflict with the Chobanids again boiled over, and Hasan Buzurg and Jahan Temur met Hassan Kuchak and his new puppet Suleiman Khan in battle on the Jaghatu. There Hasan Buzurg was defeated on June 26, 1340. He fled to Baghdad; following which he deposed Jahan Temür. With the Chobanids continuing to press him, Hasan Buzurg this time turned to Mamluk Sultanate. He promised Baghdad and Diyar Bakr in return of Mamluk military assistance and capture of Azerbaijan for himself. In 1341, Sutayid Barhashin (son of Hajji Taghay) and Ibrahimshah (nephew of Hajji Taghay) was sent to Aleppo, court of al-Nasir as emissaries. The alliance was a success at first but was later broken thanks to cunning of Hasan Kuchek, who instructed Artuqid ruler of Mardin al-Malik as-Salih to write a letter to Mamluk sultan on alleged Jalayirid truce with Chobanids, advising not to aid Hasan Buzurg. In return, al-Malik was promised that his son-in-law Ibrahim Shah Sutayid would be granted Diyar Bakr instead of pro-Jalayirid Hajji Taghay.

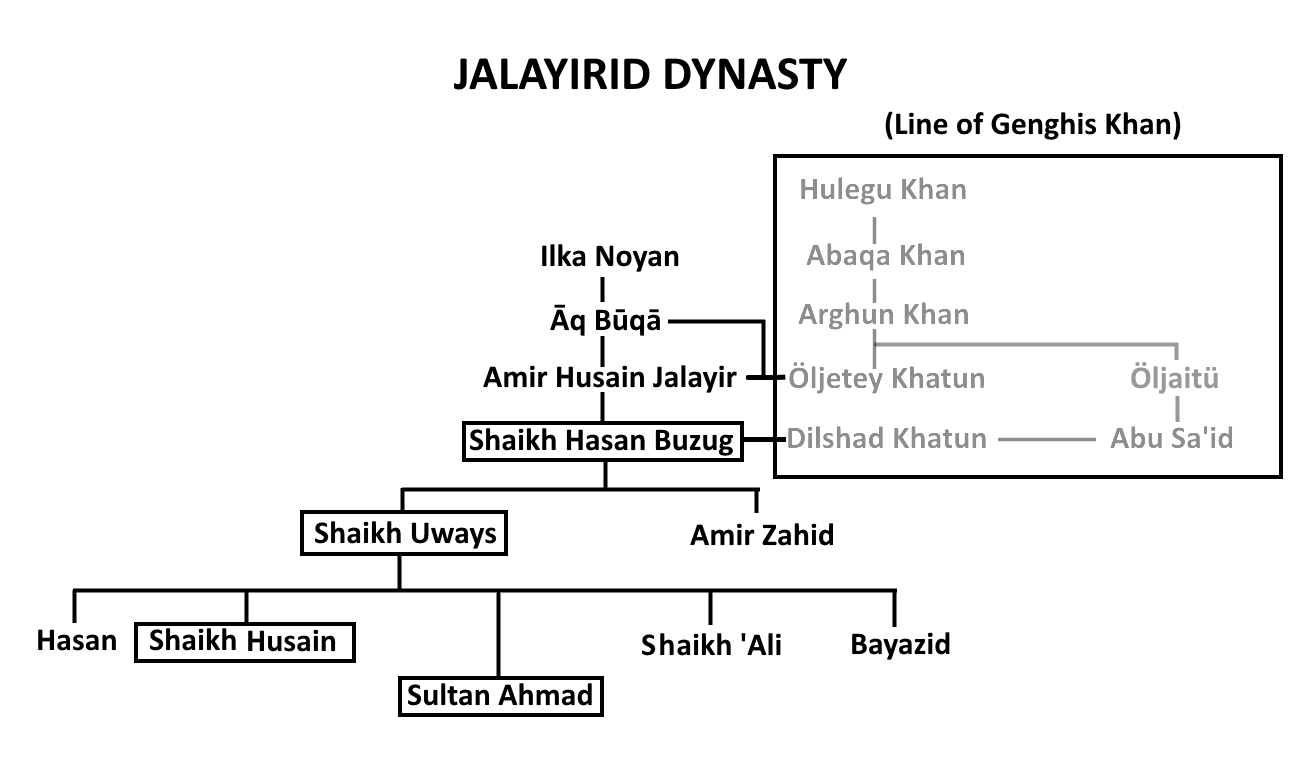
Jalayirid dynasty, and contribution from the line of Genghis Khan.

Hasan Buzurg for some time again recognized Togha Temur's suzerainty, and struck coins in his name. After he stopped recognizing Togha in 1344, he still did not proclaim himself independent, and ruled with the title of ulus beg, as a mere governor, simply leaving the Ilkhan throne unfilled. Nevertheless, this marks the beginning of effectively independent Jalayirid rule.

For the rest of his reign, Hasan Buzurg attempted to deal with the Chobanids. He managed to form an alliance with Hassan Kuchak's uncle Surgan, as well as the governor of Diyarbakır and the Mamluk Sultanate, but Surgan was soon convinced to abandon the alliance, and the Mamelukes withdrew shortly after. He also offered assistance to another of Hassan Kuchak's uncles, Yagi Basti, as well as to Mas’ud Shah of the Injuids, in their attempt to expel Hassan Kuchak's cousin Pir Hosayn from Shiraz. The murder of Hassan Kuchak in 1343 did not provide much relief, for his brother Malek Ashraf sent an army to conquer Baghdad in 1347. Jalayirid forces, however, inflicted heavy losses on the force, which was forced to retreat by the summer. While Malek Ashraf and the Chobanids would survive until 1357, their threat to the Jalayirids was diminished. Hasan Buzurg continued to play an influential part in Persian politics; he assisted the Injuid Abu Ishaq against the Muzaffarids, helping him restore his rule in Isfahan in 1353. The latter, however, destroyed the Injuids in 1357.

Hasan Buzurg died in July 1356 and was buried in Najaf. He was succeeded by his son, Shaikh Awais Jalayir.

== Family ==
He was married at least three times:

1. Baghdad Khatun (married in 1323, divorced in 1327) — daughter of Chupan, married to Abu Sa'id in 1327
2. Dilshad Khatun (married in 1336) — daughter of Demasq Kaja (son of Chupan) and Tursin Khatun (daughter of Irinjin and Könchek Khatun)
  - Shaykh Uways Jalayir (1342 - 1374)
  - Amir Qasim (d. 1367–68)
  - Amir Zahid (b. 3 August 1351 - d. 1371–72)
  - Several daughters, about whom the sources record little
3. A daughter of Amir Muhammad Beg of the Oirats, brother of Ali Padshah (m. 1338)

With unknown wives or concubines:

- A daughter was married to Amir Yusufshah — governor of Mughan and Barum
- Amir Ilkan — a commander in the Jalayirid army
- Vafā Qutlugh — married to Qara Muhammad of Qara Qoyunlu by Sultan Ahmad Jalayir

== Legacy ==
Hasan Buzurg seemed intent on restoring unity to the Ilkhanate. This is evidenced by the fact that he used the title of ulus beg all of his life, and raised several men as Ilkhans instead of ruling in his own name. Furthermore, he attempted to unify Persia; he had sent a Muhammad-I Mulai to act as governor of Khurasan, for example; the latter was later executed by Togha Temür's military commander Arghun Shah. In attempting to maintain the Ilkhanate, he ultimately failed, and in some ways accelerated its disintegration, by preventing other forces such as the Chobanids from gaining more influence. However, he set up a strong state that would rule over Iraq and parts of Persia for over half a century, a state that would become even more powerful under his successor Shaikh Avais.

Hasan Buzurg is also remembered for his friendship with Safi-ad-din Ardabili (d. 1334) of the Ardabili tariqa. This evolved into the Safaviyya movement and Ardabili's descendants would found the Safavid dynasty. After Hasan Buzurg's death, the Jalayirids continued to maintain good relations with the Arbadili order. Later on, many of Hasan Buzurg's accomplishments would be accredited to his friendship with Safi al-Din.

== Sources ==
- Wing, Patrick (2016), The Jalayirids: Dynastic State Formation in the Mongol Middle East, Edinburgh University Press, ISBN 9781474402255, JSTOR 10.3366/j.ctt1bgzbrm
- Dalkesen, Nilgün (2007), Gender Roles and Women's Status in Central Asia and Anatolia Between the Thirteenth and Sixteenth Centuries (PDF)
- Melville, Charles (2009), "Anatolia under the Mongols", The Cambridge History of Turkey, Cambridge University Press (published 2010), pp. 51–101, doi:10.1017/CHOL9780521620932.004, ISBN 9781139055963
- Peter Jackson (1986). The Cambridge History of Iran, Volume Six: The Timurid and Safavid Periods. ISBN 0-521-20094-6

Preceded by –	Jalayirid Ruler; 1336–1356	Succeeded by Shaikh Uvais
