= Dimashqiyya =

Dimashqiyya Persian: دمشقیه, romanized: Dimashqiyya South Azerbaijani: گوموش‌قیه, romanized: Gümüşqaya
- Old Neighborhood
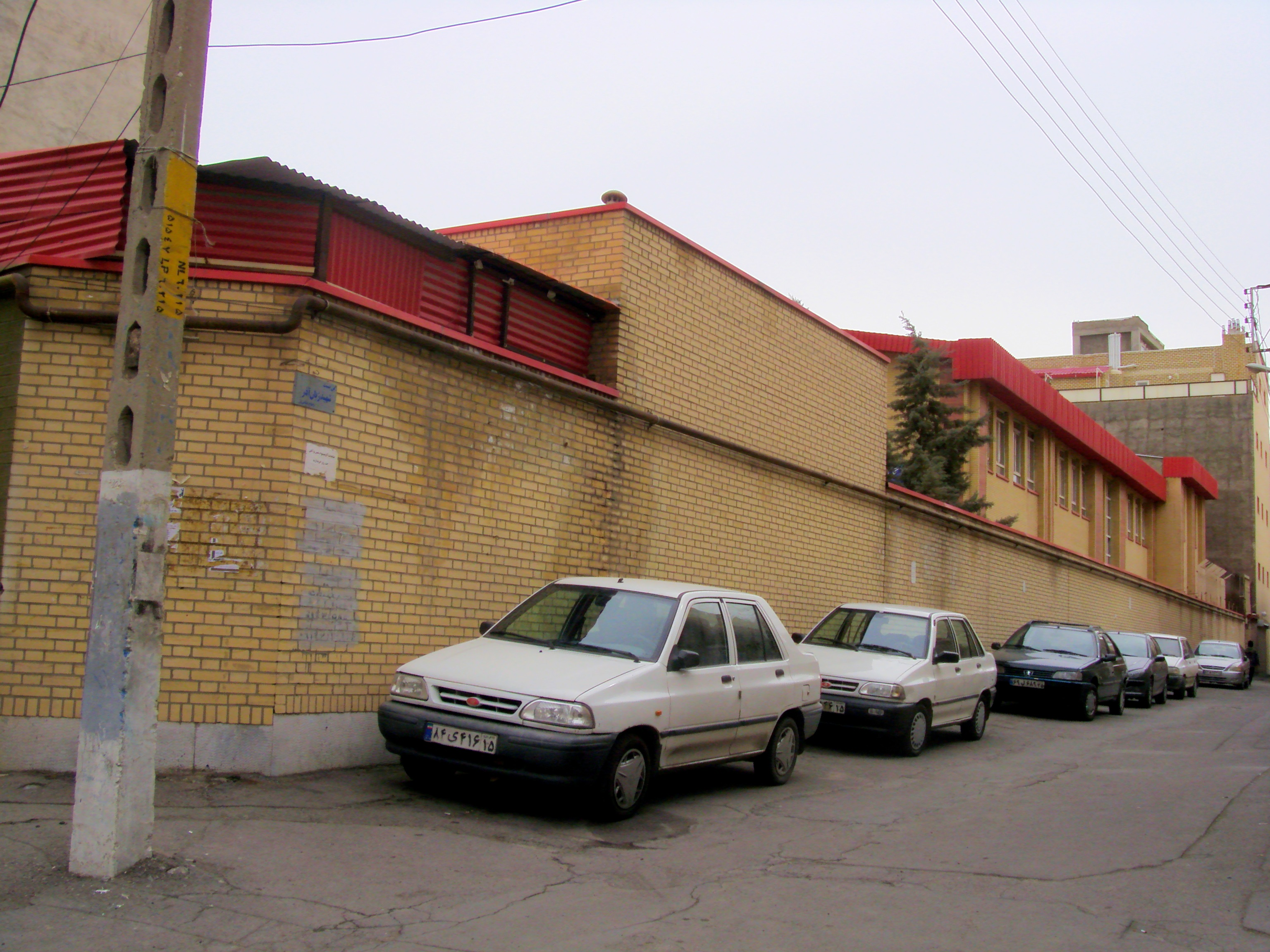
- Al-Zahra High School in Gumushqaya, where former cemetery of Dimashqiyya located

- Location within Iran
- Coordinates: 38°04′25.29″N 46°18′51.37″E
- City: Tabriz
- Country: Iran
- Established: 14th-century
- Founded by: Baghdad Khatun
- Named after: Demasq Kaja

Dimashqiyya or Damashqiyya (Persian: دمشقیه) is an old historical neighborhood of Tabriz. It is also referred to by local Azerbaijanis as Gumushqaya (South Azerbaijani: گوموش‌قیه, romanized: Gümüşqaya) who claim that the former is Persianized variant. It is currently a part of District 8 of Tabriz. It is bounded by Mehraneh river to the north and east. To its west is Beheshti street and to the south is Qarabaghi alley.

== History ==
It was formed around Dimashqiyya madrasah which was founded by Baghdad Khatun to honor her executed brother Demasq Kaja. Madrasah's calligraphy was made by ʿAbdallāh Ṣayrafī who also worked on Mosque of Master and Student. The madrasah was next to the cemetery where several Chobanid and Jalayirid rulers were buried:

1. Hasan Kuchak
2. Malek Ashraf
3. Demasq Kaja
4. Shaikh Hasan Jalayir
5. Shaikh Hussain Jalayir
6. Ahmad Jalayir (as well as his mother)
7. Tandu Khatun
8. Shah Walad Jalayir (d. 1411)
9. Ala ad-Dawla Jalayir

The cemetery was destroyed in 1970s under Pahlavi regime and Al-Zahra High School for Girls was built on its place in 1978.
