= Caia =

Caia may refer to:

== Places ==
- Caia, Mozambique, a town
- Caia District, an administrative district in Mozambique
- Caia (river), a river in Portugal

== Other uses ==
- Caia (plant), a genus of fossil plants
- Caia (music), a Japanese music group
- Caia van Maasakker (born 1989), Dutch field hockey player
- Capital Allowances for Intangible Assets, an Irish corporate tax avoidance BEPS tool
- Colorado AI Act, state law that regulates the usage of artificial intelligence
- Chartered Alternative Investment Analyst, an American financial services qualification

== See also ==
- Gaia (disambiguation)
- Kaia (disambiguation)
