= Kaja =

Kaja may refer to:

- Kaja (name), a given name, a nickname and a surname
- Kaja (singer), stage name of Vesna Milačić (born 1968), Montenegrin singer-songwriter
- Kaja (newspaper), a newspaper published in Estonia between 1919 and 1935
- Kajagoogoo, a British new wave band known as Kaja from 1984 to 1985
- Kaja Beedi, an India beedi brand

== KAJA ==
- KAJA (FM), a radio station (97.3 FM) licensed to San Antonio, Texas, United States
- KAJA, a subchannel of television station K22JA-D in Corpus Christi, Texas, United States

== See also ==
- Kaia (disambiguation)
- Kakinada Kaaja, an Indian sweet delicacy
- Khaja, a type of Indian pastry
- Kaya (disambiguation)
