= Kaia (name) =

Kaia is an Estonian and Norwegian name. It is also used as a variant for the name Kai, which means 'sea' in Hawaiian. Notable people with the name include:

== Surname ==
- Innocent Kaia (born 1992), Zimbabwean cricketer
- Mircan Kaia, Turkish musician and engineer
- Roy Kaia (born 1991), Zimbabwean cricketer
- Za Kaia (1926–1949), Burmese soldier

== Given name ==
- Kaia Arua (1990–2024), Papua New Guinean cricketer
- Kaia Gerber (born 2001), American model
- Kaia Iva (born 1964), Estonian politician
- Kaia Kanepi (born 1985), Estonian tennis player
- Kaia Kater (born 1993), Canadian musician
- Kaia Wøien Nicolaisen (born 1990), Norwegian biathlete
- Kaia Bruland Nilssen (1868–1950), Norwegian novelist
- Kaia Parnaby (born 1990), Australian softball player
- Kaia Storvik (born 1976), Norwegian journalist and politician
- Kaia Urb (born 1956), Estonian singer
- Kaia Wilson (born 1974), American punk rock singer and guitarist

== See also ==
- Kaia (disambiguation)
- Kaja (name)
