= Kaia =

Kaia or KAIA may refer to:

- Kaia (name), including a list of people with the name
- KaiA, a gene
- KAIA (group), a Filipino girl group
- KBAI (FM), radio station (91.5 FM) licensed to Blytheville, Arkansas, United States, formerly KAIA
- KAIA-FM, radio station (95.9 FM licensed to La Miranda, California) formerly KFSH-FM
- King Abdulaziz International Airport, Saudi Arabia's third largest airport
- The ICAO code for Alliance Municipal Airport in Nebraska, United States
- Kabul International Airport

== See also ==
- Caia (disambiguation)
- Kaja (disambiguation)
- Kaya (disambiguation)
