= Abu Sa'id Bahadur Khan =

Ruler of the Mongol Ilkhanate from 1316 to 1335

Abu Sa'id Bahadur Khan ابوسعید بهادرخان
- Bahadur Khan (Valiant King); Sultan Abu Sa'id
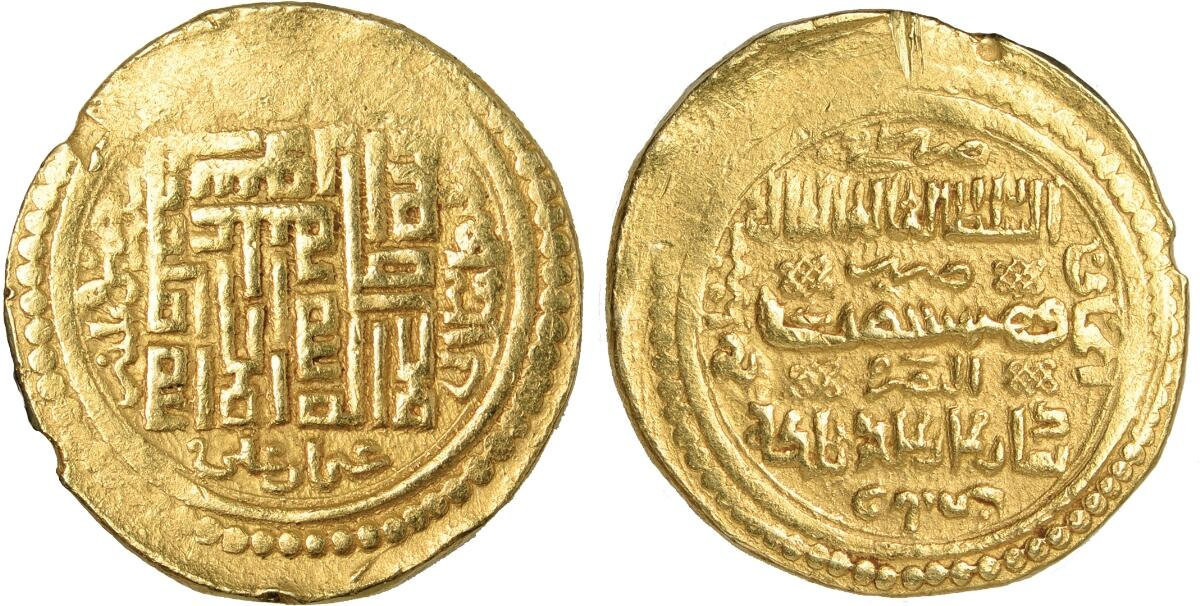
- Gold dinar of Abu Sa'id, gold dinar, al-Basra, 735h/Khani year 1334

9th Il-Khan
- Reign: 1316–1335
- Coronation: 1317
- Predecessor: Öljaitü
- Successor: Arpa Ke'un

Governor of Khorasan and Mazandaran
- Reign: 1315–1316
- Predecessor: Öljaitü
- Successor: Amir Yasaul
- Born: June 2, 1305; Ujan, Tabriz
- Died: December 1, 1335 (aged 30); Karabakh
- Consort: Uljay Qutlugh Khatun; Baghdad Khatun; Dilshad Khatun; Malika Khatun; Adil Shah Khatun; Sarqadaq Khatun
- Issue: Two unnamed daughters
Names
- Al-Sultan Al-Adil Abu Sa'id Bahadur Khan
- House: Borjigin
- Dynasty: Hulaguid
- Father: Öljaitü
- Religion: Sunni Islam

Abu Sa'id Bahadur Khan (June 2, 1305 – December 1, 1335; Persian: ابو سعید بهادر خان), also spelled Abusaid Bahador Khan, Abu Sa'id Behauder (Modern Mongolian: Абу-Саид Баатар хан, Abu sayid Baghatur Khan, [ˈabusæt ˈbaːtər xaːŋ] in modern Mongolian), was the ninth ruler (c. 1316 – 1335) of the Ilkhanate, a division of the Mongol Empire that encompassed the present day countries of Iran, Azerbaijan, Georgia, and Armenia, as well as parts of Iraq, Turkey, Afghanistan, and Pakistan. After his death in 1335, the Ilkhanate disintegrated.

== Early life ==
He was born on 2 June 1305, near Ujan, Tabriz to Öljaitü and Hajji Khatun of the Oirat. He became his father's heir after the deaths of his elder brothers. He was assigned to govern Khorasan and Mazandaran in 1315 with the Uyghur noble Amir Sevinch as his guardian.

== Reign ==
He was brought back to Soltaniyeh by Sevinch in December 1316; his coronation was delayed until spring or summer 1317 due to a conflict between the emir Chupan and Sevinch. Abu Said employed Rashid-al-Din Hamadani and Taj Al-Din Ali Shah Gilani as his viziers. However, the viziers were at odds and it led to Hamadani's dismissal in October 1317. Amir Sevinch died in January 1318, leaving young Abu Sa'id in the hands of Chupan. Although Chupan recalled Hamadani to serve in court, Gilani accused Hamadani (and his son Ibrahim Izzaddin, the cupbearer) of poisoning the late Ilkhan Öljaitü, which led to their eventual execution on 13 July 1318 near Abhar. This left Chupan as the de facto ruler of Ilkhanate. The following years were tumultuous for Abu Sa'id's reign.

=== Golden Horde invasion and rebellion of emirs ===
Battle scene from the Great Mongol Shahnama, created during the reign of Abu Sa'id (before 1335, Tabriz).

Golden Horde khan Özbeg invaded Azerbaijan in 1319 in coordination with Chagatayid prince Yasa'ur who had pledged loyalty to Öljaitü earlier but revolted in 1319. Prior to that, he had Amir Yasaul, governor of Mazandaran, killed by his subordinate Begtüt. Abu Sa'id was forced to send Amir Husayn Jalayir to face Yasa'ur while he himself marched against Özbeg. Özbeg was defeated shortly after thanks to reinforcements by Chupan, while Yasa'ur was killed by Kebek in 1320. Several umara ( plural of amir ) did not come to the aid of Abu Sa'id, therefore they were subject to punishment by Chupan. Yet another revolt started in 1319, this time by Keraite emirs Irinjin, a former governor of Diyarbakir, and Qurumishi, governor of Georgia; all were among the emirs who had been rebuked by Chupan. Irinjin was the father of Öljaitü's widow Qutluqshah Khatun and a son-in-law to Tekuder, while Qurumshi's father Alinaq Noyan was also a son-in-law of Tekuder. A 40,000-strong rebel army caught Chupan with his two sons and 2,000-strong entourage unguarded near Georgia and caused him to flee. Chupan arrived in Tabriz and reported to Abu Sa'id. Hearing this news, the Ilkhan moved against rebels and met them near Mianeh in modern East Azerbaijan.

The Ilkhanate victory at Mianeh on 20 June 1319 was a decisive one. Abu Sa'id was given the honorific titles of Baghatur (from Mongolian "баатар", meaning "hero, warrior") and al-Sultan al-Adil (the just Sultan). In total, 36 emirs and 7 khawateen (khatun)—including Amir Toqmaq, Qurumishi, Princess Könchek (daughter of Tekuder), her husband Irinjin and their sons Sheykh Ali and Vafadar—were executed, while Qurumushi's son Abdurrahman fled to Özbeg. Chupan was given Sati Beg, sister of Abu Sa'id, in marriage. His sons Timurtash, Shaikh Mahmud, Hasan and Demasq Kaja were given governorships of Anatolia, Georgia, Khorasan and Azerbaijan, respectively.

=== Chupanid rebellion ===
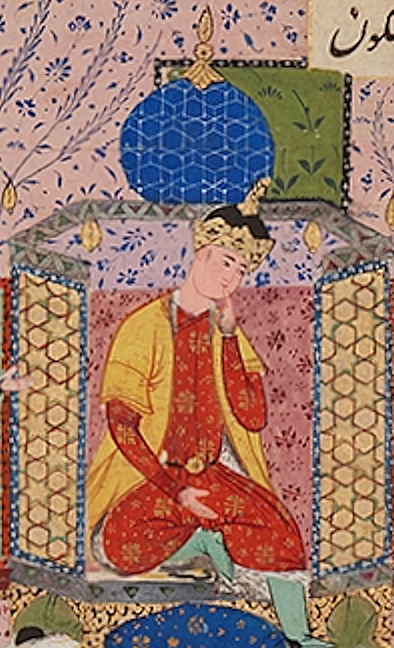
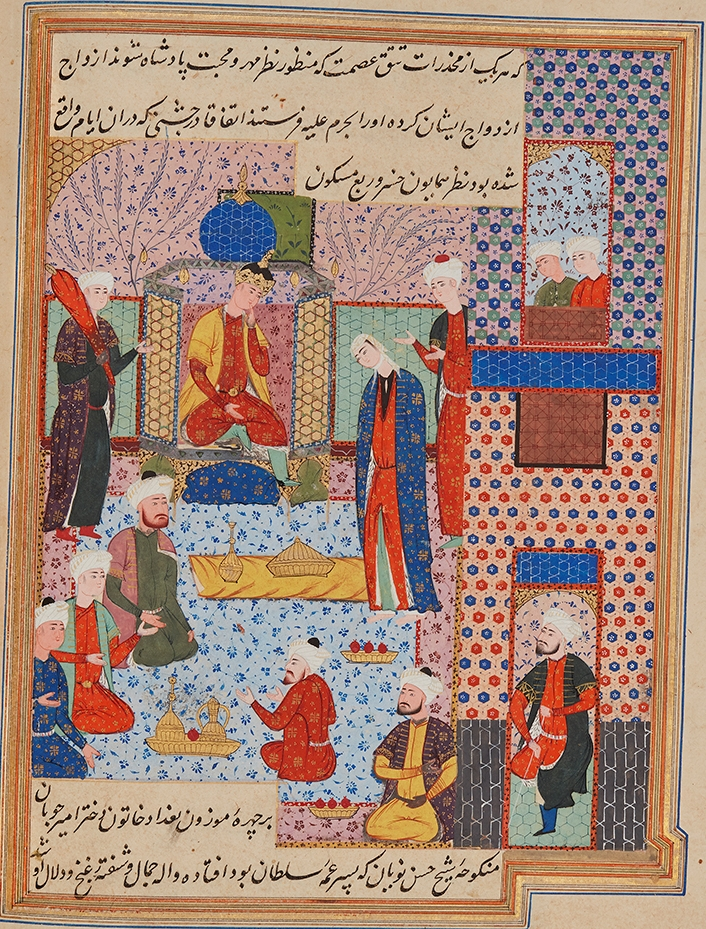
Abu Saʿid (detail), miniature "In the Court of Abu Saʿid". Folio from a Safavid manuscript of Nigaristan, Iran, probably Shiraz, dated 1573-74

Timurtash rose in rebellion in 1322, claiming to be the Mahdi. Chupan went to obtain his surrender personally and even managed to get his reappointment to the post by Abu Sa'id. Abu Sa'id sometime fell in love with Baghdad Khatun, one of Emir Chupan's daughters. The emir's efforts to keep Abu Sa'id from marrying his daughter, who was still married to Hasan Buzurg (another powerful kingmaker of the era), did not help the situation. Abu Said approached Chupan in 1325, claiming her unsuccessfully. Chupan sent his daughter and son-in-law to Karabakh instead while himself went against Özbeg and Tarmashirin who invaded Azerbaijan and Khorasan respectively. Using this opportunity, on 25 August 1327, Abu Sa'id had one of Chupan's sons, Demasq Kaja, killed, apparently for his activities with one of Öljaitü's former concubines. Hearing this, Chupan marched against Abu Sa'id seeking revenge. But many emirs including Muhammad Beg, uncle of Abu Sa'id deserted him near Ray, taking 30.000 soldiers with them, leaving Chupan no choice but to retreat to Herat. However he was soon strangled by Kartid ruler Ghiyath-ud-din under orders of Abu Sa'id in 1327. His daughter was soon forced to divorce Hasan Buzurg and marry Abu Sa'id. In compensation, Hasan was awarded Chupan's former post, rising to be a new commander-in-chief of the Ilkhanid army.

== Later years ==
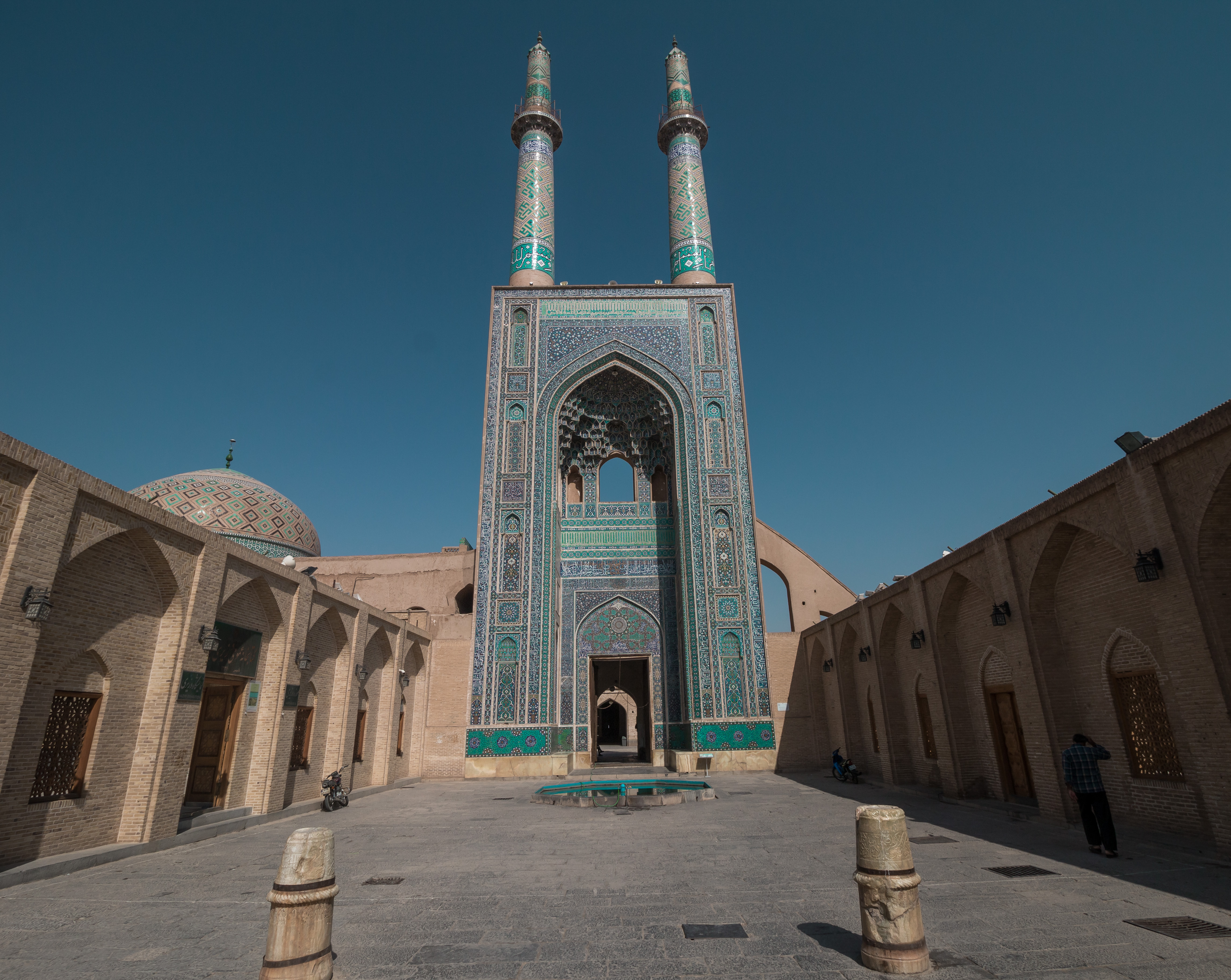
The Jameh Mosque of Yazd was created by the Il-khanids, during the reign of Abu Sa'id in 1324-1334.

Now ruling personally, Abu Sa'id invited Ghiyas al-Din, son of Rashid al-Din to be his vizier. Narin Taghai (a nephew of Taghachar and grandson of Kitbuqa) who was responsible for Chupan's downfall and Abu Sa'id's uncle Ali Padshah were granted governorates of Khorasan and Baghdad respectively. However Ghiyas al-Din's enforcement of central authority didn't coincide with other umara's plans. Narin Taghai left his post in 1329 to kill Ghiyas al-Din. He was aided by emirs Ali Padshah and Misr Khwaja. Narin Taghay was executed in September or 29 July 1329, ending another serious threat. Later Hasan Buzurg too was accused of treason with Baghdad Khatun in 1332 but reinstated as governor of Anatolia later. However, Abu Sa'id divorced Baghdad and married her niece Dilshad Khatun in 1333.

In 1334, Abu Sa'id appointed Amir Musaffar Inaq as governor of Shiraz to the resentment of Sharaf al-Din Mahmudshah Inju, founder of Injuid dynasty, who was ruling Fars region for a while since Chupan's death. He pursued Musaffar to Abu Sa'id's tent, accidentally making attempt on his life. Mahmudshah's rebellious act got him imprisoned.

== Foreign relations ==
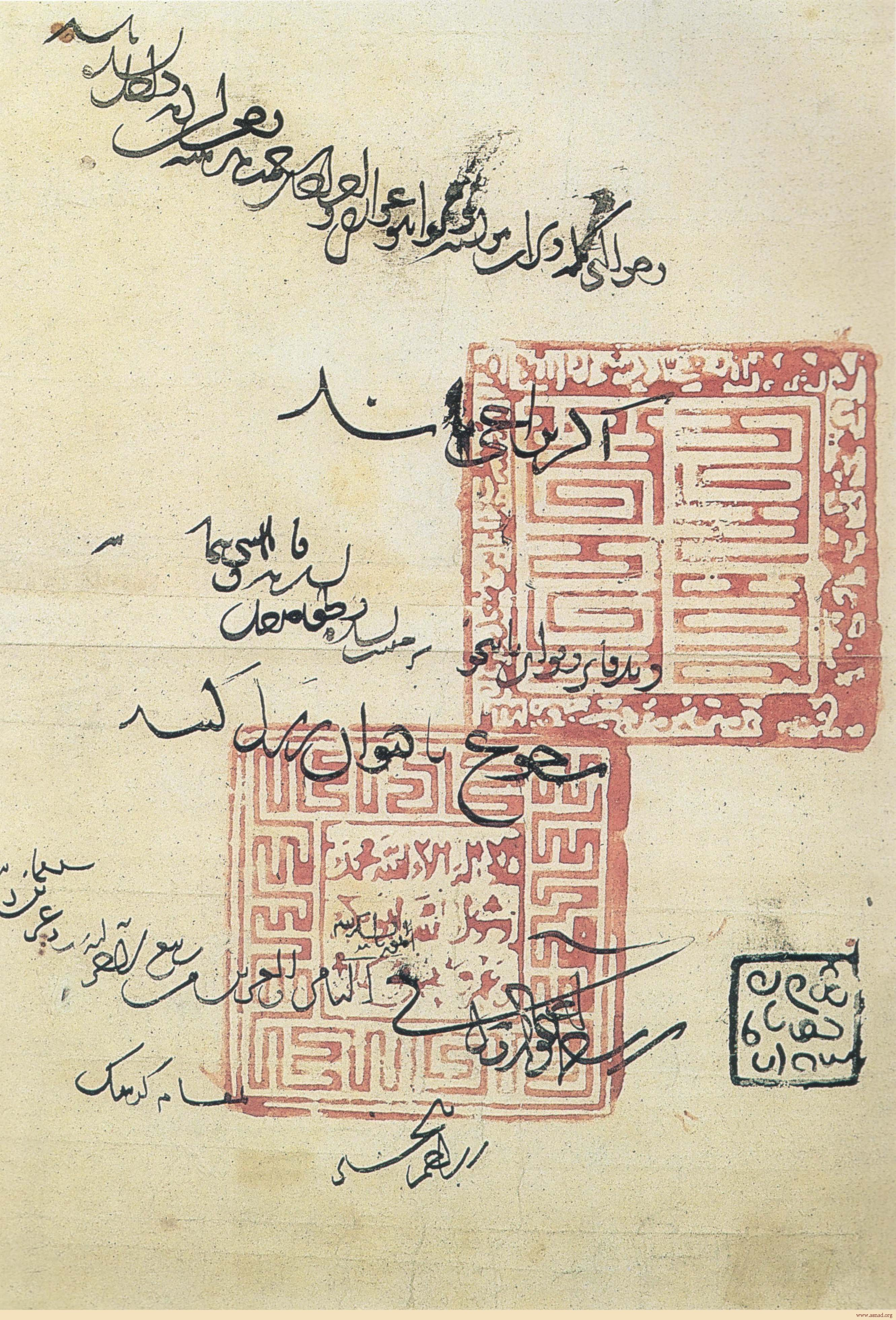
Abu Sa'id Bahadur Khan's Imperial edict (Firman) in Persian language with two bilingual East Asian-style seals in Chinese and Arabic.

An Ilkhanid paiza bearing the inscription “Abu Saʿid Bahadur Khan: Our Edict” in Mongolian (right), and a depiction of a payk with Mongolian inscriptions concerning the location of its mission (left).

Abu Sa'id signed a commercial treaty with Venice in 1320, while also granting them to establish oratories throughout the empire. He also improved relations with Mamluk Egypt the same year, signing a treaty. He is also known to have corresponded with Muhammad bin Tughluq of Delhi Sultanate.

== Death ==
Abu Sa'id had to face another invasion by Özbeg in 1335 and left to face him, but died on his way in Karabakh on the night of 30 November 1335. His body was taken to Soltaniyeh and buried there. According to Ibn Battuta (1304 – 1368), Abu Sa'id was poisoned by Baghdad Khatun on the grounds of jealousy. Modern historians suggest that he may have died of bubonic plague instead.

Abu Sa'id died without an heir or an appointed successor, thus leaving the Ilkhanate vulnerable. This led to clashes between the major families, such as the Chupanids, the Jalayirids, and new movements like the Sarbadars, Muzzafarids. Ibn Battuta wrote of his amazement that, upon his own return to Persia after a twenty-year absence, the realm which had seemed to be so mighty had dissolved so quickly. The Ilkhanate lost cohesion after the deaths of Abu Sa'id and his successor Arpa Ke'un, and became a collection of small kingdoms ruled by Mongols, Turks, Persians, and Arabs.

== Viziers ==
- Rashid-al-Din Hamadani (1317)
- Taj Al-Din Ali Shah (1317–1323)
- Rukn al-Din Sa'in (1323–1327)
- Ghiyas al-Din ibn Rashid al-Din (1327–1335)

== Family ==
Consorts

Abu Sa'id married six times from different clans including Borjigin, Oirat and Suldus:

- Uljay Qutlugh Khatun (m. 5 July 1317), daughter of Ghazan and Bulughan Khatun, and widow of his elder brother Bastam;
- Baghdad Khatun (m. 1327 – div. 1333, executed December 16, 1335), daughter of Amir Chupan, and former wife of Hasan Buzurg;
- Malika Khatun, daughter of Tuq b. Sulaimish b. Tengiz Güregen;
- Dilshad Khatun (m. 1333, died 27 December 1351), daughter of Demasq Kaja and Tursin Khatun, daughter of Irinjin Kurkan and Konchak Khatun, daughter of Tekuder;
- Adil Shah Khatun (died 7 May 1332, near Ujan), daughter of Tukal ibn Essen Qutlugh (Governor of Khorasan, d. 10 October 1318);
- Sarqadaq Khatun, daughter of Dawlat Shah Suldus, relative of Amir Chupan;

Children

Abu Sa'id had two daughters

- A daughter – with Uljay Qutlugh Khatun;
- A daughter (born 18 May 1336) – with Dilshad Khatun;

== Personality ==
According to Ibn Battuta, Abu Sa'id was one of "the most beautiful of God's creatures". He was the only Il-Khan to compose poetry as well as music.

== Ancestry ==
Ancestors of Abu Sa'id Bahadur Khan

16. Hulagu Khan
8. Abaqa Khan
17. Yesuchin Khatun
4. Arghun
9. Qaitmish Khatun
2. Öljaitü
20. Uyku or Abaqu
10. Saruji
5. Uruk Khatun
1. Abu Sa'id Bahadur Khan
24. Tengiz Güregen
12. Sulaimish
25. Daughter of Güyük Khan
6. Chichak
3. Hajji Khatun
14. Hulagu Khan
7. Tödogach Khatun

== Sources ==
- Atwood, Christopher P. (2004). The Encyclopedia of Mongolia and the Mongol Empire. Facts on File, Inc. ISBN 0-8160-4671-9.

Regnal titles
Preceded by Öljeitü	Ilkhanid Dynasty; 1316–1335	Succeeded by Arpa Ke'un
