= Baghdad Khatun =

Empress consort of the Ilkhanate
- Tenure: c. 1327 – c. 1333
- Died: 16 December 1335; Ilkhanate
- Spouse: Hasan Buzurg; Abu Sa'id Bahadur Khan
- House: Chupanid (by birth); Jalayirid (by marriage); Borjigin (by marriage)
- Father: Chupan
- Religion: Islam

Baghdad Khatun (Persian: بغداد خاتون; died 16 December 1335) (lit. Queen Baghdad), was a Chobanid princess, the daughter of Chupan. She was the empress consort of the Ilkhanate as the wife of Abu Sa'id Bahadur Khan.

== Family ==
Baghdad Khatun was the daughter of Emir Chupan, who was the leading Mongol amir of the Ilkhanid period. She had four full brothers Hasan, Demasq Kaja, Timurtash and Shaikh Mahmoud.

== Marriages ==
=== Hasan Buzurg ===
In 1323, Baghdad Khatun married Amir Shaikh Hasan Buzurg, the son of Amir Husayn Kurkan, the son of Amir Aq Buqa Jalayir. In 1325 Abu Sa'id, aged twenty, fell in love with Baghdad and wanted to marry her, although she was married to Shaikh Hasan. He requested her hand from her father Chupan through intermediaries. At that time it was understood that according to the Genggisid law any woman sought by the Khan was to be given a divorce by her husband and sent to the emperor's harem.

On the other hand, Chupan did not obey Abu Sa'id's order in the case of his own daughter. In fact, Chupan did not refuse his order openly, but he put him off. He sent his daughter and son-in-law to Qarabagh and Abu Sa'id to Baghdad for the winter. But after the winter, Chupan did not give any answer to Abu Sa'id and in order to relive the situation, he realized that the best course of action was for him to absent himself from the emperor's court for a few days. When he went, he took along the vizier Giyath al-Mulk and other emirs, which provoked the Sultan against him.

When Chupan left for Khurasan, the rival emirs instigated Abu Sa'id against Chupan's son Dimasq Kaja, and had him executed in 1327. After the execution of his son, Chupan spoke reproachfully about Abu Sa'id, and in a combat with his soldiers he was killed.

=== Abu Sa'id ===
After Chupan, there was no hindrance for Abu Sa‘id to marry Baghdad. This time, he sent Qazi to ask for Baghdad from her husband Hasan. Baghdad got divorced and married Abu Sa'id. After her marriage, Baghdad began to take an active part in all administrative and fiscal affairs. Abu Sa'id gave her very rich yarlighs, which means that, besides her political power, she had also very rich economic resources. She became very effective in political matters with vizier Giyath al-Din Mahmud Rashidi. By using this opportunity, she executed the enemies of her father and her brothers and avenged them. Abu Sa'id's mother, Hajji Khatun regarded Baghdad as a rival to her influence over Abu Sa'id.

She received the title Khodawandigar (Great lord). Using her power, Baghdad Khatun prevented the marriage of Chupan's widow Korducin Khatun to Malik Ghiyath ud-Din of Herat, who had murdered her father in 1327. She had also managed to gain respectful treatment of her stepmother Sati Beg Khatun and Sati's son Surgan.

In 1331–32, it was said that Baghdad Khatun and her former husband Shaikh Hasan met secretly and even made a plan to kill Abu Sa'id. One year later, it was understood that this was only gossip, but this event curbed their power, and he was appointed as governor of Anatolia. During this time, Abu Sa'id fell in love with Dilshad Khatun, Baghdad's niece, the daughter of Dimasq Kaja and granddaughter of Chupan. He divorced Baghdad and married her in 1333. Baghdad lost her power and authority to a great extent. At the end of his life, he was not happy with his wives but loved Dilshad very much. This made Baghdad very jealous.

== Death ==
After Abu Sa'id's death in 1335, Arpa Ke'un was crowned on the Ilkhanid realm but Baghdad did not obey him and he executed her on the pretext of her secret alliance with the enemy Öz Beg Khan and poisoning of Abu Sa'id. She was beaten to death by Khwaja Lulu, a Greek slave, in the bath on 16 December 1335.

== Sources ==
- Dalkesen, Nilgün (2007). Genger Roles and Women's Status in Central Asia and Anatolia Between the Thirteenth and Sixteenth Centuries (Thesis).
