= Chupan =

Nominal general of the Mongol Empire (died 1327)

Amir Chūpān

Supreme commander of Il-Khanate
- In office 1307–1327
- Appointed by: Abu Sa'id Bahadur Khan
- Preceded by: Kutlushah
- Succeeded by: Hasan Buzurg

Personal details
- Born: c. 1262
- Died: October 1327 (aged 64–65) Herat, Kartid Emirate
- Resting place: Al-Baqi'
- Spouse(s): Sati Beg; Kurdujin Khatun; Dowlandi Khatun
- Children: Hassan (Chupanids); Timurtash; Demasq Kaja; Shaikh Mahmoud; Baghdad Khatun; Yagi Basti

Military service
- Battles/wars: Battle of Marj al-Saffar (1303)

Amir Chūpān (Persian: امیر چوپان; died October/November 1327), also spelt Choban or Coban, was a Chupanid noble of the Ilkhanate, and nominal general of the Mongol Empire. He was ennobled by Emperor Taiding of Yuan as Duke of Yi (翊國公).

== Background ==
Chupan's father Malek participated in the Siege of Baghdad in 1258 while his uncle Akrunchi participated in a campaign in Georgia in 1318. His grandfather was Tudaun from the Suldus clan and was directly descended from Sorqan Shira's son Chilaun, who was one of Genghis Khan's four great companions. Tudaun was one of Sunjaq(or Sughunjaq)'s many younger brothers who accompanied Hulagu on his campaigns in West Asia. Sunjaq was one of the generals in overall charge of Hulagu's expeditionary force, and he also served as the Yarguci, who oversrow charge of judicial affairs for the entire forces, as well as commander of the Right wing forces and the Kesikten, Hulagu's royal guard. During the reigns of Hulagu and Arghun, he held one of the highest positions in the Ilkhanate, alongside Ilga Noyan of the Jalayir tribe and his son Shiktur Noyan. Tudaun accompanied Hulagu on his campaign against Golden Horde in 1262 and named as governor of Diyar Bakr, died in 1277 at the Battle of Elbistan.

== Early career ==
He participated in a battle against Nogai of Golden Horde in 1289 during his 20s. Amir Chupan was mentioned as a supporter of Gaykhatu during the latter's successful campaign for the Ilkhanid throne. During Ghazan's fight with Baydu for the throne in 1295, Chupan met with him near the Ustunavand castle and changed sides. He participated in a campaign against Sulaimish of Oirats, who rebelled in Anatolia in 1299. He acted as a senior commander during Ghazan's three campaigns against Syria, then under the rule of the Mamelukes. However, later, Chupan's army under the command of Ghazan's chief military officer Qutlugh Shah, was defeated by the Mamelukes in the battle of Marj al-Saffar (1303). When Qutlugh Shah fled, Chupan stayed with the army, and reached Ghazan in June. Ghazan, furious at the defeat, punished both Qutlugh Shah and Chupan, though the latter was dealt with more leniently. He also met Zahid Gilani sometime during reign of Ghazan.

=== Under Öljeitü ===
On 19 March 1305 Chupan was betrothed to the daughter of Ghazan's successor Öljeitü, Dowlandi Khatun. In 1307 he was given command of one of four armies assigned to quell the rebellious province of Gilan. Marching from Ardabil, he convinced the rulers of Astara and Gaskareh to surrender peacefully and then met up with Öljeitü. Qutlugh Shah's army, however, did not fare so well, and he was killed by the Gilaks. Following his death, Öljeitü made Chupan his chief military commander(amīr al-umarā') or Amir of the Ulus (nation). This was followed by his marriage to his fiancée Dowlandi on 30 September 1307. Chupan was now a major influence behind the throne, though he had to contend with the court viziers. Dowlandi died in 1314; following the death of Öljeitü in 1316, his son Abu Sa'id confirmed Chupan's status as Amir of the Ulus, despite attempts by the Amir Sevinch to gain the position for himself. Moreover, Chupan was betrothed to Sati Beg, another daughter of Öljeitü in 1317.

== Rise and fall under Abu Sa'id ==
Chupan attempted to neutralize the influence of the viziers. In 1318, he convinced the discredited former vizier Rashid-al-Din Hamadani to return to the Ilkhanid court. Rashid, who had many enemies, was accused of poisoning Öljeitü soon after he returned. Chupan promptly turned on him, and Rashid-al-Din was put to death in July of that year.

In 1319, armies under the command of the khan of the Blue Horde, Öz-Beg, invaded the Ilkhanate. Abu Sa'id led a campaign to stop the invasion. Chupan was on his way to assist Amir Husain (the father of the founder of the Jalayirids, Hasan Buzurg) against the raids of the Chagatai prince Yasa'ur, who was devastating Khurasan, but then turned around to support Abu Sa'id upon receiving word that the latter's position across the Kur River was in danger. Several of Abu Sa'id's officers had deserted, leaving his army weakened. He rushed to his master's position, only to find the troops of the Blue Horde already in flight. Nevertheless, Chupan inflicted heavy casualties upon the enemy.

The matter of Abu Sa'id's officers fleeing still needed to be addressed. When the amir enacted punishment against Qurumushi (also a potential rival), as well as several other officers, for their military negligence, a conspiracy was then launched against him. The conspirators included Abu Sa'id's uncle Irinjin, who Chupan had dismissed from the governorship of Diyarbakr. Irinjin was defeated near Mianeh in June 1319. Following these events, Chupan gained almost complete influence over the Ilkhan, and his sons gained prominent positions as the Ilkhanate was parceled out among them. His sons Timurtash, Shaikh Mahmud, Hasan and Demasq Kaja were given governorships of Anatolia, Georgia, Khorasan and Azerbaijan respectively. He also married Abu Sa'id's sister Sati Beg, whom he had been betrothed to since 1316.

However, his son Timurtash rose in rebellion in 1322, claiming to be Mahdi. Chupan went to obtain his surrender personally and even managed to get reappointment to the post by Abu Sa'id. Abu Sa'id sometime fell in love with Baghdad Khatun, one of emir Chupan's daughters. The emir's efforts to keep Abu Sa'id from marrying his daughter, who was still married to Hasan Buzurg (another powerful kingmaker of the era), did not help the situation. Abu Said approached Chupan in 1325, claiming her unsuccessfully. Chupan sent his daughter and son-in-law to Karabakh instead while himself went against Özbeg and Tarmashirin who invaded Azerbaijan and Khorasan respectively. Same year Chupan defeated another force led by Özbeg, and even invaded the Blue Horde.

As Chupan had reached the height of his power, he had also sown the seeds of his fall. While Abu Sa'id lacked a treasury, Chupan's son and administrative representative Demasq Kaja spent his wealth extravagantly. This situation annoyed the Ilkhan, who was further influenced against him by his viziers, particularly Rukn al-Din Sa'in, Chupan's own protégé. Chupan's efforts to keep Abu Sa'id from marrying his daughter Bagdad Katun, who was already married to Hasan Buzurg, did not help the situation.

Early in 1326, Chupan led an army to defend against an imminent invasion of Khurasan. By the request of Abu Said, the Khagan Yesün Temür awarded his custodian Chupan the nominal title of a chief-commander of all Mongol Khanates. In the autumn of that year, the Chagatai Khan Tarmashirin crossed the Oxus River, and was defeated by Chupan's son Hasan near Ghazna. The vizier Rukn al-Din Sa'in had traveled with Chupan, leaving Demasq Kaja in effective control at the Ilkhanid court. It was at this time that Abu Sa'id decided to make his move. Using opportunity, on 25 August 1327, Abu Sa'id had one of Chupan's sons, Demasq Kaja, killed, apparently for his activities with a former concubine of Öljaitü's.

Hearing this, Chupan marched against Abu Sa'id seeking revenge. he convinced the local religious leader of Simnan, Shaikh 'Ala' al-Daula, to try to negotiate a truce, and then camped near Qazvin. When the shaikh failed, he continued west, with his troops pillaging on the way. Upon reaching Quha, he was a day's journey away from Abu Sa'id's camp, but as night fell, most of his army including Muhammad Beg, uncle of Abu Sa'id deserted him near Ray, taking 30.000 soldier with them, leaving Chupan no choice but to retreat to Herat. Upon reaching Saveh, he sent his wife Sati Beg back to Abu Sa'id. He then traveled in the direction of Tabas, with the intention of finding refuge in Transoxiana. Upon reaching the Murghab River, he changed his mind and headed for Khurasan. He was given a friendly welcome into Herat by the local Kartid ruler, Ghiyath ud-Din. However, he was soon strangled to death under orders of Abu Sa'id in 1327. Chupan and his son Chilaun were both killed. As Chupan's friend, Ghiyath ordered that he be killed by strangulation, which was considered an honorable way to die. The Kartid leader then sent one of Chupan's fingers to Abu Sa'id as proof of the deed. Many of Chupan's sons were to also die in the next few years. His daughter soon forced to divorce Hasan Buzurg and marry Abu Sa'id. In compensation, Hasan was awarded former post of Chupan, rising to be new commander-in-chief of Ilkhanid army.

He was buried in Medina, in the cemetery of Baqi, under the supervision of his daughter Bagdad Katun.

== Personality ==
Chupan was described as a devout Muslim who was also against among emirs who opposed Öljeitü's conversion to Shiism. Described by various sources as brave and just.

In November 1325, Chupan personally went on the Hajj pilgrimage, during his stay repairing the water system of Mecca, as well as founding a bath and Madrasa in Medina.

Being a fervent Muslim, he also oversaw reconstruction of mosques in Tabriz as well as demolition of churches. Nevertheless, he also protected Mar Yahballaha III.

Upon his death, his body was transported along with the Iraqi pilgrimage caravan, and buried in Medina.

== Children ==
He had at least 4 wives, by whom Chupanid dynasty descended. Most of his children were born by unknown spouses. He also named at least two of his sons after his ancestors Chilaun and Sorgan Shira:

- With unknown wives:
  1. Hasan — Viceroy of Khorasan and Mazandaran
    - Talish
    - Haji Beg
    - Quc Husayn
  2. Timurtash — Viceroy of Anatolia
    - Hasan Kuchak
    - Malek Ashraf
      - Timurtash
      - Sultanbakht
    - Malek Ashtar
    - Misr Malek
  3. Demasq Kaja — Representative of Chupan in court of Abu Sa'id, married to Tursan (or Tursin), daughter of Irinjin of Keraites
    - Dilshad Khatun
    - 3 daughters
  4. Shaikh Mahmud — Governor of Armenia and Georgia
    - Pir Husayn
    - 3 sons
  5. Bagdad Katun — Khatun of Abu Sa'id
- Dowlandi Katun (betrothal - 19 March 1305, married - 30 September 1307, died - 1314) — daughter of Öljeitü
  1. Chilaun
- Kurdujin Khatun — governess of Shiraz and Kirman, daughter of Mengü Timur and Abish Khatun:
  1. Siuksah
  2. Yagi Basti
  3. Nowruz
- Sati Beg (fl. 1316–1345) — daughter of Öljeitü, later Il-Khan:
  1. Surgan

== See also ==
- List of burials at Jannat al-Baqī

== Sources ==
- Charles Peter Melville (1999). Fall of Amir Chupan and the Decline of the Ilkhanate 1327-37. Research Institute for Inner Asian Studies.
- Charles Melville and 'Abbas Zaryab. http://www.iranica.com/articles/search/searchpdf.isc?ReqStrPDFPath=/home1/iranica/articles/v5_articles/chobanids&OptStrLogFile=/home/iranica/public_html/logs/pdfdownload.html. Encyclopædia Iranica.
- J. A. Boyle (1968). The Cambridge History of Iran, Volume Five: The Saljuq and Mongol Periods. ISBN 0-521-06936-X

== Bibliography ==
- Rashid al-Din Hamadani, Jami' al-tawarikh
  - Thackston, W.M.,(tr.) Rashiduddin Fazlullah’s Jamiʻuʾt-tawarikh (Compendium of Chronicles), Harvard University, Department of Near Eastern Languages and Civilizations, 1998–99
  - Rowshan, M. & Mūsavī M.,(ed.), Jāmiʿ al-Tavārīkh 4vols, Tehran, 1375/1994 or 1995.
- Abu al-Qasim Kashani, Tārīkh-i Ūlǰāytū, (ed.) M. Hamblī, Tehran, 1348/1969.
- Hafiz-i Abru, Dhayl Jāmiʿ al-Tawārīkh-i Rashīdī, (ed.)Khān Bābā Bayānī, Tehran, 1971.
- Anonym, Muʿizz al-Ansāb fi Shajarat al-Ansāb, BnF.Département des Manuscrits. Persan 67.
- Abd al-Razzaq Samarqandi, Maṭlaʿ Saʿdayn wa Majmaʿ-i Baḥrayn, (ed.)ʿAbd al-Ḥusayn Navāʾī, Tehran Tehran, 1353 Š./1974.
