= Uljay Qutlugh Khatun =

- Empress consort of the Ilkhanate
- Born: 14 March 1297; Shehraban, Ilkhanate
- Died: Unknown
- Spouse: Bistam; Abu Sa'id Bahadur Khan
- Issue: Unnamed daughter
- House: Borjigin
- Dynasty: Hulaguid
- Father: Ghazan
- Mother: Bulughan Khatun
- Religion: Islam

Uljay Qutlugh Khatun (Persian: الجای قتلق خاتون; born 14 March 1297) (lit. "Queen Uljay Qutlugh), also Öljei Qutlugh, Oljai Kutlugh or Uljaki, was a Mongol princess, and empress consort of the Ilkhanate as the principal wife of Abu Sa'id Bahadur Khan.

== Early life ==
Uljay Qutlugh Khatun was born on 14 March 1297 at Shehraban. She was the only daughter of Ghazan Khan. Her mother was Bulughan Khatun, the daughter of Otman, and granddaughter of Obetay Nuyun of the Qonqirut tribe. Bulughan married Ghazan in October 1295, after both of them converted to Islam. Uljay had a younger full brother named Alju, who died in infancy.

== Marriages ==
=== Bistam ===
On 17 September 1303, Ghazan betrothed Uljay to Bistam, the eldest son of Ghazan's younger brother Öljaitü Khan. The marriage took place on 12 January 1305, when Uljay was seven. By marrying Ghazan's only surviving child to his eldest son, Öljaitu wished to consolidate his position as well as that of his successor, as heir to Ghazan's legacy.

=== Abu Sa'id ===
After Bistam's premature death, Uljay was betrothed to his younger brother Abu Saʿid, at the time of the prince's departure to Khurasan. The marriage took place before his accession to the throne on 5 July 1317, and Uljay became his chief and most beloved wife. She had a daughter with Abu Sa'id.

Shushtar was allocated to the wages (mavajib) of Uljay Qutlugh.

== Ancestry ==
Ancestors of Uljay Qutlugh Khatun

16. Hulagu Khan
8. Abaqa Khan
17. Yesuchin Khatun
4. Arghun
9. Qaitmish Khatun
2. Ghazan
5. Nukdan Khatun
1. Uljay Qutlugh Kharun
12. Obetay Nuyun
6. Otman
3. Bulughan Khatun

== Sources ==
- Raby, Julian; Fitzherbert, Teresa (1996). The Court of the Il-Khans, 1290-1340. University of Oxford.
- Lambton, Ann K. S. (January 1, 1988). Continuity and Change in Medieval Persia. SUNY Press. ISBN 978-0-887-06133-2.
