= Timurtash =

Mongol viceroy of Anatolia

Viceroy of Anatolia
- In office 31 July 1314 – 22 December 1327
- Monarch: Abu Sa'id Bahadur Khan
- Deputy: Sinaneddin Ariz
- Vizier: Jalal al-Din b. Rashid al-Din Hamadani
- Preceded by: Irinjin
- Succeeded by: Amir Muhammad of Oirats

Personal details
- Born: c. 1298
- Died: August 12, 1328 (aged 29–30) Qarafa, Cairo, Mamluk Egypt
- Parent: Chupan

Ala ud-Din Timurtash (died 1328; also Temürtaš or Timür-Tash, Turkish: Alaeddin Demirtaş) was a member of the Chobanids who dominated politics in the final years of the Ilkhanate.

== Early life ==
He was born to Mongol emir and general Chupan as his second son c. 1298. Timurtash was mentioned for the first time in a hunting party organized by Öljaitü in 1313 where almost all Chupanids participated. He lived with his father until 1314 in Sultaniyeh.

== Viceroyalty ==
He was appointed to Mongol viceroyalty of Anatolia by Chupan after Keraite emir Irinjin was recalled to Diyar Bakir in 1314. His deputy was Sinaneddin Ariz (or Seyfeddin Razi), while his vizier tasked with collection of the provincial revenues was Jalal al-Din, son of Rashid al-Din Hamadani. However, when Irinjin rebelled in 1319, his lands were pillaged by Keraites, Timurtash himself fleeing to Danishmendid territory. He was reconfirmed as viceroy after the victory of Chupan. However, this revolt made Timurtash unsure of his position and forced him to ally with Mamluks, even to the point of sending a letter to the Sultan to accept him as a governor.

His tenure was marked by the suppression of vassals of Ilkhanate, namely the Armenian Kingdom of Cilicia and the Anatolian beyliks. He succeeded in capturing Konya in 1320 from Karamanids and marched on Leo IV in alliance with al-Nasir Muhammad in 1321 and captured Ayas on 10 May according to Abulfeda. He also sacked Christian centers of Kayseri and Erzurum, forcing inhabitants to convert to Islam.

Timurtash implemented policies inspired by the writings of Sufi scholar Ibn Arabi, making it mandatory for non-Muslims to wear conical hats with yellow turbans as to distinguish them from Muslims, for "it would exalt Islam and abase the infidel".

=== Revolt ===
Growing rebellious every year, he declared open revolt against Abu Sa'id in December 1322 - January 1323, calling himself 'Sahib-az Zaman' (Arabic: صَاحِب ٱلزَّمَان, lit. 'Master of the Era') and 'Şah-i İslam' (Emperor of Islam) minting coins with his new title Mahdi. He banned alcoholic drinks and reforged an alliance with the Bahri Mamluks, forcing Chupan to march against his son in 1324. Chupan convinced his son to surrender and executed chief qadi of Anatolia Najm al-Din Tashti and emir Surkaji as rebellion instigators. He then secured a pardon for Timurtash and even had him reinstated as viceroy of Rum.

=== Second tenure ===
As soon as his reappointment, he marched on the Anatolian beyliks, captured Beyşehir, capital of the Eshrefids, executing their bey Süleyman II by drowning him in Lake Beyşehir on 9 October 1326, annexing it to the viceroyalty. Later he marched on Dündar of Hamidoğlu who fled to Alanya, but Timurtash caught up and executed him as well. He attacked Turgutids, Germiyanids and Beylik of Tadjeddin as well. He sent his subordinate Eretna against Nasir-ud Din Ahmed of Sahib Ataids in August 1327, capturing Karahisar, while bey fled to Yakup I of Germiyan. According to Faruk Sümer, he executed at least nine Seljukid princes, possibly trying to create his own sultanate.

== Downfall ==
Upon learning of his brother Demasq Kaja's execution on 24 August, Timurtash ended his campaigns and returned to Kayseri, then Sivas, recalling Eretna as well. Receiving news of Chupan's execution in October, he contemplated to submit to the Ilkhan, but nevertheless left for Larende on 22 December 1327 and then to Egypt, leaving Eretna as acting viceroy. He was replaced by Amir Muhammad from Oirat tribe, an uncle of Abu Sa'id.

Arriving in Besni, he was accompanied by about 1000 soldiers, 300 of them being cavalry. He was received by Tankiz, Mamluk viceroy in Damascus and then went to Egypt. He was received by Sultan Al-Nasr Muhammad on 21 January 1328 in Cairo and welcomed warmly at first, even offered the governorship of Alexandria. He was joined by Shahinshah his cousin in February. Just days after his arrival, envoys of Abu Sa'id arrived in the capital, demanding his extradition, which was denied by the Sultan. Sultan also received letters from Ibrahim I of Karaman and Najm al-Din Ishaq (son of Dündar), who accused Timurtash's misdeeds against fellow Muslims. Timurtash's growing influence and arrogance also quickly wore out his welcome. He was arrested on 19 June 1328 and secured in Lion Tower. Following month, second convoy of Ilkhanate envoys arrived, offering Mamluk renegade in Ilkhanate, Qara Sonqur (husband of Oljath) in exchange. The Sultan accepted and Timurtash was executed on 12 August 1328, his head was sent to Abu Sa'id, while his body was buried in City of the Dead, next to Faris ad-Din Aktai.

== Family ==
Three wives of Timurtash were established:

1. A sister of Eretna
2. Daulat Khatun, a sister of Ahi Osman; later married to Qara Jari by Hasan Kucek in 1336
  - Hasan Kucek
  - Malek Ashraf
  - Malek Ashtar (d. 1347)
  - Malek Misr
3. Kalturmish Khatun

However, Al-Safadi adds 4 more sons to his progeny: Jamdegan, Pir Hasan, Shabdun, Tudan.

== In Popular Media ==
- He was portrayed by Ahmet Sarıcan in the movie Killing the Shadows (2006)
- Portrayed by Mehmet Ali Nuroğlu in the series Kuruluş: Orhan

Timurtash Born: 1298 Died: 12 August 1328
Preceded by Chupan	Head of Chobanids; 1322 - 1327	Succeeded by Hassan Kuchak
