= Dilshad Khatun =

Chobanid princess (died 1351)

Empress consort of the Ilkhanate
- Tenure: c. 1333 – 30 November 1335
- Predecessor: Baghdad Khatun
- Successor: Sati Beg

Queen consort of the Jalayirids
- Tenure: c. 1336 – 27 December 1351
- Successor: Haji Mama Khatun
- Died: 27 December 1351; Baghdad, Jalayirid Sultanate
- Burial: Najaf, Jalayirid Sultanate
- Spouse: Abu Sa'id Bahadur Khan; Hasan Buzurg
- Issue: Shaykh Uways Jalayir
- House: Chupanid (by birth); Borjigin (by marriage); Jalayirid (by marriage)
- Father: Demasq Kaja
- Mother: Tursin Khatun
- Religion: Islam

Dilshad Khatun (Persian: دلشاد خاتون; died 27 December 1351), also Delshad, was a Chobanid princess. She was the wife of Ilkhan Abu Sa'id Bahadur Khan, and after him Hasan Buzurg, the first ruler of the Jalayirid Sultanate, and the mother of his son and successor Shaikh Awais.

== Family ==
Dilshad Khatun was the daughter of Demasq Kaja, and the granddaughter of Amir Chupan, who was the leading Mongol amir of the Ilkhanid period. Her mother was Tursin Khatun, daughter of Irinjin Kurkan, and Konchak Khatun, daughter of Ahmed Tekuder Khan, and Armini Khatun. She had three sisters, Sultan Bakht Khatun, Dendi Shah Khatun and Alam Shah Khatun. Her aunt was Baghdad Khatun, who was the wife firstly of Hasan Buzurg and after him of Abu Sa'id.

== Marriage to Abu Sa'id ==
After her father's death in 1327, Dilshad Khatun was brought under the protection of her aunt Baghdad, who had become wife of Abu Sa'id after having first been married to Hasan Buzurg. When Dilshad attained maturity Abu Sa'id fell in love with her. He divorced her aunt Baghdad Khatun, and married her in 1333. At the end of life, he was not happy with his wives, but loved Dilshad very much. Therefore, Baghdad became very jealous.

== Widowhood ==
After the Abu Sa'id's death in 1335, Arpa Ke'un, was chosen as his successor by the vizier, Ghiyas-al-Din Muhammad. Dilshad, who was pregnant with Abu Sa'id's child, fled to Amir Ali Padishah his uncle, leader of tribe of Oirad and governor of Diyarbakir. Her presence strengthened Ali Padishah's position. Seven months later, on 18 May 1336, she gave birth to a daughter. However, sources do not provide information about this child's name and life.

== Marriage to Hasan Buzurg ==
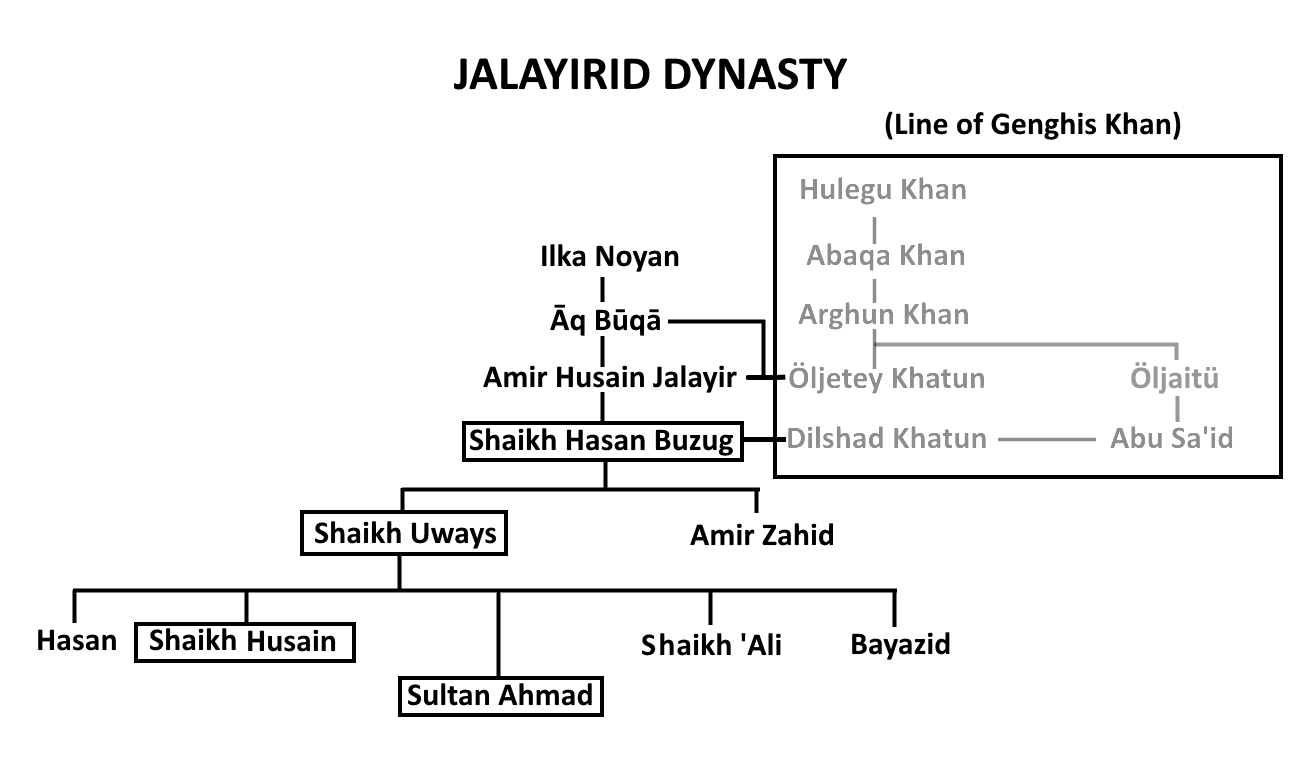
Jalayirid dynasty, and contribution from the line of Genghis Khan.

Shortly afterward Ali Padishah was defeated and killed by Hasan Buzurg, a rival claimant to the throne, who then married Dilshad. She bore Hasan, three sons: Shaikh Awais, who succeeded his father in 1356; Qasim, who died in 1367-68 and was buried in Najaf, and Zahid, who was born on 3 August 1351, shortly before his mother's death, and died in 1371–72. According to Shabankarai, she also bore Tandu Khatun.

== Political influence ==
Dilshad brought about the death of Misr Khwaja, who had killed her father. Although married to Hasan, she remained to some extent a partisan of her Chobanid kinsmen, some of whom found temporary asylum in Baghdad.

When, in the summer of 1347, her cousin Malek Ashraf led an expedition against the capital, she reportedly persuaded Hasan, who wanted to flee to the fortress of Komak on the Euphrates, to stay and defend the city. When the Chobanid army withdrew Dilshad prevented the Jalayirids from pursuit and even welcomed some of Malek Ashraf's associates.

Dilshad Khatun enjoyed undisputed power over Jalayirid Iraq, as well as considerable influence in Syria. She was said to have been charitable to the poor.

== Death ==
Dilshad Khatun died on 27 December 1351, and was buried in Najaf. It was suspected that she had been poisoned by Hasan who suspected her sympathies with Malek Ashraf. After her death, Hasan seized her agents and associates.
