= Irinjin =

Viceroy of Anatolia
- In office 27 June 1305 – 31 July 1314
- Preceded by: Sulamish
- Succeeded by: Timurtash

Viceroy of Diyar Bakr
- In office 1316–1319
- Preceded by: Sutay
- Succeeded by: Sutay

Personal details
- Died: July 1319 Soltaniyeh

Irinjin or Irenjin (Tibetan: རིན་ཆེན, fl. 1295 – c. 1319) was a powerful Kerait emir in Ilkhanate and a viceroy of Anatolia.

== Life ==
He was a son of emir Sarija (his name could also be a misreading of George) and a nephew of Doquz Khatun, thus a great-grandson of Toghrul. His father arrived in Iran with Hulagu and was buried in the Nestorian church of Maragheh. He also had a sister called Toqtani or Toqiyatai (d. 1292) who successively married to Hulagu, Abaqa and Qonqurtai. Another sister of his was Uruk Khatun, who was married to Arghun. He emerged as Baydu's supporter when he released his son Kipchak from Gaykhatu's court in 1295.

=== Rule in Anatolia ===
After accession of Öljaitü, he was appointed as the new viceroy of Anatolia in June 1305. His headquarters was centered in Niksar. Öljaitü's vizier Sa‘d al-Daula Savaji appointed his nephew Sharaf al-Din Musafir as Irinjin's tax collector, Ahmad Lakushi as vizier and emir Agacheri as his commander-in-chief. His monopolisation of duties and offices caused several officers and emirs to abandon their appointments, such as Ögedei, son of Shiktur Noyan of Jalairs. He left his post in Anatolia temporarily in 1307 to join Öljaitü's campaign in Gilan.

His rule in Anatolia was widely disapproved. In one occasion, he besieged a Turkish bey called Ilyas in Sultan Han with 20.000 Mongol soldiers, causing much damage. After end of battle, he demanded a compensation of 6000 dirhams per soldier from mutawalli of Anatolian waqfs Karim ul-Din Aqsarai. His local proteges, for example, a Turkish bey called Shemgit-oglu was known to raid and murder shaykhs, nobles and notables in Aksaray. Another protege of his, Taghachar's cousin Bilarghu had Armenian kings Hetum II and Leo III executed in 1307. After Armenian insurrection, Bilarghu had to flee to Irinjin in Sivas. After numerous complains from locals and his inability to answer Karamanid invasion of Konya, Irinjin was recalled from Anatolia in 1314.

He again gained favour when Abu Sa'id inherited Ilkhanate throne in 1316. Abu Sa'id's new regent Sevinch appointed Irinjin to governorate of Diyar Bakr, but this soon changed after Sevinch's death in 1318. New regent Chupan while appointing his own son Timurtash in Irinjin's former post in Anatolia, recalled Amir Sutai to Diyar Bakr in 1318, leaving Irinjin out of Ilkhanate politics.

== Revolt in 1319 ==
Irinjin's rivalry with Chupan, led to his adjoin of Qurumushi, another Kerait emir and commander of Mongol garrison in Georgia. Apart being both Keraites, Qurumushi and Irinjin were both related to il-khan Tekuder by marriage. Qurumushi revolted after his rebuke by Chupan, because of him not coming to aid of Abu Sa'id against invasion of Ozbeg of Golden Horde. Chupan's subordinate Toqmaq also defected to rebel side, because of his old rivalry with Demasq Kaja, son of Chupan. Irinjin's daughter Tursin's hand was sought by Toqmaq, but eventually was married to Demasq Khaja on the orders of Öljaitü. Irinjin's son Shaykh Ali was Abu Sa'id's favorite and his falconer since his governorate in Khorasan, which led some researchers to believe revolt was indeed orchestrated by Abu Sa'id himself who wanted to get rid of Chupan. Qurumushi's 40.000 strong rebel army caught Chupan with his two sons and 2000 strong entourage unguarded near Georgia and caused him to flee, this was when Irinjin openly joined the revolt.

When news of Chupan's defeat reached to Soltaniyeh, Irinjin's son and daughter agreed to plunder the belongings of Demasq Kaja, but was prevented from killing him by Ögrünch, Uyghur emir. Irinjin on his part, pillaged Timurtash's belongings in Anatolia. Rebel armies merged near Nakhchivan and set course to Abu Sa'id's main army soon later. Ilkhanate armies were commanded by Abu Sa'id himself on centre with Ögrünch and Chupan, while his Oirat uncles Ali Padshah and Muhammad was positioned on left wing. Right wing was commanded by Mahmud b. Esen Qutluq and Shayk Ali b. Ali Qushchi. On their part, Irinjin was commanding center on rebel side with his wife Princess Könchek, emir Toqmaq and his brother Aras were commanding left, while Qurumushi commanded right flank. A last second peace attempt by Qutluqshah, Irinjin's wife was in vain. A decisive battle was fought on 20 June 1319 near Mianeh with Ilkhanate victory. Irinjin was captured in vicinity of Kaghazkunan, near Khalkhal.

=== Aftermath ===
During trial at Soltaniyeh, Irinjin claimed that he was acting on Abu Sa'id's orders, a claim he rejected. He was executed in Soltaniyeh with a skewer driven up from his chin to brain. Irinjin's body was displayed for 2–3 days and his severed head was sent around Ilkhanate provinces. His 15-year-old son Vafadar were also decapitated, while his wife Könchek was trampled to death by horses. In total 36 emirs and 7 khatuns were executed, including Amir Toqmaq, Qurumishi, Princess Könchek (daughter of Tekuder) and Irinjin. Qutluqshah Khatun was spared and married off to Pulad Qiya, a brother of Amir Ordu Qiya. Shaykh Ali was already executed before battle.

== Religion ==
Irinjin was a Nestorian and likewise, had Christian family. His family was interred at Mar Shalita church of Maragheh, to which he donated a revenue of a village and prevented it from being converted to a mosque. He was also reported to be a close friend of Mar Yahballaha III.

== Family ==
He was married to Tekuder's daughter Könchek Khatun (d. 1319) and had more wives including a certain Sarijah with whom he had several offsprings:

1. Shaykh Ali (d. 1319) — married to a daughter of Essen Qutluqh on 28 April 1305
2. Qutluqshah Khatun — betrothed 18 March 1305, m. 20 June 1305 to Öljaitü, then Pulad Qiya
3. Tursin Khatun (d. 1324) — married to Demasq Kaja
4. Vafadar (1304 - 1319)

Through his daughter Tursin Khatun, he became ancestor of Jalayirids on the maternal side.
