= Öljaitü =

Ilkhan from 1304 to 1316

Öljaitü Muhammad Khodabandeh
- Pādishāh-i Īrānzamīn (Padishah of the Land of Iran)
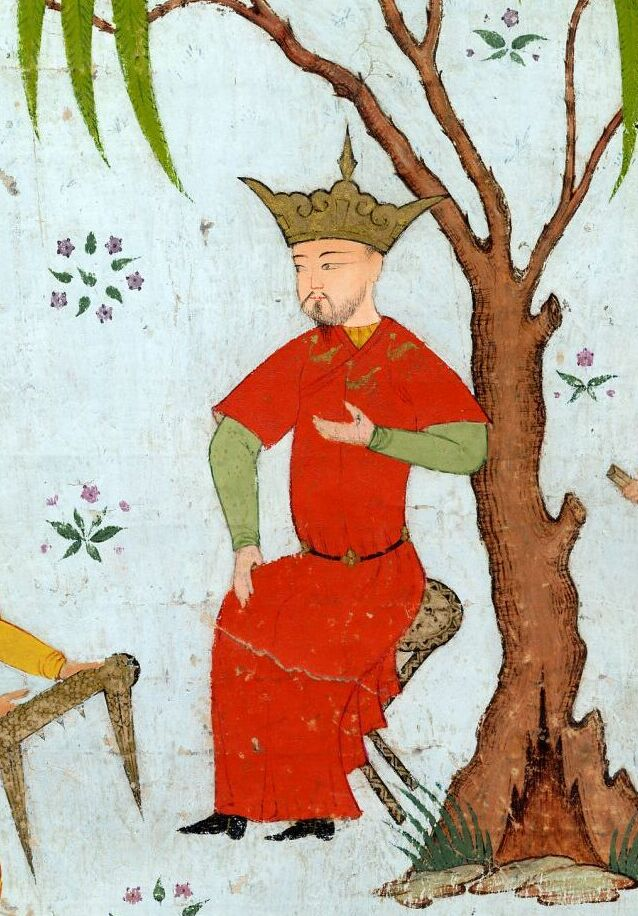
- Öljaitü and ambassadors from the Yuan dynasty, 1438, "Majma' al-Tavarikh"

Ilkhan
- Reign: 9 July 1304 – 16 December 1316
- Coronation: 19 July 1304
- Predecessor: Ghazan
- Successor: Abu Sa'id

Viceroy of Khorasan
- Reign: 1296 – 1304
- Predecessor: Nirun Aqa
- Successor: Abu Sa'id
- Born: 24 March 1282; Between Sarakhs and Merv, Khorasan, Ilkhanate
- Died: 16 December 1316 (aged 34); Soltaniyeh, Ilkhanate
- Burial: Dome of Soltaniyeh, Soltaniyeh
- Spouse: Hajji Khatun; Eltuzmish Khatun
- Issue: Bastam; Tayghur; Sulayman Shah; Abu'l Khayr; Abu Sa'id; Ilchi (alleged); Dowlandi Khatun; Sati Beg; Sultan Khatun
Regnal name
- Ghiyath al-Din Muhammad Khudabanda Öljaitü Sultan
- House: Borjigin
- Dynasty: Hulaguid
- Father: Arghun
- Mother: Uruk Khatun
- Religion: Buddhism (until 1291); Christianity (until 1295); Sunni Islam (until 1310); Shia Islam (until his death)

Öljaitü, (Note: Mongolian: ᠦᠯᠵᠠᠢᠲᠦ ᠬᠠᠨ, romanized: Öljaitü Qan, Persian: اولجایتو. Also occasionally spelled Oljeitu, Olcayto, Uljeitu, Öljaitu, or Ölziit.) also known as Mohammad-e Khodabandeh (Note: Persian: محمد خدابنده, romanized: khodābande, meaning the 'slave of God' or 'servant of God' in Persian) (24 March 1282 – 16 December 1316), was the eighth Ilkhanid dynasty ruler from 1304 to 1316 in Tabriz, Iran. His name 'Öljaitü' means 'blessed' in the Mongolian language and his last name 'Khodabandeh' means 'God's servant' in the Persian language.

He was the son of the Ilkhan ruler Arghun, brother and successor of Mahmud Ghazan (5th successor of Genghis Khan), and great-grandson of the Ilkhanate founder Hulegu Khan.

== Early life ==
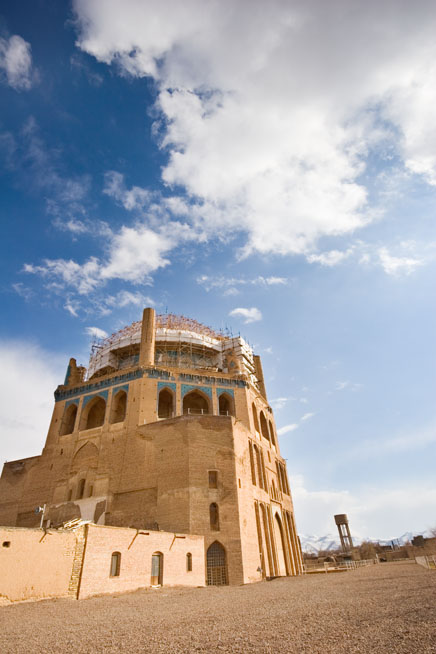
The mausoleum of Öljaitü at Soltaniyeh, Iran.

Öljaitü was born to Arghun and his third wife, Keraite Christian Uruk Khatun on 24 March 1282 during his father's viceroyalty in Khorasan. He was given the name Khar-banda (mule driver) at birth, raised as Buddhist and later baptised in 1291, receiving the name Nikolya (Nicholas) after Pope Nicholas IV. However, according to Tarikh-i Uljaytu (History of Oljeitu), Öljeitu was at first known as "Öljei Buqa", and then "Temüder", and finally "Kharbanda". Various c. Same source also mentions that it rained when he was born, and the delighted Mongols called him by the Mongolian name Öljeitu (Өлзийт), meaning auspicious. He was later converted to Sunni Islam along with his brother Ghazan. Like his brother, he changed his first name to the Islamic name Muhammad.

He participated in battles involving Ghazan's fight against Baydu. After his brother Ghazan's accession to throne, he was appointed as viceroy of Khorasan. Despite being appointed heir of Ghazan since 1299, after hearing news of his death he sought to eliminate potential rivals to throne. First such act was taken against Prince Alafrang, son of Gaykhatu. He was killed by an emissary of Öljaitü on 30 May 1304. Another powerful emir, Horqudaq was likewise captured and executed.

== Reign ==
He arrived in the Ujan plain on 9 July 1304 and was crowned on 19 July 1304. Rashid al-Din wrote that he adopted the name Oljeitu following Yuan emperor Öljeitu Temür enthroned in Dadu. His full regnal title was Ghiyath al-Din Muhammad Khudabanda Öljaitü Sultan. Upon accession, he made several appointments, such Qutluqshah to the post of commander-in-chief of Ilkhanate army, Rashid al-Din and Sa'd al-Din Savaji as his viziers on 22 July 1304. Another appointment was Asil al-Din, son of Nasir al-Din Tusi as his father's successor to head Maragheh observatory. Another political decision was revoking Kerman from Qutluqkhanid Qutb al-Din Shah Jahan on 21 April 1304. Öljaitü appointed his father-in-law and uncle Irinjin as viceroy of Anatolia on 27 June 1305.

He received ambassadors from the Yuan dynasty (19 September 1305), Chagatai Khanate (in persons of Chapar, son of Kaidu and Duwa, son of Baraq) and Golden Horde (8 December 1305) in the same year, establishing an intra-Mongol peace. His reign also saw a wave of migration from Central Asia during 1306. Certain Borjigid princes, such as Mingqan Ke'un (grandson of Ariq Böke and grandfather of future Arpa Ke'un), Sarban (son of Kaidu), Temür (a descendant of Jochi Qasar) arrived in Khorasan with 30.000 or 50.000 followers.

He undertook an expedition to Herat against the Kartid ruler Fakhr al-Din in 1306, but succeeded only briefly; his emir Danishmend was killed during the ambush. He started his second military campaign in June 1307 towards Gilan. It was a success thanks to combines forces of emirs like Sutai, Esen Qutluq, Irinjin, Sevinch, Chupan, Toghan and Mu'min. Despite initial success, his commander-in-chief Qutluqshah was defeated and killed during the campaign, which paved way for Chupan to rise in ranks. Following this, he ordered another campaign against Kartids, this time commanded by the late emir Danishmend's son Bujai. Bujai was successful after a siege from 5 February to 24 June 1306, finally capturing the citadel. A corps of Frankish mangonel specialists is known to have accompanied the Ilkhanid army in this conquest.

Another important event of 1307 was the completion of the Jami al-Tawarikh by Rashid al-Din on 14 April 1307. Later in 1307, a revolt broke in Kurdistan under the leadership of certain Musa, who claimed to be the Mahdi. The uprising was swiftly defeated. Another religious revolt, this time by 10.000 strong Christians, broke out in Irbil. Despite Mar Yahballaha's best efforts to avert the impending doom, the citadel was at last taken after a siege by Ilkhanate troops and Kurdish tribesmen on 1 July 1310, and all the defenders were massacred, including many of the Assyrian inhabitants of the lower town.

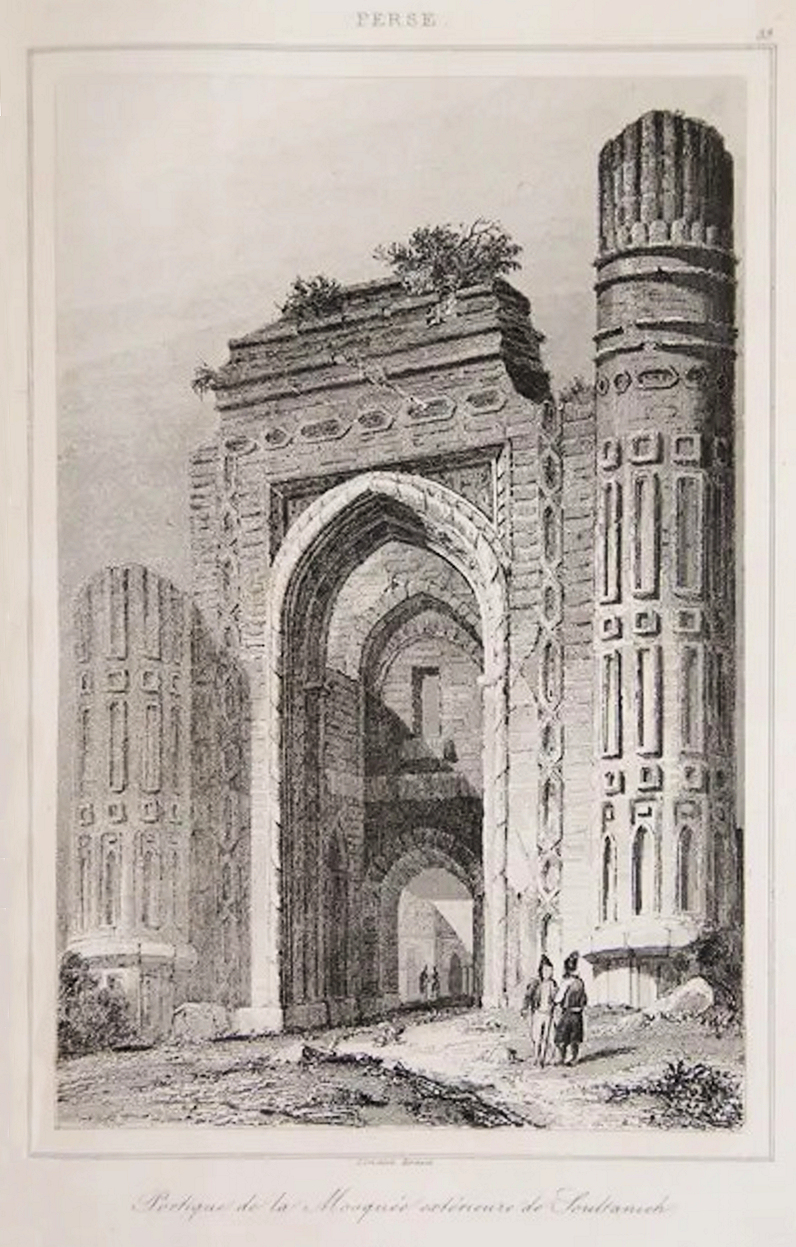
Friday Mosque of Soltaniyeh, built by Uljaytu. A possible prototype of the Bibi-Khanym Mosque. François Préault in 1808.

An important change in administration happened in 1312 when Öljaitü's vizier Sa'd al-Din Savaji was arrested on charges of corruption and executed on 20 February 1312. He was soon replaced by Taj al-Din Ali Shah, who would head the Ilkhanate civil administration until 1323. Another victim of the purge was Taj al-Din Avaji, a follower of Sa'd al-Din. Öljaitü also finally launched a last campaign against the Mamluks, in which he was unsuccessful, though he reportedly briefly took Damascus. It was when Mamluk emirs, former governor of Aleppo—Shams al-Din Qara Sonqur and governor of Tripoli—al-Afram defected to Öljaitü. Despite extradition requests from Egypt, Ilkhan invested Qara Sonqur (now under the new name Aq Sonqur) with the governorate of Maragheh and al-Afram with Hamadan. Qara Sonqur was later given Oljath—daughter of Abaqa Khan on 17 January 1314.

Meanwhile, relations between other Mongol realms were getting heated. The new khan of Golden Horde, Ozbeg sent an emissary to Öljaitü, renewing his claims to Azerbaijan on 13 October 1312. Öljaitü also supported the latter during Chagatai-Yuan war in 1314, annexing Southern Afghanistan after expelling Qara'unas. After repelling Chagatai armies, he appointed his son Abu Sa'id to govern Khorasan and Mazandaran in 1315 with the Uyghur noble Amir Sevinch as his guardian. Another descendant of Jochi Qasar, Baba Oghul arrived from Central Asia in the same year, pillaging Khwarazm on his way, causing much disturbance. Upon protests from Golden Horde emissaries, Öljaitü had to execute Baba, claiming he was not informed of such unauthorized acts.

Öljaitü's reign is also remembered for a brief effort at Ilkhanid invasion of Hijaz. Humaydah ibn Abi Numayy, arrived at the Ilkhanate court in 1315, Ilkhan on his part provided Humaydah an army of several thousand Mongols and Arabs under the command of Sayyid Talib al-Dilqandi to bring the Hijaz under Ilkhanid control. However, soon after the expedition passed Basra they received news of Ilkhan's death, and a large part of the army deserted. The remainder – three hundred Mongols and four hundred Arabs – were crushed by a horde of four thousand Bedouin led by Muhammad ibn Isa (brother of Muhanna ibn Isa) in March 1317.

== Death ==
He died in Soltaniyeh on 17 December 1316, having reigned for twelve years and nine months. Afterwards, Rashid al-Din Hamadani was accused of having caused his death by poisoning and was executed. Oljeitu was succeeded by his son Abu Sa'id.

== Religion ==
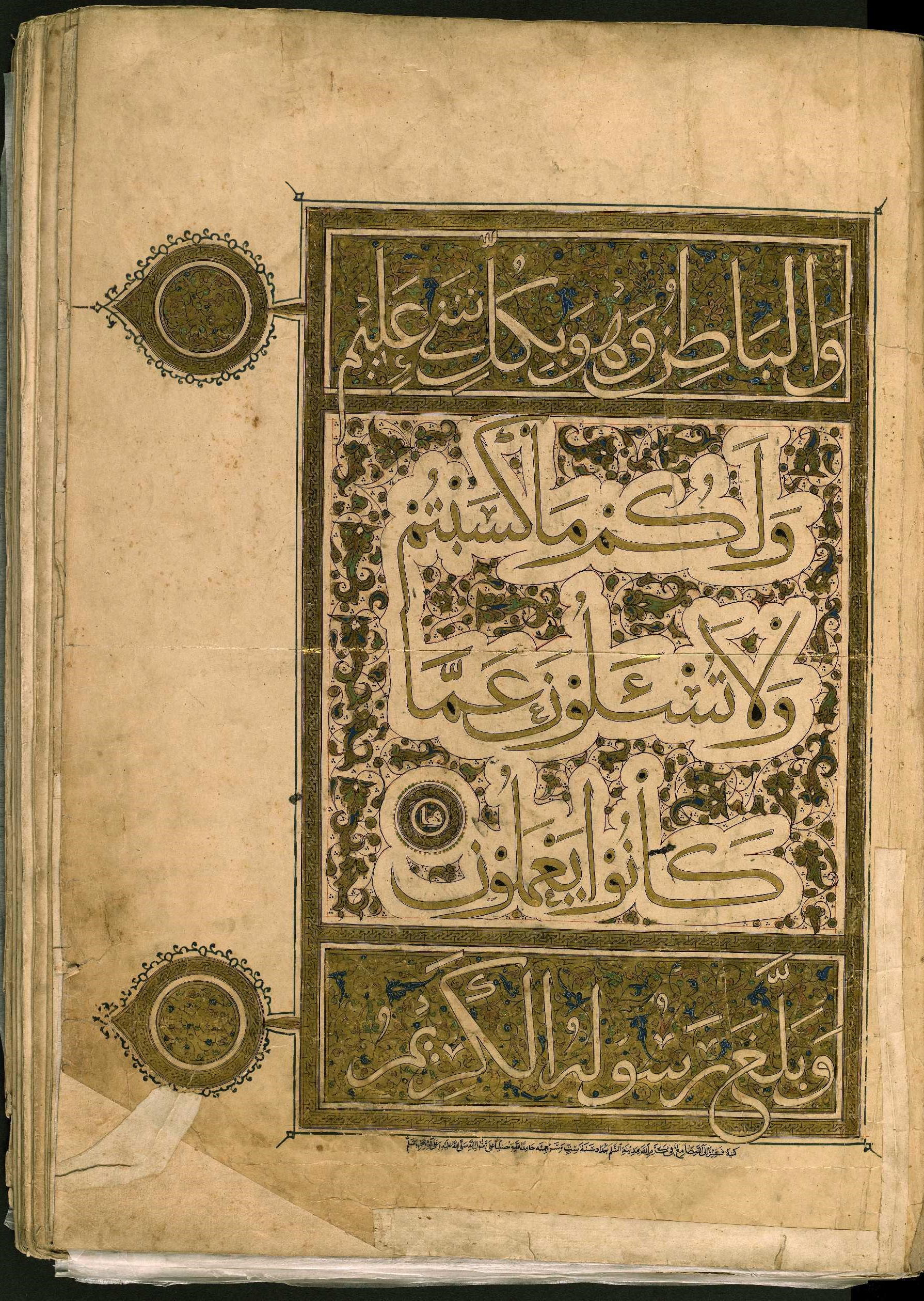
Two illuminated Koran verses. Öljaitü's Koran from Baghdad in the Oriental Manuscripts of the Leipzig University Library.

Öljaitü had been professing Buddhism, Christianity and Islam throughout his life. After succeeding his brother, Öljeitu became influenced by Shi'a theologians Al-Hilli and Maitham Al Bahrani. Although another source indicates he converted to Islam through the persuasions of his wife. Upon Al-Hilli's death, Oljeitu transferred his teacher's remains from Baghdad to a domed shrine he built in Soltaniyeh. Later, alienated by the factional strife between the Sunnis, Oljeitu changed his school of thought to Shi'a Islam in 1310. At some point, he even considered converting to Tengriism in early 1310. Mamluk historian al-Safadi mentioned in his biographical dictionary Aʻyan al-ʻAsr that Oljeitu had once again became Sunni in the last few years before his death in the Ramadan of 716 AH.

== Legacy ==
He oversaw the end of construction of city of Soltaniyeh on Qongqur-Oleng plains in 1306. In 1309, Öljeitu founded a Dar al-Sayyedah ("Sayyed's lodge") in Shiraz, Iran, and endowed it with an income of 10,000 dananeer a year. His tomb in Soltaniyeh, 300 km west of Tehran, remains the best known monument of Ilkhanid Persia. According to Ruy González de Clavijo, his body was later exhumed by Miran Shah.

== Relations with Europe ==
=== Trade contacts ===
Trading contacts with European powers were very active during the reign of Öljeitu. The Genoese had first appeared in the capital of Tabriz in 1280, and they maintained a resident Consul by 1304. Oljeitu also gave full trading rights to the Venetians through a treaty in 1306 (another such treaty with his son Abu Said was signed in 1320). According to Marco Polo, Tabriz was specialized in the production of gold and silk, and Western merchants could purchase precious stones in quantities.

=== Military alliance ===
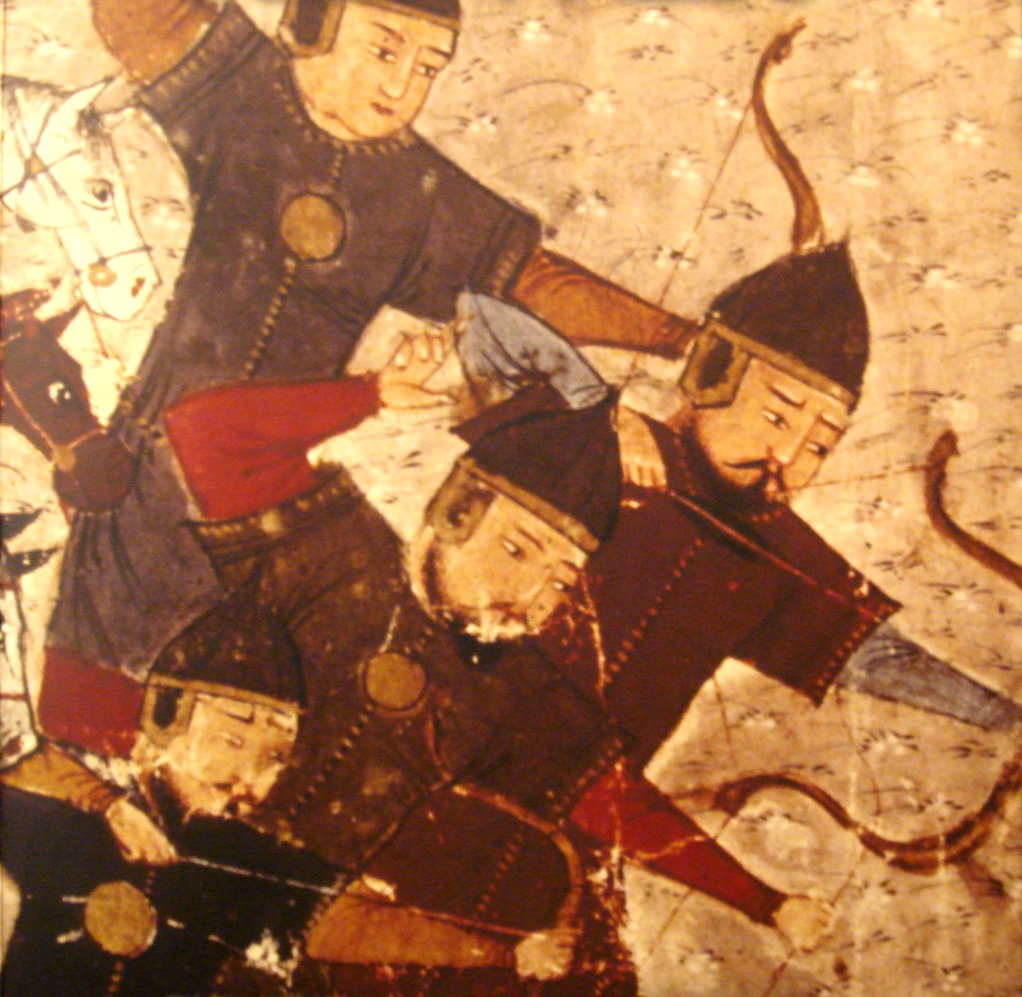
Mongol soldiers at the time of Öljeitü, in Jami al-Tawarikh by Rashid-al-Din Hamadani, BnF. MS. Supplément Persan 1113. 1430-1434 AD.

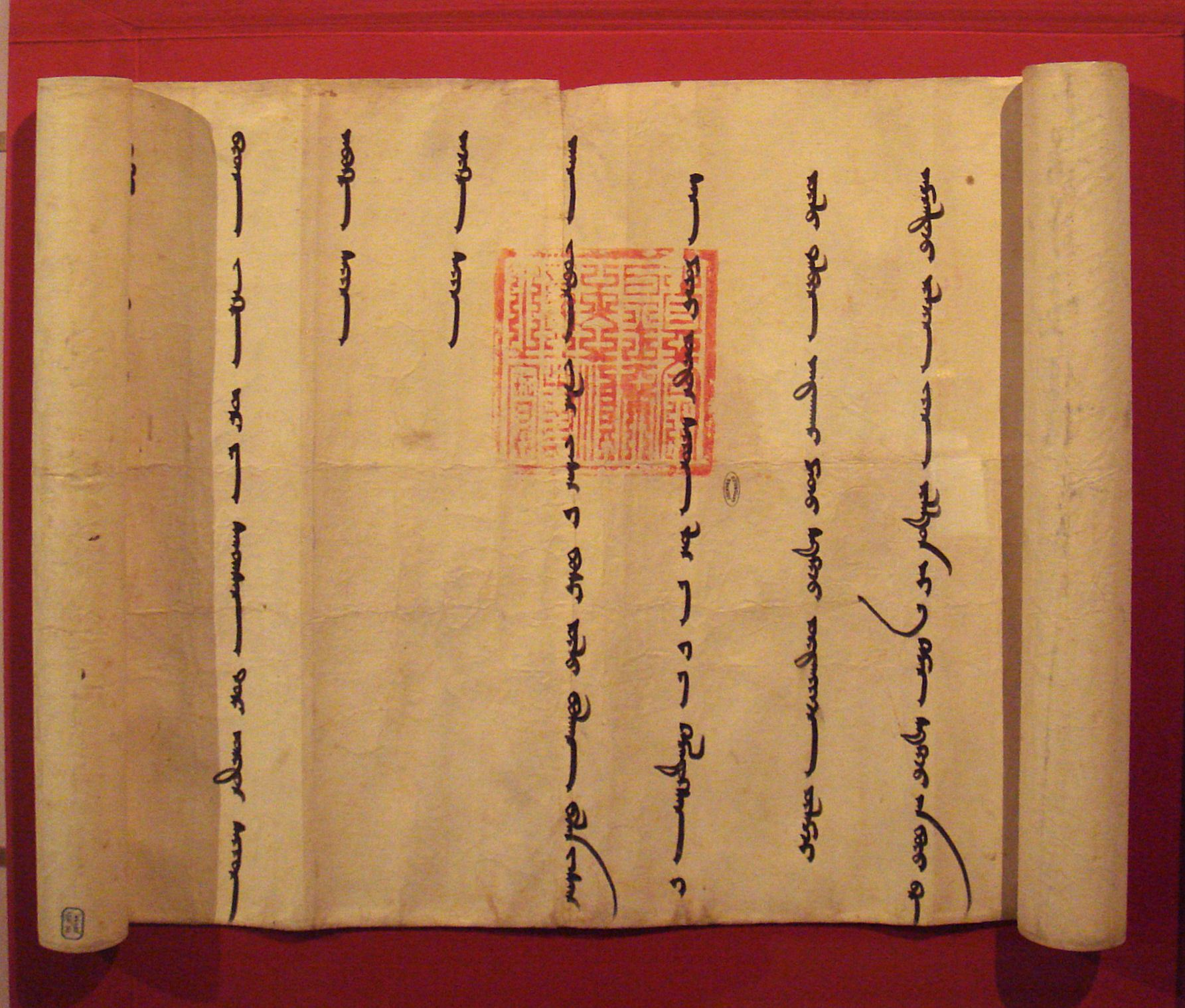
Letter of Öljeitu to Philippe le Bel, 1305. Written in classical Mongolian script, bearing the Chinese seal reading "真命皇帝天順萬夷之寶" in Classical Chinese bestowed by Temür Khan of Yuan. The huge roll measures 302x50 cm.

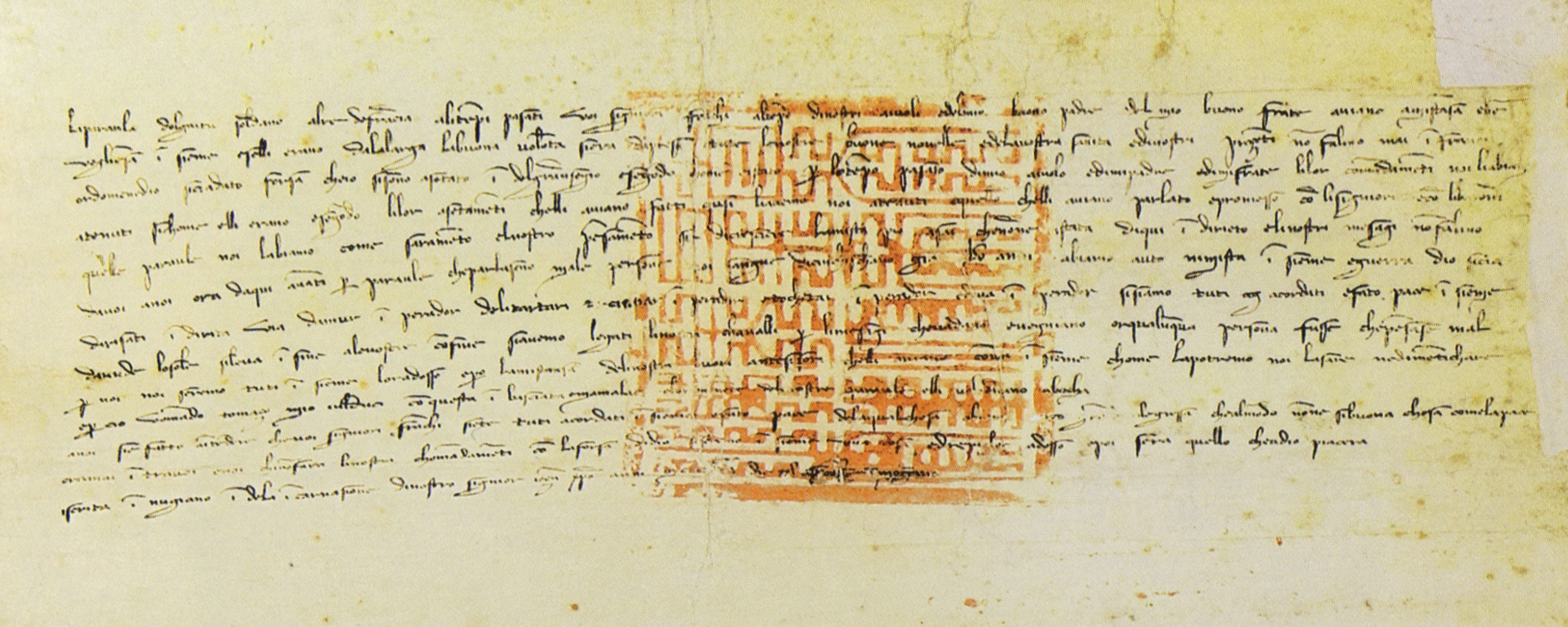
Translation of Öljeitu's message by Buscarello de Ghizolfi, on the back of the letter (visible here).

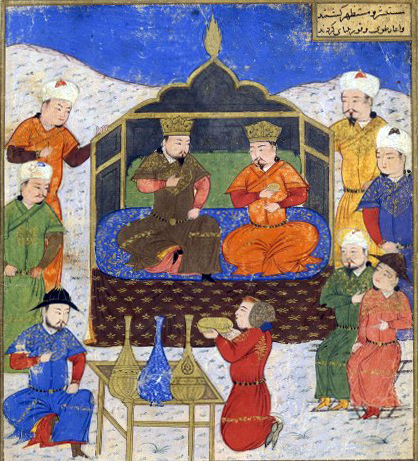
Ghazan and his brother Öljaitü.

After his predecessors Arghun and Ghazan, Öljeitu continued diplomatic overtures with the West, and re-stated Mongol hopes for an alliance between the Christian nations of Europe and the Mongols against the Mamluks, even though Öljeitu himself had converted to Islam.

==== 1305 embassy ====
In April 1305, he sent a Mongol embassy led by Buscarello de Ghizolfi to the French king Philip IV of France, Pope Clement V, and Edward I of England. The letter to Philip IV, the only one to have survived, describes the virtues of concord between the Mongols and the Franks:

"We, Sultan Oljaitu. We speak. We, who by the strength of the Sky, rose to the throne (...), we, descendant of Genghis Khan (...). In truth, there cannot be anything better than concord. If anybody was not in concord with either you or ourselves, then we would defend ourselves together. Let the Sky decide!"

— Extract from the letter of Oljeitu to Philip the Fair. French national archives.

He also explained that internal conflicts between the Mongols were now over:

"Now all of us, Timur Khagan, Tchapar, Toctoga, Togba and ourselves, main descendants of Gengis-Khan, all of us, descendants and brothers, are reconciled through the inspiration and the help of God. So that, from Nangkiyan (China) in the Orient, to Lake Dala our people are united and the roads are open."

— Extract from the letter of Oljeitu to Philip the Fair. French national archives.

This message reassured the European nations that the Franco-Mongol alliance, or at least attempts towards such an alliance, had not ceased, even though the Khans had converted to Islam.

==== 1307 embassy ====
Another embassy was sent to the West in 1307, led by Tommaso Ugi di Siena, an Italian described as Öljeitu's ildüchi ("Sword-bearer"). This embassy encouraged Pope Clement V to speak in 1307 of the strong possibility that the Mongols could remit the Holy Land to the Christians, and to declare that the Mongol embassy from Öljeitu "cheered him like spiritual sustenance". Relations were quite warm: in 1307, the Pope named John of Montecorvino the first Archbishop of Khanbalik and Patriarch of the Orient.

European nations accordingly prepared a crusade, but were delayed. A memorandum drafted by the Grand Master of the Knights Hospitallers Guillaume de Villaret about military plans for a Crusade envisaged a Mongol invasion of Syria as a preliminary to a Western intervention (1307/8).

==== Military operation 1308 ====
Byzantine Emperor Andronicus II gave a daughter in marriage to Oljeitu and asked the Ilkhan's assistance against growing the power of the Ottomans. In 1305, Oljeitu promised his father in law 40,000 men, and in 1308 dispatched 30,000 men to recover many Byzantine towns in Bithynia and the Ilkhanid army crushed a detachment of Osman I.

==== 1313 embassy ====
On 4 April 1312, a Crusade was promulgated by Pope Clement V at the Council of Vienne. Another embassy was sent by Oljeitu to the West and to Edward II in 1313. That same year, the French king Philippe le Bel "took the cross", making the vow to go on a Crusade in the Levant, thus responding to Clement V's call for a Crusade. He was however warned against leaving by Enguerrand de Marigny, and died soon after in a hunting accident.

A final settlement with the Mamluks would only be found when Oljeitu's son signed the Treaty of Aleppo with the Mamluks in 1322.

== Family ==
Öljaitü had thirteen consorts with several issues, albeit only one surviving son and daughter:

- Terjughan Khatun, daughter of Lagzi Güregen (son of Arghun Aqa) and Baba Khatun
  - Dowlandi Khatun (died 1314) married on 30 September 1305 to Amir Chupan
- Eltuzmish Khatun (m. 1296, d. 10 October 1308, buried in Dome of Sultaniyeh), daughter of Qutlugh Timur Kurkan of the Khongirad, sister of Taraqai Kurkan (widow of Abaqa Khan and previously that of Gaykhatu Khan)
  - Bastam (1297 - d. 15 October 1309 near Sahneh) - married Uljay Qutlugh Khatun on 12 January 1305 (named after Bayazid Bastami)
  - Bayazid (d. 19 April 1308) (named after Bayazid Bastami)
  - Muhammad Tayfur (b. 3 December 1306) (named after Bayazid Bastami)
  - Sati Beg Khatun - with Eltuzmish Khatun, married firstly on 6 September 1319 to Amir Chupan, married secondly in 1336 to Arpa Ke'un, married thirdly in 1339 to Suleiman Khan;
- Hajji Khatun of the Oirat, daughter of Chichak, son of Sulamish and Todogaj Khatun;
  - Abu Sa'id Bahadur Khan
- Qutlughshah Khatun (betrothed 18 March 1305, m. 20 June 1305), daughter of Irinjin, and Konchak Khatun;
  - Sultan Khatun
- Bulughan Khatun Khurasani (m. 23 June 1305, d. 5 January 1310 in Baghdad), daughter of Tasu and Mangli Tegin Khatun (widow of Ghazan Khan)
- Kunjuskab Khatun (m. 1305), daughter of Shadi Kurkan and Orqudaq Khatun (widow of Ghazan Khan)
- Oljatai Khatun (m. 22 March 1305, died 4 October 1315) - half-sister of Hajji Khatun (widow of Arghun Khan), daughter of Sulamish and Todogaj Khatun
  - Abu'l Khayr (b. 1305, died in infancy, buried next to Ghazan in Shanb Ghazan)
- Soyurghatmish Khatun, daughter of Amir Husayn Jalayir, and sister of Hasan Buzurg;
- Qongtai Khatun, daughter of Timur Kurkan;
- Dunya Khatun, daughter of al-Malik al-Malik Najm ad-Din Ghazi, ruler of Mardin;
- Adil Shah Khatun, daughter of Amir Sartaq, the amir-ordu of Bulughan Khatun Buzurg;
  - Sulayman Shah (d. 10 August 1310)
- Despina Khatun, daughter of Andronikos II Palaiologos;
- Tugha Khatun, a lady accused of having an affair with Demasq Kaja;

Öljaitü also allegedly had an additional son, Ilchi who was claimed as an ancestor of the Arghun and Tarkhan dynasties of Afghanistan and India.

== See also ==
- Hazara people
- Olcayto

== Notes ==
=== Citations ===
Regnal titles
Preceded by Mahmud Ghazan	Ilkhanid dynasty 1304–1316	Succeeded by Abu Sa'id
