= Kaja Beedi =

Cigarette brand

Kajah Beedi is a beedi (cigarette) brand from Thrissur in Kerala, India. It is produced in Chavakkad in Thrissur District. The brand is owned by Kajah Beedi Company of Rajah Group. The company was started in 1948 by Hajee A Abdul Kader Sahib. Around 45,000 workers work in this company.
