= Caia (music) =

Electronica duo

Caia is an electronica duo comprising Maiku Takahashi and Andy Cato.

== Background ==
Takahashi and Cato met in Japan while Cato toured in 1998. They released the band's debut studio album, The Magic Dragon, in 2003.

== Discography ==
- The Magic Dragon (2003)
