= Sorqan Shira =

Mongolian aristocrat

- Children: Chilaun
- Military career
- Rank: General of the Mongol Empire

Sorqan Shira or Sorgan Shira (Mongolian: Сорхон шар) was one of the Nine Ministers of Genghis Khan and an ancestor of the Chobanids. He belonged to the Suldus clan of the Taichiuds, originally being a farmworker under the Taichiud chief Todoene-Girte.

Sorqan Shira first appeared in The Secret History of the Mongols, when Temujin managed to escape from Taichiud captivity in 1177. Passing by, Sorgan-Shira noticed a young man hiding in a river backwater, but reassured him, promising not to give out. Several times, Sorgan Shira persuaded the pursuers to continue the search for the fugitive elsewhere. As soon as they dispersed, Temujin headed for his savior's yurt, hoping for further help. Frightened by a possible revelation, Sorgan Shira was about to refuse Temujin, but his sons Chilaun and Chimbay stood up for the young Temujin. They removed and burned the block into which Temujin had been chained, and Sorgan himself hid him in a pile of sheep's wool, instructing his daughter Qa'daan to look after the fugitive.

He was found by Genghis Khan in 1201, after a battle with the Taichiuds. Submitting to Genghis Khan, Sorgan Shira and his sons became generals for Genghis, and his son Chilaun personally killed Taichiud chief Targutai-Kiriltukh. He was among ninety five generals who were granted a mingghan during the coronation of Genghis Khan in 1206.
