= Kaja Martin =

American film producer

- Known for: American film producer and actress
- Height: 5 ft 9 in (175 cm)

Kaja Martin is an American actor, comedian, writer, director, and film producer.

== Early life and education ==
Martin was born and raised in Palo Alto, California. She graduated from Henry M. Gunn High School. From there, she went on to Occidental College where she studied film and theater.

== Career ==
=== YouTube ===
Kaja Martin was a series regular on Equals Three Productions Booze Lightyear, Date Debate, Comedians On. She took over as host of The Equals Three Show in 2015.

Vice-President of production company Equals Three Studios, which has a combined online audience of over 17 million followers, Kaja has helmed several successful YouTube shows including: The Equals Three Show, Top 6, Booze Lightyear, Comedians On, and Date Debate. As of 2017, the YouTube channel had earned more than three billion views and 10.4 million subscribers, making it one of the most viewed channels on YouTube at the time.

Martin transitioned to producing narrative shorts and web series with projects Riley Rewind and Miss Earth. Riley rewind first premiered on Facebook in 2013 and quickly after was sold to Netflix. Miss Earth was partially financed by Brian Grazer and Ron Howard's production company New Form Digital. After its premier Miss Earth was adapted into a web series retitled Miss 2059 and released on Verizon's go90 app in June 2016.

=== Film ===
Martin is the co-creator (with digital influencer Ray William Johnson) of the film production company, Mom & Pop Empire. Currently they are working on a documentary project seeking to expose internet service provider monopolies. Martin and Johnson are co-producers along with Marc Hustvedt and Max Benator's Supergravity Pictures. Mom & Pop Empire had previously co-produced the film Manson Family Vacation with Jay and Mark Duplass. The film premiered at South by Southwest in 2015 and its distribution rights were purchased by Netflix soon after. Martin also worked as an actor and producer with digital influencer, Anna Akana, on several short films.

Year	Title	Actress	Producer	Writer
2015	Booze Lightyear	Yes	Yes	Yes
2015	Equals Three	Yes	Yes	Yes
2015	Top 6		Yes	
2016	Date Debate		Yes	
2015	Comedians On		Yes	
2015	Manson Family Vacation		Yes	
2014	Nola		Yes	
2014	Tortoise		Yes	
2014	Miss Earth	Yes	Yes	
2014	Here She Is		Yes	
2014	Pregnapocalypse	Yes	Yes	
2014	The Girl Who Loved Godzilla	Yes	Yes	
2014	T Minus Two	Yes	Yes	
2014	Emergency Call	Yes	Yes	
2014	Sharp		Yes	
2014	Afflicted, Inc.	Yes	Yes	
2014	Hallucination		Yes	
2013	Riley Rewind	Yes	Yes	
2012	Until College	Yes		
2011	Dream Job	Yes		
2010	Matted	Yes		
2009	Da' Booty Shop	Yes		

== Recognition and awards ==
- Variety – Variety magazine calls web series, Riley Rewind, the 7th best web series of 2013
- Webby Winner: Voice Award: Riley Rewind – 2014
- Fringe Winner: Theatre Unleashed Award: Reconstruction – 2012
