= Kaia Bruland Nilssen =

Kaia Bruland Nilssen (1868 – 18 January 1950) was a Norwegian novelist.

Beginning in 1895, she published several novellas and novels, and occasionally poems. She has been noted as writing non-pretentious trivial literature for a female audience. The book Aagot Vangen - et livsbillede from 1903 is a biographical novel about the Norwegian sculptor Aagot Vangen, who received her artistic education in Paris but died when still in her twenties. Kaia Bruland-Nilssen's most popular book was 1897's Sjøgutten. She also contributed to the scandal sheet Spidskuglen.

Bruland Nilssen resided near Bekkestua in Bærum. She died in 1950.

== Selected works ==
First editions only:

- Violinspilleren, 1895
- Stedmoder og steddatter, 1896
- Sjøgutten, 1897
- Forstand og hjerte, 1898
- Tante Ellen: fortælling, 1899
- Aagot Vangen: et livsbillede, 1903
- Dagmar Norgaards veninde, 1905
- Skjærgaardsliv, 1908
- Familien Granli, 1910
- Gutten som visste at hjelpe sig, 1915
- Ungdomskjærlighet, 1915
- Familiens yngste, 1917
- Alfhild Haug, 1920
- Et ægteskaps historie, 1922
- Taushet som dræper, 1929
- Liv Bille, 1933
- Fra Midnatsolens land
- Glemte melodier: juleskisser
