= Demasq Kaja =

- ᠳᠢᠮᠢᠱ ᠬᠣᠵᠠ

Vizier of Ilkhanate
- In office 1325–1327
- Appointed by: Chupan
- Monarch: Abu Sa'id Bahadur Khan
- Preceded by: Rukn al-Din Sa'in

Personal details
- Born: January-February, 1300 Near Damascus
- Died: August 24, 1327 (aged 26–27) Soltaniyeh, Ilkhanate
- Resting place: Dimashqiyya, Tabriz
- Spouse: Tursin Khatun
- Relations: Chobanids
- Children: Dilshad Khatun
- Parent: Chupan

Demasq Kaja or Dimashq Khwāja (Mongolian: ᠳᠢᠮᠢᠱ ᠬᠣᠵᠠ, romanized: Dimiš Qoǰa; Persian: دمشق خواجه, romanized: Demašq Ḵᵛājā, 1300 - August 24, 1327) was a member of the Chobanid family around the first quarter of the 14th century.

== Biography ==
He was the third son of Chupan, born during Ghazan Khan's Syrian campaign. His father named him after Damascus, who probably was born during its siege. He rose to prominence thanks to his father's rise following the death of Uyghur noble Amir Sevinch in January 1318, who was guardian of Ilkhan Abu Sa'id. 18-year old Demasq Kaja seized Shabankara district of the Fars province and dispersed it to his favorites.

His estates were plundered during revolt of Irinjin and Qurumishi in 1319 by the former's son. After their defeat, Chupan accumulated a great deal of power as an amir of the Ilkhanate. While technically serving the emir, he was the effective power behind the throne. He therefore divided up Ilkhanate between himself and his sons' influence regions. Demasq became viceroy of Azerbaijan and Iraq.

According to Safvat as-safa, he met Safi-ad-Din Ardabili in Karabakh in 1320 who was visiting with Shams al-Din Jamalan (grandson of Zahed Gilani). He would later be one of the signatories to the decree about Zahed Gilani's family.

According to an anecdote, he once saved life of Qara Sunqur, a Mamluk deserter to Ilkhanate - who was attacked by a fida'i in 1323.

Later, he gained the use of the powers that the vizier Rukn al-Din Sa'in had been invested with in 1325. Although Jean Aubin calls him as first and last Mongol vizier of Ilkhanate, there were others before him like Buqa.

During 1326 and 1327, Chupan took Rukn al-Din with him to a campaign Khurasan against Chagatai ruler Duwa. With the two gone, Demasq was effectively in control back at the Ilkhanid capital of Sultaniya. Abu Sa'id had resented the power of Chupan and his offspring for some time by now, and he plotted their fall. Since Demasq was the most imminent threat, as well as known as an arrogant emir, Abu Sa'id chose to deal with him first. When it was discovered that Demasq had been having with an affair with a former concubine of the late Ilkhan Öljeitü's, Abu Sa'id used this as a pretext for moving against him. Demasq, trapped in Sultaniyah, tried to escape, but was captured by emir Misr Khwaja in the process, on 25 August 1327. Other versions suggest that he was killed on the instigations of Narin Taghay (a nephew of Taghachar and grandson of Kitbuqa), who was previously banished from the court.

He was the first of the Chobanids to be killed; several others would soon follow. He was buried in Tabriz in a neighborhood that would later be named Dimashqiyya after him. His sister Baghdad Khatun ordered a madrasa to be built commemorating his name.

== Family ==
Demasq had one consort - Tursin Khatun (killed 1324), daughter of Irinjin and Konchak Khatun, daughter of Tekuder Khan with whom he had only daughters:

1. Dilshad Khatun (d. 1351), married firstly to Abu Sa'id Bahadur Khan, son of Öljaitü, married secondly to Shaikh Hasan Buzurg;
2. Sultan Bakht Khatun, married firstly to Amir Ilkhan, son of Shaikh Hasan Buzurg, married secondly to Masud Shah Inju;
3. Dendi Shah Khatun, married to Shaikh Ali Khushji, and mother of Misr Malik;
4. Alam Shah Khatun, married to Sultan Shah, son of Nikruz;
