= 1380 =

1380 in various calendars
- Gregorian calendar: 1380; MCCCLXXX
- Ab urbe condita: 2133
- Armenian calendar: 829; ԹՎ ՊԻԹ
- Assyrian calendar: 6130
- Balinese saka calendar: 1301–1302
- Bengali calendar: 786–787
- Berber calendar: 2330
- English Regnal year: 3 Ric. 2 – 4 Ric. 2
- Buddhist calendar: 1924
- Burmese calendar: 742
- Byzantine calendar: 6888–6889
- Chinese calendar: 己未年 (Earth Goat); 4077 or 3870 — to — 庚申年 (Metal Monkey); 4078 or 3871
- Coptic calendar: 1096–1097
- Discordian calendar: 2546
- Ethiopian calendar: 1372–1373
- Hebrew calendar: 5140–5141
- Hindu calendars
- Vikram Samvat: 1436–1437
- Shaka Samvat: 1301–1302
- Kali Yuga: 4480–4481
- Holocene calendar: 11380
- Igbo calendar: 380–381
- Iranian calendar: 758–759
- Islamic calendar: 781–782
- Japanese calendar: Kōryaku 2 (康暦２年)
- Javanese calendar: 1293–1294
- Julian calendar: 1380; MCCCLXXX
- Korean calendar: 3713
- Minguo calendar: 532 before ROC 民前532年
- Nanakshahi calendar: −88
- Thai solar calendar: 1922–1923
- Tibetan calendar: ས་མོ་ལུག་ལོ་ (female Earth-Sheep); 1506 or 1125 or 353 — to — ལྕགས་ཕོ་སྤྲེ་ལོ་ (male Iron-Monkey); 1507 or 1126 or 354

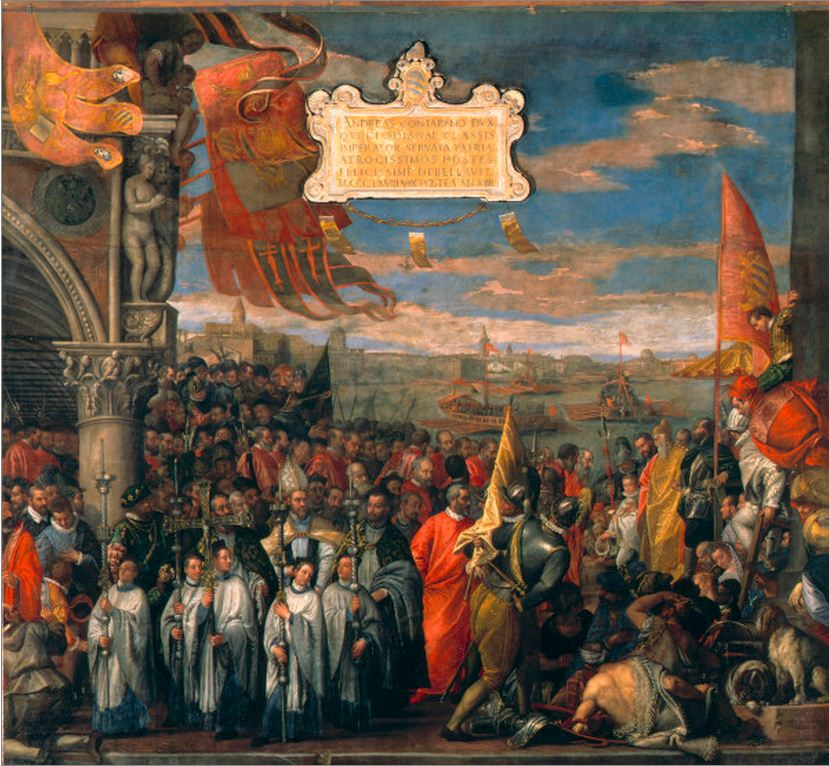
June 25: Andrea Contarini, Doge of the Republic of Venice, celebrates the triumph over the Republic of Genoa at Chioggia.

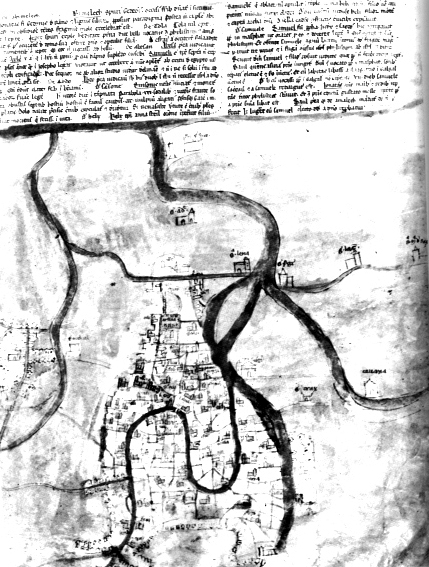
The earliest surviving map of Venice, from a 1380 codex of Paolino Veneto.

Year 1380 (MCCCLXXX) was a leap year starting on Sunday of the Julian calendar.

== Events ==
=== January–March ===
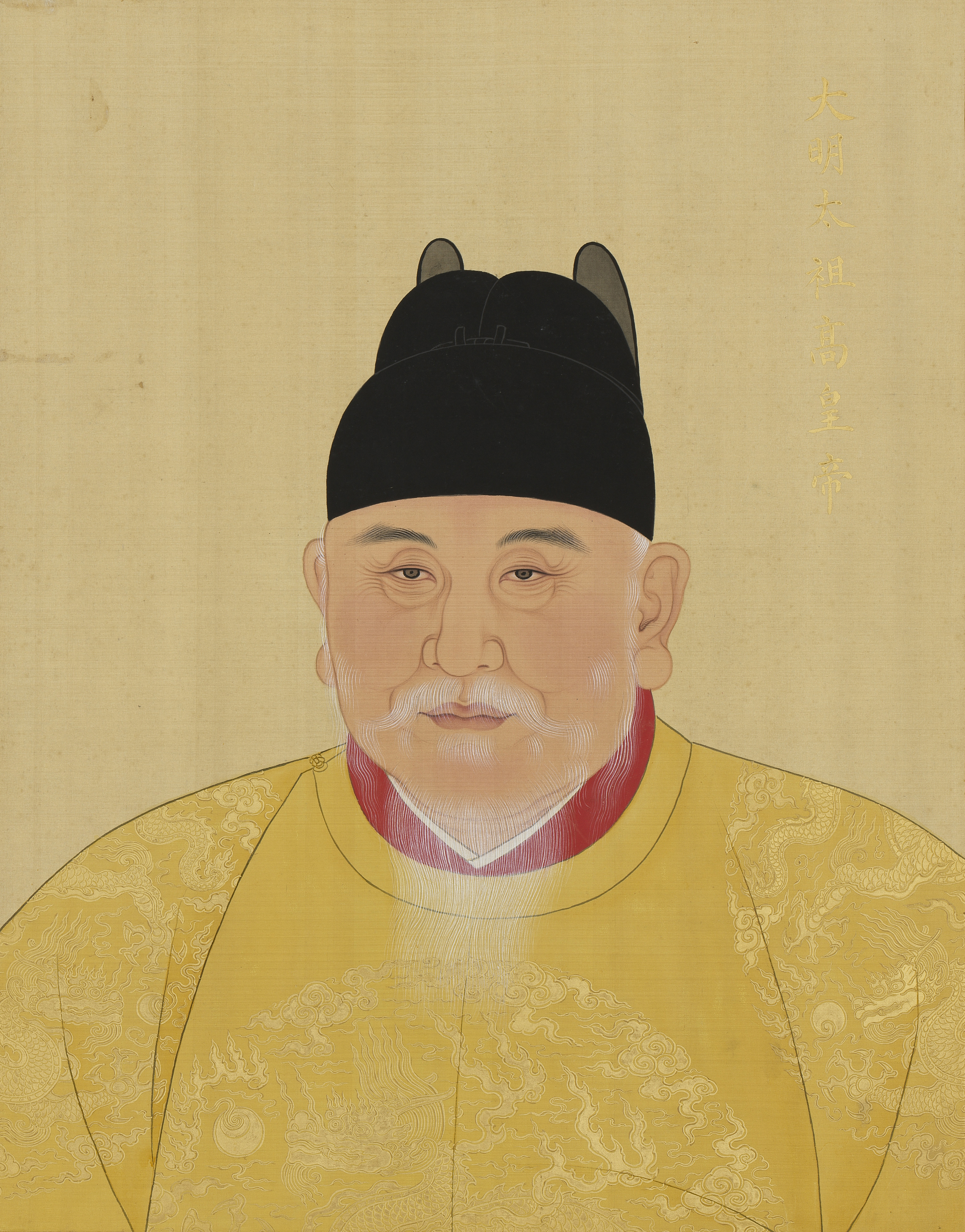
the Emperor Hongwu

- January 1 – The Republic of Venice's Admiral Carlo Zeno returns to Venice with 18 ships, after the city is on the verge of falling to conquest by the Republic of Genoa.
- January 16 – The fourth parliament of King Richard II assembles at Westminster after being summoned on October 20 for a six week session. The House of Commons elects Sir John Guildesborough as Speaker of the House.
- January 30 – Simon Sudbury, the Archbishop of Canterbury, becomes the new Lord Chancellor of England, succeeding Baron Scrope of Bolton. Sudbury will continue in office as both archbishop and lord chancellor until his assassination on June 14, 1381, during the Peasants' Revolt.
- February 12 – Hu Weiyong, the Grand Chancellor of Ming dynasty China, is accused of treason and executed as the Emperor Zhu Yuanzhang (Emperor Hongwu) begins a purge of over 30,000 people perceived as opponents of the Imperial government.
- March 3 – The 4th English parliament of King Richard II adjourns, and the King gives royal assent to the Assize of Cloths Act 1379 (providing a penalty for "the aulneger that setteth his seal to faulty cloths" and to the Farming of Benefices for Aliens Act 1379 (providing that "None shall take any benefice of an alien, or convey money to him.")
- March 4 – The impostor Paul Palaiologos Tagaris becomes noticed by the Eastern Orthodox church when he donates a purported Christian relic, the skull of James the Just, the 1st century leader of the Church of Jerusalem, to the city of Ancona.
- March 13 – The southern England town of Winchelsea in East Sussex is attacked and burned by an expeditionary force from France for a second time.

=== April–June ===
- April 17 – The impostor Tagaris follows his donation of relics to Ancona with what he claims is one of the nails from the True Cross upon which Jesus of Nazareth had been crucified in the first century, as well as a foot from the skeleton of Saint Anne, mother of the Virgin Mary and grandmother of Jesus. His claims are believed by the leaders of Ancona and he is appointed as the Latin Patriarch of Constantinople by Pope Urban VI .
- May 31 – Grand Duke of Lithuania Jogaila signs the secret Treaty of Dovydiškės, with the Teutonic Knights. This sparks a civil war with his uncle Kęstutis.
- June 24 – At the Battle of Chioggia, the navy of the Republic of Venice, with 48 galleys, defeats the invading fleet of the Republic of Genoa, clearing a blockade of the Venetian harbor, regaining control of the Adriatic Sea, and beginning the dominance of the Venetian Navy. Venice supplements its fleet with the capture of 17 of Genoa's ships.

=== July–September ===
- July 29 – At the age of 10, King Olaf II of Denmark is proclaimed as King Olaf IV of Norway, with his mother Margete) as regent. Iceland and the Faroe Islands, as parts of Norway, pass under the Danish crown.
- August 26 – King Richard II of England summons the English Parliament five months after the dissolution of the previous meeting, and directs the members of the House of Commons and House of Lords to assemble on November 5 at Westminster.
- August – At Kayseri (now in Turkey, Muhammad II Chelebi is crowned at the age of 7 as the new Sultan of Eretna upon the death of his father, Sultan Ala al-Din Ali, from a plague.
- September 8 – At the Battle of Kulikovo, Russian forces under Grand Prince Dmitry Donskoy of Moscow resist a large invasion, led by Mamai Khan, commander of the Blue Horde of Lithuania and Ryazan, stopping their advance.
- September 16 – Charles V of France is succeeded by his twelve-year-old son, Charles VI.

=== October–December ===
- October 2 – Caterina Visconti marries her first cousin, Gian Galeazzo Visconti, later Duke of Milan, at the Church of San Giovanni in Conca.
- November 3 – Charles VI of France, who succeeded his father (Charles V of France) in September, is crowned.
- November 5 – The English parliament assembles, and the House of Commons re-elects Sir John Guildesborough as its speaker.
- November 7 – Sheikh Karimul Makhdum, a Syrian Sunni Muslim missionary, brings the religion of Islam to the Philippine Islands by establishing a mosque on the island of Tawi-Tawi. The date of November 7 is now celebrated annually as a holiday in the Bangsamoro region of the Philippines.
- December 6 – The English parliament adjourns and King Richard II gives royal assent to laws passed during the 31 day session, including an act providing that "All vessels of wine, honey, and oil brought into this realm shall be gauged" and a general pardon of "escapes and felons and clerks convict."

=== Date unknown ===
- Sir William Walworth, a member of the Fishmongers Guild, becomes Lord Mayor of London for the second time.
- Khan Tokhtamysh of the White Horde dethrones Mamai of the Blue Horde. The two hordes unite to form the Golden Horde.
- Karim Al-Makhdum arrives in Jolo, and builds a mosque.
- The Hongwu Emperor purges the chancellor of China, Hu Weiyong, and abolishes that office, as he imposes direct imperial rule over the six ministries of central government, for the Ming Empire.
- The last islands of Polynesia are discovered and inhabited.
- The Companhia das Naus is founded by King Ferdinand I of Portugal.
- The imposter Paul Palaiologos Tagaris, having been appointed Latin Patriarch of Constantinople by Pope Urban VI, takes up residence in his see at Chalcis.

== Births ==
- February 11 – Gian Francesco Poggio Bracciolini, Italian humanist (d. 1459)
- September 8 – Saint Bernardino of Siena, Italian Franciscan missionary (d. 1444)
- November 27 – King Ferdinand I of Aragon (d. 1416)
- date unknown
  - Abd al-Rahman ibn Muhammad al-Bistami, Ottoman Sufi (d. 1455)
  - Giovanni Berardi, Archbishop of Tarentum (d. 1449)
  - Nguyễn Trãi, Confucian scholar (d. 1442)
  - Anne de Bourbon, French noble (d. 1408)
  - Jan Želivský, Hussite priest (d. 1422)
- probable
  - Huitzilihuitl II, 2nd Tlatoani (king) of Tenochtitlan (modern Mexico City), 1396–1417, father of Moctezuma I (d. c. 1417)
  - Jamshīd al-Kāshī, Persian astronomer and mathematician (d. 1429)
  - King Lukeni lua Nimi of the Kingdom of Kongo (d. 1420)
  - Thomas à Kempis, German monk and writer (d. 1471)
  - Parameshvara, Indian mathematician (d. 1425)

== Deaths ==
- April 29 – Saint Catherine of Siena, Italian theologian (b. 1347)
- May 5 – Saint Philotheos, Coptic martyr
- July 13 – Bertrand du Guesclin, Constable of France (b. c. 1320)
- July 26 – Emperor Kōmyō, former Emperor of Japan (b. 1322)
- September 8 – Alexander Peresvet, venerated Russian Orthodox monk and champion of Kulikovo
- September 16 – King Charles V of France (b. 1338)
- December 29 – Elizabeth of Poland, queen consort of Hungary (b. 1305)
- date unknown
  - Haakon VI of Norway (b. 1340)
  - Nissim of Gerona, Catalan rabbi (b. 1320)
  - Khadijah of the Maldives, sovereign sultan of the Maldives
  - Shams al-Dīn Abū Abd Allāh al-Khalīlī, Syrian astronomer (b. 1320)
