= Ali of the Eretnids =

Sultan of the Eretnids from 1366 to 1380

Ala al-Din Ali
- Sultan
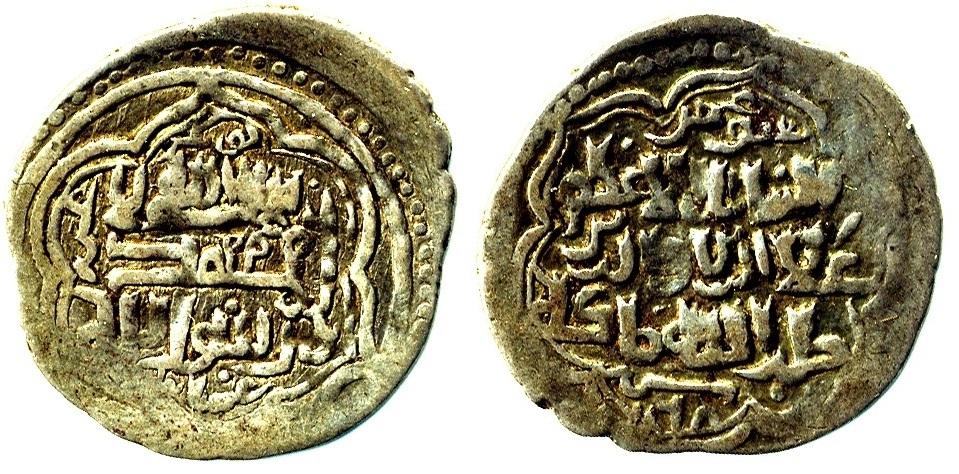
- Silver dirham minted c. 1366–1367 in Hınıs.

Sultan of the Eretnids
- Reign: 1366–1380
- Predecessor: Ghiyath al-Din Muhammad I
- Successor: Muhammad II Chelebi
- Born: January 1353
- Died: August 1380 (aged 27); Kazova
- Burial: Köşkmedrese, Kayseri
- Issue: Muhammad II Chelebi
- House: Eretnids
- Father: Ghiyath al-Din Muhammad I
- Religion: Islam

Ala al-Din Ali (January 1353 – August 1380) was the third Sultan of the Eretnids ruling from 1366 until his death. He inherited the throne at a very early age and was removed from administrative matters. He was characterized as particularly keen on personal pleasures, which later discredited his authority. During his rule, emirs under the Eretnids enjoyed considerable autonomy, and the state continued to shrink as neighboring powers captured several towns. The capital, Kayseri, temporarily came under Karamanid control. Kadi Burhan al-Din rose to power as the new vizier and dispatched Ali to lead several campaigns, most of which were unsuccessful. Ali died of the plague in Kazova in an expedition to subdue Shadgeldi, the emir of Amasya.

== Background ==
Ali's paternal grandfather Eretna was an officer of Uyghur origin initially in the service of Chupan and his son Timurtash. He relocated to Anatolia following the appointment of Timurtash as the local Ilkhanid governor. Upon the dissolution of the Ilkhanate, a successor state of the Mongol Empire, Eretna aligned himself with the Jalayirid ruler Hasan Buzurg, who eventually left Eretna behind to govern when Hasan Buzurg returned east to clash with rival Chobanids and other Mongol lords. In 1343, Eretna declared the independence of his domains as sultan. His reign was largely described as prosperous, and his efforts to maintain order caused him to be known as Köse Peyghamber (lit. 'the beardless prophet'). Eretna died in 1352.

Eretna's son and Ali's father, Ghiyath al-Din Muhammad I, was enthroned at a young age and struggled to maintain his authority over the state his father had founded. Although he was initially preferred over his older brother Jafar, Muhammad was deposed by his emirs early into his reign and was replaced by Jafar. After some time in exile, he returned, restored his rule, and killed his brother. Throughout his reign, he dealt with rebellions and lost land to local Turkoman lords, the Dulkadirids, and the Ottomans. After putting an end to his former vizier Khoja Ali Shah's revolt, he returned to the capital, Kayseri, where his emirs murdered him.

== Life ==
Ali was born in January 1353. He was taught by Abdulmuhsin of Kayseri, a renowned Islamic scholar of that era. He was crowned at 13 years old, following the murder of his father, Ghiyath al-Din Muhammad I. After Muhammad's death, local emirs obtained control of much of the region with the former vizier Khoja Ali Shah's son Hajji Ibrahim in Sivas, Sheikh Najib in Tokat, and Hajji Shadgeldi Pasha in Amasya. The Karamanids invaded Niğde and Aksaray, and local Mongol tribes started disrupting the public order. Ala al-Din Ali was known to solely care for pleasure and lacked the skills to consolidate his authority. He was in love with a Mongol boy and consumed alcohol regularly, which caused him to be largely disregarded in political matters.

In 1375, when Ali was in the midst of a feast in his hammam in Kayseri, Karamanids captured the city with the help of the Mongol tribes of Samargar and Chaykazan, prompting Ali to flee to Sivas or Hafik. The local judge Kadi Burhan al-Din tried to fend off the Karamanids with the hopes that he could claim Kayseri for himself. He wasn't successful, getting arrested when Ali uncovered his true intentions. In addition, the Dulkadirids gained control of Pınarbaşı. The Emir of Sivas, Hajji Ibrahim, who forged an alliance with the leader of Samargar, Hizir Beg, rescued Burhan al-Din and imprisoned Ali instead. Hajji Ibrahim further appointed Hizir Beg as the governor of Kayseri and kept Ali in isolation in Sivas. Although Ali was released for a brief period of time, he was imprisoned again by Hajji Mukbil, who was the mamluk (slave-soldier) of late Hajji Ibrahim. Ali was liberated by Burhan al-Din in 1378. In June of that year, Burhan al-Din was made vizier by the emirs in order to prevent a possible revolt of peasants disgruntled by Ali's incompetence.

Kadi Burhan al-Din later dispatched Ali to lead several military campaigns. One was aimed at subduing Burhan al-Din's rival Hajji Shadgeldi of Amasya, but this proved to be futile and further reinforced Shadgeldi's influence over the region. Another expedition consisted of efforts to reclaim Niğde, which was largely fruitless except for Karahisar's capture. After raiding the Turkomans near Niğde in 1379, Ali took advantage of the death of Pir Husayn Beg, the Emir of Erzincan, and launched a campaign to retake the city, which was also unsuccessful. Ala al-Din Ali died in Kazova in August 1380 from the plague amidst another attempt to crush Shadgeldi. His body was transferred to Tokat and then to Kayseri. He was buried in Köşkmedrese beside his father and grandfather.

== Family ==
Ali's only known son was Muhammad II Chelebi, who was 7 years old when his father died. The state came under the control of a regent because of the heir's youth. Emirs including Shadgeldi and Kadi Burhan al-Din clashed to become the regent, and the latter came out successful. Burhan al-Din initially kept Muhammad II Chelebi beside him at the divan, though in January 1381, he stopped involving Muhammad in such matters altogether. Muhammad's fate is not precisely known. Historians in the 14–15th-century, Ibn Khaldun and Ibn Hajar al-Asqalani, wrote that Kadi Burhan al-Din killed Muhammad.

Khuvand Islamshah Khatun was either the mother or consort of Ali. She appears in records as a noble carrying weight in the Eretnid court, where she ordered a copy of the Ilkhanid work of history Tavarikh-i Jahangusha-yi Ghazani. The possibility that she was Ali's consort is supported by a reference to him as the person of the highest authority, or Shahzada-yi Jahan, along with her, Khuvandegar Khatun, and the remark "may their dominion live on and their majesty be eternal." In Tavarikh-i Jahangusha-yi Ghazani, she was additionally described as "the Bilqis of the age and time," "Banu of Iran-zamin of the time," and "pride of the illustrious family (urugh) of Chingiz Khan."

== Bibliography ==
- Cahen, Claude (2012). "Eretna". In Lewis, B.; Pellat, Ch. & Schacht, J. (eds.). The Encyclopaedia of Islam, Second Edition. Volume II: C–G. Leiden: E. J. Brill. OCLC 495469475.
- Çayırdağ, Mehmet (August 2000). "Eretnalı Beyliğinin Paraları" [Coinage of the Eretna Principality]. Belleten (in Turkish). 64 (240). Turkish Historical Society: 435–452. doi:10.37879/belleten.2000.435. ISSN 2791-6472.
- Göde, Kemal (1995). "Eretnaoğulları". TDV Encyclopedia of Islam, Vol. 11 (Elbi̇stan – Eymi̇r) (in Turkish). Istanbul: Presidency of Religious Affairs, Centre for Islamic Studies. pp. 295–296. ISBN 978-975-389-438-8.
- Melville, Charles (21 April 2010). Suleiman, Yasir; Al-Abdul Jader, Adel (eds.). "Genealogy and Exemplary Rulership in the Tarikh-i Chingiz Khan". Living Islamic History: Studies in Honour of Professor Carole Hillenbrand. Edinburgh: Edinburgh University Press: 129–150. doi:10.3366/edinburgh/9780748637386.003.0009. ISBN 9780748637386. OCLC 712995836.
- Sinclair, T. A. (31 December 1989). Eastern Turkey: An Architectural & Archaeological Survey. Vol. II. Pindar Press. ISBN 978-0-907132-33-2. OCLC 16887803.
- Uzunçarşılı, İsmail Hakkı (20 April 1968). "Sivas - Kayseri ve Dolaylarında Eretna Devleti" [State of Eretna in Sivas - Kayseri and Around]. Belleten (in Turkish). 32 (126). Turkish Historical Association: 161–190. ISSN 2791-6472.
