= Eretnid dynasty =

Sultanate in central and eastern Anatolia (1335–1381)

- 1335–1381
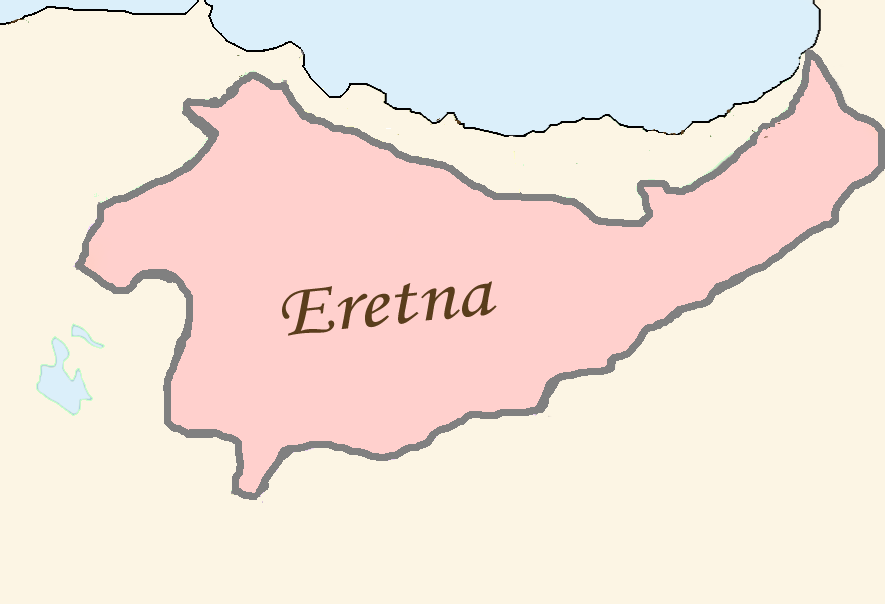
- The Eretnids under Eretna
- Status: Sultanate
- Capital: Sivas and Kayseri
- Religion: Islam
- Government: Monarchy
- Sultan
  - 1335–1352: Ala al-Din Eretna
  - 1380–1381: Muhammad II Chelebi
- History
  - Established: 1335
  - Independence: 1343
  - Disestablished: 1381
Preceded by
Ilkhanate
Succeeded by
Kadi Burhan al-Din
Ottoman Empire
Karamanids
Emirate of Erzincan

The Eretnids (Turkish: Eretna Beyliği) were a dynasty that ruled a state spanning central and eastern Anatolia from 1335 to 1381. The dynasty's founder, Eretna, was an Ilkhanid officer of Uyghur origin, under Timurtash, who was appointed as the governor of Anatolia. Some time after the latter's downfall, Eretna became the governor under the suzerainty of the Jalayirid ruler Hasan Buzurg. After an unexpected victory at the Battle of Karanbük, against Mongol warlords competing to restore the Ilkhanate, Eretna claimed independence declaring himself the sultan of his domains. His reign was largely prosperous earning him the nickname Köse Peygamber (lit. 'the beardless prophet').

Eretna's son Ghiyath al-Din Muhammad I, although initially preferred over his older brother Jafar, struggled to maintain his authority over the state and was quickly deposed by Jafar. Shortly after, he managed to restore his rule, although he could not prevent some portion of his territories from getting annexed by local Turkoman lords, the Dulkadirids to the south, and the Ottomans to the west. In 1365, when he had recently put an end to the revolt of his vizier (chief minister), he was murdered by his emirs (vassals) in Kayseri, the capital.

His 13-year-old son, Ala al-Din Ali, was largely not allowed to interfere in administrative matters by the local emirs, who had been enjoying a substantial degree of autonomy since Eretna's demise. Ali lacked necessary skills of governance and was described to have only cared for personal pleasures. The state's borders continued to shrink, and the capital temporarily came under Karamanid control. Kadi Burhan al-Din rose to power as the new vizier and further dispatched Ali to command several largely unsuccessful campaigns. Ali died of the plague in August 1380 amidst one of those expeditions. The fourth Eretnid sultan, Muhammad II Chelebi was 7 years old when his father died. His regent Burhan al-Din toppled him in less than a year and proclaimed himself as the new sultan by January 1381, ending the Eretnid dynasty's political presence.

There is a scant number of surviving buildings and literary works identified with the rule of the Eretnids. This contrasts with the neighboring contemporary states, who left a greater architectural legacy.

== History ==
=== Background ===
The Ilkhanate emerged in West Asia under Hulagu Khan (r. 1256–1265) as part of the division of the Mongol Empire that started with Möngke Khan's reign (r. 1251–1259). After half a century, the death of the seventh Ilkhan, Ghazan (r. 1295–1304), marked the height of the state, and while his brother Öljaitü was capable of maintaining the empire, his conversion to Shiism sped up the impending fall and civil war in the region.

=== Eretna (1335–1352) ===
Of Uyghur stock, Eretna was born to Jafar or Taiju Bakhshi, a trusted follower of the second Ilkhanid ruler Abaqa Khan (r. 1265–1282), and his wife Tükälti. His name Eretna is popularly explained to have originated from the Sanskrit word ratna (रत्न) meaning 'jewel'. This name was common among the Uyghurs following the spread of Buddhism, and Eretna may have come from Buddhist parentage.

==== Service under the Ilkhanate ====
Eretna migrated to Anatolia following his brothers' execution due to a rebellion they joined and his Chobanid master Timurtash's appointment as the Ilkhanid governor of the region by Ilkhan Abu Sa'id and his father, Chupan. Eretna's master Timurtash eventually rebelled against the Ilkhanate in 1323, during which time Eretna went into hiding. However, the Ilkhan's weak authority and influence over the state of Timurtash's father, Chupan, led to the pardoning of Timurtash and the restoration of his position as the governor of Anatolia. He later led an extensive series of campaigns against the Turkoman emirates in Anatolia. Upon the news of his brother Demasq Kaja's death on 24 August 1327, Timurtash retreated to Kayseri, and following his father's death, he fled to Mamluk Egypt in December while also planning to come into terms with Abu Sa'id. He was later killed on the orders of the Mamluk sultan. Fearing punishment during Timurtash's absence, Eretna took refuge in the court of Badr al-Din Beg of Karaman. Timurtash was replaced by Emir Muhammad from the Oirat tribe, who was the uncle of Abu Sa'id.

==== Viceroy of Anatolia (1335–1343) ====
Eretna was later involved in a plot against the Ilkhan in 1334 but received a pardon and returned to Anatolia from the Ilkhanid court in Iran. With Abu Sa'id's death in 1335, the Ilkhanid period practically came to an end, leaving in its place continuous wars between several warlords from princely houses, namely the Chobanids and Jalayirids. Back west, Eretna came under the suzerainty of the Jalayirid viceroy of Anatolia, Hasan Buzurg, but had already established his supremacy in the region to a considerable degree. Hasan Buzurg left Eretna as his deputy in Anatolia when he departed east to oppose the Oirat chieftain Ali Padishah's attempt to occupy the Ilkhanid throne. Eretna was officially appointed as the governor of Anatolia by Hasan Buzurg following his victory against Ali Padishah. However, shortly after, Hasan Kuchak gained power in the Ilkhanid domains in the east in 1338. Hasan Kuchak was the son of Timurtash and had effectively become the pretender of his father's legacy. He defeated the Jalayirids near Aladağ and pillaged Erzincan.

Due to constant upheavals in the east, Eretna forged an alliance with the Mamluks, who confirmed him as the Mamluk governor of Anatolia. On the contrary, Eretna did very little to uphold Mamluk sovereignty, minting coins on behalf of the new Chobanid puppet Suleiman Khan in 1339. Thus, the Mamluks started viewing the rising Turkoman leader Zayn al-Din Qaraja of Dulkadir more favorably. In 1338–1339, Eretna lost Darende to Qaraja, who was continuing to enlarge his realm at the expanse of Eretna. Having been robbed of the wealth he had stored in the latter city, Eretna confronted the Mamluk sultan, who brought up his failure to declare Mamluk sovereignty. In return, Eretna finally minted coins for the Mamluks in 1339–1340. Despite the loss of Darende, Eretna was able to gain control of Konya from the Karamanids as well as Sivas on an unknown date.

Eretna's attempt to be on good terms with the Chobanids was hindered by Hasan Kuchak's capture of Erzurum and siege of Avnik. He still insisted on his obedience to Suleiman Khan, although by 1341, he had gained enough power to be able to issue his coins in his own name. He first declared his independence in 1341 as it was when he first used the title sultan in his coins. Though, he did not hesitate to send his ambassadors to Cairo to secure Mamluk protection and his status as a na'ib (viceroy) amidst political turmoil within the Mamluks. This elicited a new expedition by Hasan Kuchak in Eretna's lands.

Choosing to stay in Tabriz, Hasan Kuchak dispatched his army to Anatolia under Suleiman Khan's command. The battle took place in the plain of Karanbük (between Sivas and Erzincan) in September–October 1343. Eretna initially faced defeat but was able to flank Suleiman Khan and his guards. The Chobanid army disintegrated when Suleiman Khan fled the scene. Eretna's victory was unexpected for most actors in the region. This victory resulted in the Eretnid annexation of Erzincan and several cities further east, also marking the beginning of Eretna's independent reign. Hasan Kuchak's death at the hands of his wife prevented any retaliation for Eretna's earlier victory.

The locations of towns in Anatolia.

==== Independent reign (1343–1352) ====
After the battle and Hasan Kuchak's death, Eretna assumed the title sultan, dispersed coins in his name, and formally declared sovereignty as part of the khutbah (sermon). He took the laqab (honorific nickname) Ala al-Din, which was attested in his coins and the Maghrebi traveller Ibn Battuta's Rihla. Eretna additionally expanded his borders beyond Erzurum. He faced a reduced number of threats to his rule in this period: Despite the intentions of the new Chobanid ruler Malek Ashraf (r. 1343–57) to wage a war against him, such an expedition never came to be. The political vacuum in Mamluk Egypt, following the death of Sultan Al-Nasir Muhammad (1341; r. 1293–1294, 1299–1309), allowed Eretna to take Darende from the Mamluks. The Dulkadirid ruler Qaraja's focus in pillaging the Armenian Kingdom of Cilicia and tensions with the Mamluk emirs also made an attack from the south unlikely. Eretna further took advantage of the Karamanid ruler Ahmed's death in 1350, capturing Konya. Overall, Eretna's realm extended from Konya to Ankara and Erzurum, also incorporating Kayseri, Amasya, Tokat, Çorum, Develi, Karahisar, Zile, Canik, Ürgüp, Niğde, Aksaray, Erzincan, Şebinkarahisar, and Darende, with the capital initially situated in Sivas and later Kayseri.

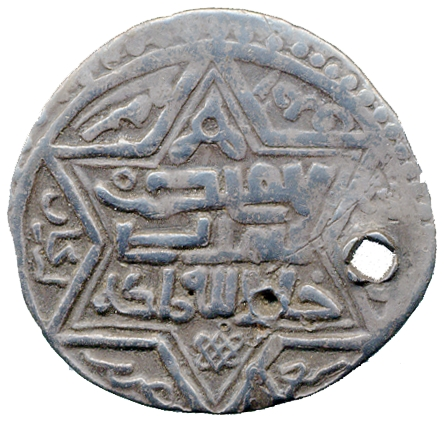
Silver dirham minted in the name of Eretna in 1351 in Erzincan. It includes an inscription in the Uyghur script that reads sultan adil.

Eretna benefited from the support of the significant population of Mongol tribes in Central Anatolia (referred to as Qara Tatars in sources) in asserting his rule. He thus highlighted his succession to the Mongol tradition despite his Uyghur origin. When he stopped referring to an overlord after 1341–2 and issued his own coins, he utilized the Uyghur script, which was also used for Mongolian, to underline the Mongol heritage he sought to represent. Eretna's identification with the Mongol tradition and hesitancy to enact Mamluk sovereignty is in parallel with the overall character of other local rulers, who responded to the downfall of traditional concepts of legitimacy by practicing substantially different means to justify their rule. Still, instead of the Mongols, who were numerous in the region from Kütahya to Sivas, Eretna appointed mamluks (slave-soldiers) and local Turks in administrative positions fearing the rebirth of the Mongol rule.

Eretna was a fluent Arabic-speaker according to Ibn Battuta and was considered a scholar among the scholars of his era. He was famously known as Köse Peyghamber (lit. 'the beardless prophet') by his subjects who looked upon him favorably because his rule preserved order in a region that was politically crumbling apart. He promoted and reinforced the sharia law in his domains and showed an effort to respect and sustain the ulama, sayyids, and sheikhs (Islamic dignitaries). An exception to the praise he received was al-Maqrizi's accusation that he allowed the state to later fall apart. Eretna died in February, March, or August 1352 and was buried in the kumbet (dome) located in the courtyard of Köşkmedrese in Kayseri.

=== Muhammad I (1352–1365) ===
Muhammad was liked by most Eretnid emirs (regional feudal lords), and upon his father's death, Eretna's vizier (chief minister), Khoja Ali Shah, secretly invited Muhammad to Kayseri to become the new sultan, although Muhammad's older brother Jafar was already residing there. Jafar was imprisoned by Muhammad for some time, but he eventually escaped to Egypt. However, Muhammad's rule did not fare well due to his debaucherous behaviour and unfair treatment of his siblings. Since he was young, authority came into the hands of his emirs. Turkoman tribes took control of the northern region of Canik near the Black Sea coast. Although the Dulkadirids to the south expanded their borders at the expense of the Eretnids, the Dulkadirid beg Zayn al-Din Qaraja would soon seek protection in Muhammad's court fleeing from the Mamluks, who were preparing to prosecute him for the rebellion he led. On 22 September 1353, Muhammad deported Qaraja to Mamluk-controlled Aleppo in exchange for a payment of 500 thousand dinars by the Mamluks, who would later transport Qaraja to Cairo for his execution. This did not affect the fate of Muhammad, as he was deposed by his emirs in 1354, and his half-brother Jafar reigned for a year (until 1355).

After losing the throne to his half-brother, Muhammad fled to Konya, which had been regained by the Karamanids, and later moved north to Sivas. The governor of Sivas, Ibn Kurd, recognized him and assisted him in the restoration of his rule. In April 1355, Muhammad faced Jafar at the Battle of Yalnızgöz. Muhammad came to terms with the vizier Ali Khoja and killed Jafar, reclaiming his rule. In 1361, as a reprisal to a raid by Tatars of the Chavdar tribe, Ottoman ruler Murad I captured Ankara Castle from the Eretnids. Muhammad allied himself with the Dulkadirids in September 1362 in a joint campaign successfully driving the Mamluks from Malatya. The Mamluk governor of Damascus, Yalbugha, and his 24 thousand-strong force marched north and raided Eretnid and Dulkadirid lands. However, this effort failed to regain Mamluk control.

According to historian Kemal Göde, Muhammad reversed into conflict with Khoja Ali Shah, whom he killed near Zamantu on 30 May 1358. This deviates from İsmail Hakkı Uzunçarşılı's earlier work which explains that Khoja Ali Shah led an uprising against Muhammad in 1364 and marched towards Kayseri. Muhammad was defeated and had to request assistance from the Mamluk Sultan Al-Kamil Sha'ban. Upon a decree by the Mamluk Sultan, the governor of Aleppo sent his forces to aid Muhammad, with which he subdued and executed Khoja Ali Shah in 1365.

Soon after in October 1365, other emirs who wanted to preserve their autonomy, such as Hajji Shadgeldi and Hajji Ibrahim, killed Muhammad in Kayseri before he could reinforce his authority, enthroning his son Ali. Around that time, the eastern part of the realm, including Erzincan, Erzurum, and Bayburt, had come under the rule of a local figure, Ahi Ayna.

=== Ali (1365–1380) ===
Ala al-Din Ali was crowned at 13 years old, following the murder of his father. Ali was particularly known to have solely cared for pleasure and lacked the skills to consolidate his authority. He was largely disregarded in political matters. After Muhammad's death, local emirs obtained control of much of the region with the former vizier Khoja Ali Shah's son Hajji Ibrahim in Sivas, Sheikh Najib in Tokat, and Hajji Shadgeldi Pasha in Amasya. The Karamanids invaded Niğde and Aksaray, and local Mongol tribes started disrupting the public order.

In 1375, when Ali was in the midst of a feast in his hammam in Kayseri, the Karamanids captured the city with the help of the Mongol tribes of Samargar and Chaykazan, prompting Ali to flee to Sivas. The local judge Kadi Burhan al-Din tried to fend off the Karamanids, in hopes that he could claim Kayseri for himself. He wasn't successful, getting arrested when Ali uncovered his true intentions. In addition, the Dulkadirids gained control of Pınarbaşı. The Emir of Sivas, Hajji Ibrahim, who allied with the leader of Samargar, Hizir Beg, rescued Burhan al-Din and imprisoned Ali instead. Hajji Ibrahim further appointed Hizir Beg as the governor of Kayseri and kept Ali in isolation in Sivas. Although Ali was released for a brief period of time, he was imprisoned once again by Hajji Mukbil, who was the mamluk of the recently deceased Hajji Ibrahim. Ali was liberated by Burhan al-Din in 1378. In June of that year, Burhan al-Din was made vizier by the emirs to prevent a possible revolt of peasants disgruntled by Ali's incompetence.

Kadi Burhan al-Din later dispatched Ali to lead several campaigns. One was aimed at subduing Burhan al-Din's rival Hajji Shadgeldi of Amasya, but this proved to be futile and further reinforced Shadgeldi's influence over the region. Another expedition consisted of efforts to reclaim Niğde, which was largely fruitless except for Karahisar's capture. After raiding the Turkomans near Niğde in 1379, Ali took advantage of the death of Pir Husayn Beg, Emir of Erzincan, through a campaign to retake the city, which was also unsuccessful. Ala al-Din Ali died in Kazova in August 1380 from the plague amidst another attempt to crush Shadgeldi. His body was transferred to Tokat and then to Kayseri. He was buried in Köşkmedrese beside his father and grandfather.

=== Muhammad II Chelebi and usurpation by Kadi Burhan al-Din ===
Muhammad II Chelebi was crowned when he was 7 years old. His regent was Kadi Burhan al-Din, who proclaimed himself as the ruler by January 1381. According to Ibn Khaldun and Ibn Hajar al-Asqalani, Muhammad was killed by Kadi Burhan al-Din in 1390.

== Culture ==
=== Architecture ===
There are no surviving mosques, madrasas, caravanserais, hospitals, or bridges dated back to Eretna's rule, except for tombs. Similarly, the overall Eretnid period in Anatolia was unproductive in terms of architectural legacy. This contrasts with the large legacy produced by the Turkoman contemporaries of the Eretnids, who ruled comparably smaller realms. Köşkmedrese is a khanqah that was used as the burial place of the Eretnid sultans and consorts. According to the now-vanished inscriptions on the building, it was built by Eretna in memory of his consort Suli Pasha in 1339. The name Kaluyan, possibly that of an Armenian architect, appears on the building. Güdük Minaret, also known as the Dabbas Tekke and located in the center of the city of Sivas, was built during Eretna's reign as a burial place for his son Sheikh Hasan, who died in 1347.

=== Literature ===
There is a scant number of surviving literary works that were dedicated to the Eretnids. One such text was a short Persian tafsir (exegesis) in al-As'ila wa'l-Ajwiba by Aqsara'i commissioned by the Eretnid emir of Amasya, Sayf al-Din Shadgeldi (died 1381). Another instance was an astrological almanac (taqwim) created for the last Eretnid ruler Ala al-Din Ali in 1371–2.

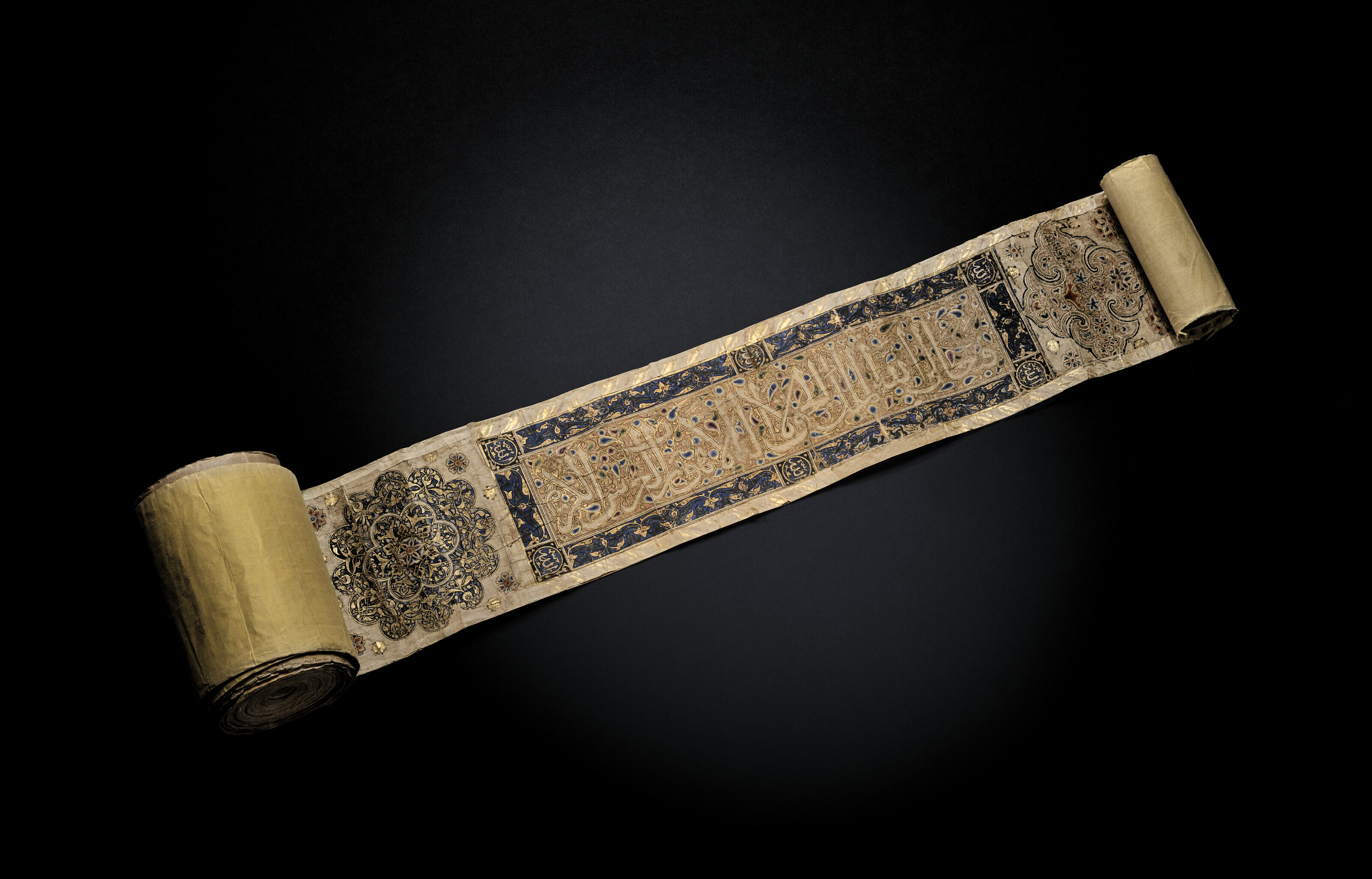
A Quran scroll commissioned for Ghiyath al-Din Muhammad I, circa 1353–54

== Coinage ==
During the Ilkhanid era, Eretna struck coins in the name of Abu Sa'id until he died in 1335. Eretna issued coins for various pretenders to the Ilkhanid throne. Briefly in 1338–9, Eretna minted one type of coin for Taghaytimur, although he ruled in Khorasan, far from Anatolia, and was not a direct descendant of Genghis Khan. According to Philip N. Remler, this signified Anatolia's gradual transition into independence from the states in the east but continued trade along the Silk Road. Coins Eretna minted in the name of the Chobanid-backed pretender Suleiman Khan forms a continuity with Eretna's coins as an independent sultan. The coinage of Eretna's son Muhammad and grandson Ali were derived from the Mongol tradition. Ghiyath al-Din Muhammad's coinage was more innovative, and his son's largely used older motifs.

== Family tree ==
Eretna's parents were Jafar or Taiju Bakhshi and his wife Tükälti. Eretna's elder brothers were Emir Taramtaz and Suniktaz. There were possibly two additional brothers of Eretna. Emir of Erzincan, Mutahharten was Eretna's nephew among others. Eretna had a sister who married the Chobanid prince Timurtash. According to the work of history commissioned by the Karamanids, Karamanname, Eretna had a paternal uncle named Ali.

Eretna's wives included Suli Pasha (died 1339), Togha Khatun (Note: Ibn Battuta wrote about having met her in Kayseri.) and Isfahan Shah Khatun. He was known to have had three sons: Hasan, Muhammad, and Jafar. The oldest son, Sheikh Hasan was the governor of Sivas and died in December 1347 or January 1348 due to sickness shortly after he wed an Artuqid princess. Eretna's successor and youngest son, Ghiyath al-Din Muhammad I was born to Isfahan Shah Khatun, who was a relative of the Jalayirid ruler Hasan Buzurg.

Muhammad's son Ala al-Din Ali succeeded him after his murder. According to Karamanname, Muhammad also had an older son named Eretna. He was at some point declared as the ruler but was defeated and imprisoned by the Karamanids. While he held the throne for some time, he was eventually killed by Ala al-Din of Karaman. Muhammad's son Eretna had two sons named Esenbogha and Ghazi, the first of which is reputed to have a tomb in Niğde. However, details on his life are not mentioned by any sources of that era other than Karamanname.

Ali's only known son was Muhammad II Chelebi. Khuvand Islamshah Khatun was either the mother or consort of Ali. She appears in records as a noble carrying weight in the Eretnid court, where she ordered a copy of the Ilkhanid Tavarikh-i Jahangusha-yi Ghazani. The possibility that she was Ali's consort is supported by a reference to him as the person of the highest authority, or Shahzada-yi Jahan, along with her, Khuvandegar Khatun, and the remark "may their dominion live on and their majesty be eternal." There, she was described as "the Bilqis of the age and time," "Banu of Iran-zamin of the time," and "pride of the illustrious family (urugh) of Chingiz Khan."

Muhammad is reputed to have had 2 sons, Yusuf Chelebi (died 1434) and Ahmad (d. 1433), and 3 daughters, Neslikhan Khatun (d. 1455), Aisha (d. 1436), and Fatima (d. 1430). Ahmad had a son named Muhammad (d. 1443) and grandson Ahmad, who was attested to be living in 1477.

The family tree of the Eretnid dynasty

Tükälti	Taiju Bakhshi or Jafar
Son	Timurtash	Daughter	Togha Khatun, Suli Pasha, Isfahan Shah Khatun	Ala al-Din Eretna	Taramtaz	Suniktaz	Son
Feridun	An Artuqid princess	Badr al-Din Sheikh Hasan	Izz al-Din; Jafar	Ghiyath al-Din; Muhammad I	Pir Muhammad	Daughter	Mutahharten	Das. of Alexios III and Ahmad Beg
Eretna	Islamshah Khatun	Ala al-Din Ali	Shah Ali	Daughter
Esenbogha	Ghazi	Muhammad II Chelebi	Yar Ali
Yusuf Chelebi	Ahmad	Neslikhan	Aisha	Fatima
Muhammad
Ahmad

Legend: Eretnid sultans Emirs of Erzincan

== Bibliography ==
- Alıç, Samet (2020). "Memlûkler Tarafından Katledilen Dulkadir Emirleri" [The Dulkadir Emirs Killed by the Mamluks]. The Journal of Selcuk University Social Sciences Institute (in Turkish) (43): 83–94. ISSN 2667-4750.
- Bosworth, Clifford Edmund (1996). New Islamic Dynasties: A Chronological and Genealogical Manual. Edinburgh University Press. ISBN 978-0-231-10714-3. OCLC 35029627.
- Cahen, Claude (1965). "Eretna". In Lewis, B.; Pellat, Ch. & Schacht, J. (eds.). The Encyclopaedia of Islam, Second Edition. Volume II: C–G. Leiden: E. J. Brill. OCLC 495469475.
- Çayırdağ, Mehmet (August 2000). "Eretnalı Beyliğinin Paraları" [Coinage of the Eretna Principality]. Belleten (in Turkish). 64 (240). Turkish Historical Society: 435–452. doi:10.37879/belleten.2000.435. ISSN 2791-6472.
- Durukan, Aynur (2002). "Köşkmedrese". TDV Encyclopedia of Islam, Vol. 26 (Ki̇li̇ – Kütahya) (in Turkish). Istanbul: Presidency of Religious Affairs, Centre for Islamic Studies. pp. 282–283. ISBN 978-975-389-406-7.
- Ertuğrul, Özkan (1996). "Güdük Minare". TDV Encyclopedia of Islam, Vol. 14 (Geli̇bolu – Haddesenâ) (in Turkish). Istanbul: Presidency of Religious Affairs, Centre for Islamic Studies. pp. 214–215. ISBN 978-975-389-441-8.
- Göde, Kemal (1994). Eratnalılar, 1327-1381. Turkish Historical Society Press. ISBN 975-16-0612-8. OCLC 31737254.
- Göde, Kemal (1995). "Eretnaoğulları". TDV Encyclopedia of Islam, Vol. 11 (Elbi̇stan – Eymi̇r) (in Turkish). Istanbul: Presidency of Religious Affairs, Centre for Islamic Studies. pp. 295–296. ISBN 978-975-389-438-8.
- Jackson, Cailah (4 September 2020). Islamic Manuscripts of Late Medieval Rum, 1270s-1370s Production, Patronage and the Arts of the Book. Edinburgh University Press. ISBN 978-1-4744-5151-2. OCLC 1202462227.
- Masters, Bruce Alan; Ágoston, Gábor (2010). Encyclopedia of the Ottoman Empire. Infobase. ISBN 978-1-4381-1025-7. OCLC 227205977.
- Melville, Charles (12 March 2009). "Anatolia under the Mongols". In Fleet, Kate (ed.). The Cambridge History of Turkey (1 ed.). Cambridge University Press. pp. 51–101. doi:10.1017/chol9780521620932.004. ISBN 978-1-139-05596-3.
- Melville, Charles (21 April 2010). "Genealogy and Exemplary Rulership in the Tarikh-i Chingiz Khan⋆". In Suleiman, Yasir; Al-Abdul Jader, Adel (eds.). Genealogy and Exemplary Rulership in the Tarikh-i Chingiz Khan. Edinburgh: Edinburgh University Press. pp. 129–150. doi:10.3366/edinburgh/9780748637386.003.0009. ISBN 978-0-7486-3738-6. OCLC 712995836.
- Nicolle, David (2008). The Ottomans: Empire of Faith. Thalamus. ISBN 978-1-902886-11-4. OCLC 455106992.
- Peacock, Andrew Charles Spencer (17 October 2019). Islam, Literature and Society in Mongol Anatolia. Cambridge University Press. doi:10.1017/9781108582124. ISBN 978-1-108-49936-1. OCLC 1124923987.
- Remler, Philip N. (1980). "Ottoman, Isfendiyarid, and Eretnid Coinage: A Currency Community in Fourteenth Century Anatolia". Museum Notes (American Numismatic Society). 25: 167–188. ISSN 0145-1413. JSTOR 43573603.
- Sinclair, T. A. [at Wikidata] (31 December 1989). Eastern Turkey: An Architectural & Archaeological Survey. Vol. II. Pindar Press. ISBN 978-0-907132-33-2. OCLC 16887803.
- Sinclair, Thomas (6 December 2019). Eastern Trade and the Mediterranean in the Middle Ages: Pegolotti's Ayas-Tabriz Itinerary and Its Commercial Context. Taylor & Francis. ISBN 978-1-000-75267-0. OCLC 1119073048.
- Spuler, Bertold [in German] & Ettinghausen, Richard (1971). "Īlk̲h̲āns". In Lewis, B.; Ménage, V. L.; Pellat, Ch. & Schacht, J. (eds.). The Encyclopaedia of Islam, Second Edition. Volume III: H–Iram. Leiden: E. J. Brill. OCLC 495469525.
- Sümer, Faruk (1969). "Anadolu'da Moğollar" [Mongols in Anatolia] (PDF). Journal of Seljuk Studies (in Turkish). Ankara: Institute of Seljuk History and Civilization (published 1970). ISBN 978-975-17-5360-1.
- Uzunçarşılı, İsmail Hakkı (20 April 1968). "Sivas - Kayseri ve Dolaylarında Eretna Devleti" [State of Eretna in Sivas - Kayseri and Around]. Belleten (in Turkish). 32 (126). Turkish Historical Association: 161–190. ISSN 2791-6472.
- von Zambaur, Eduard Karl Max [in German] (1927). Manuel de généalogie et de chronologie pour l'histoire de l'Islam avec 20 tableaux généalogiques hors texte et 5 cartes [Handbook of genealogy and chronology for the history of Islam: with 20 additional genealogical tables and 5 maps] (in French). H. Lafaire. OCLC 1417299000.
