= Khoja Ali Shah =

Vizier of the Eretnids (died 1358)

Vizier to the Eretnids
- In office By 1353 – Before 1358

Personal details
- Died: 30 May 1358

Khoja Ali Shah (died 30 May 1358) was the Eretnid vizier by 1353 until his revolt against the ruler Ghiyath al-Din Muhammad I (r. 1353–66). He served Eretna (r. 1335–53) as his vizier, and upon his death, Khoja Ali secretly invited Muhammad to Kayseri to become the new sultan, although Muhammad's older brother Jafar was already residing there. Jafar was imprisoned by Muhammad for some time, but he eventually escaped to Egypt. Muhammad's rule did not fare well, and he was ousted from the throne in 1354.

In April 1355, Muhammad faced Jafar at the Battle of Yalnızgöz. He came to terms with Khoja Ali Shah. According to historian Kemal Göde, Muhammad later reversed into conflict with Khoja Ali Shah, whom he killed near Zamantu on 30 May 1358. This deviates from İsmail Hakkı Uzunçarşılı's earlier work which explains that Khoja Ali Shah led an uprising against Muhammad in 1364 and marched towards Kayseri. Muhammad was defeated and had to request assistance from the Mamluk Sultan Al-Kamil Sha'ban. Upon a decree by the Mamluk Sultan, the governor of Aleppo sent his forces to aid Muhammad, with which he subdued and executed Khoja Ali Shah in 1365.

== Bibliography ==
- Çayırdağ, Mehmet (August 2000). "Eretnalı Beyliğinin Paraları" [Coinage of the Eretna Principality]. Belleten (in Turkish). 64 (240). Turkish Historical Society: 435–452. doi:10.37879/belleten.2000.435. ISSN 2791-6472.
- Göde, Kemal (1994). Eratnalılar, 1327-1381. Turkish Historical Society Press. ISBN 9751606128. OCLC 31737254.
- Göde, Kemal (1995). "Eretnaoğulları". TDV Encyclopedia of Islam, Vol. 11 (Elbi̇stan – Eymi̇r) (in Turkish). Istanbul: Turkiye Diyanet Foundation, Centre for Islamic Studies. pp. 295–296. ISBN 978-975-389-438-8.
- Uzunçarşılı, İsmail Hakkı (20 April 1968). "Sivas - Kayseri ve Dolaylarında Eretna Devleti" [State of Eretna in Sivas - Kayseri and Around]. Belleten (in Turkish). 32 (126). Turkish Historical Association: 161–190. ISSN 2791-6472.
