= Rûm Eyalet =

1398–1864 Ottoman province in northern Anatolia

Eyâlet-i Rûmiyye-i Suğra / Eyâlet-i Sivas
- Eyalet of the Ottoman Empire
- 1398–1864
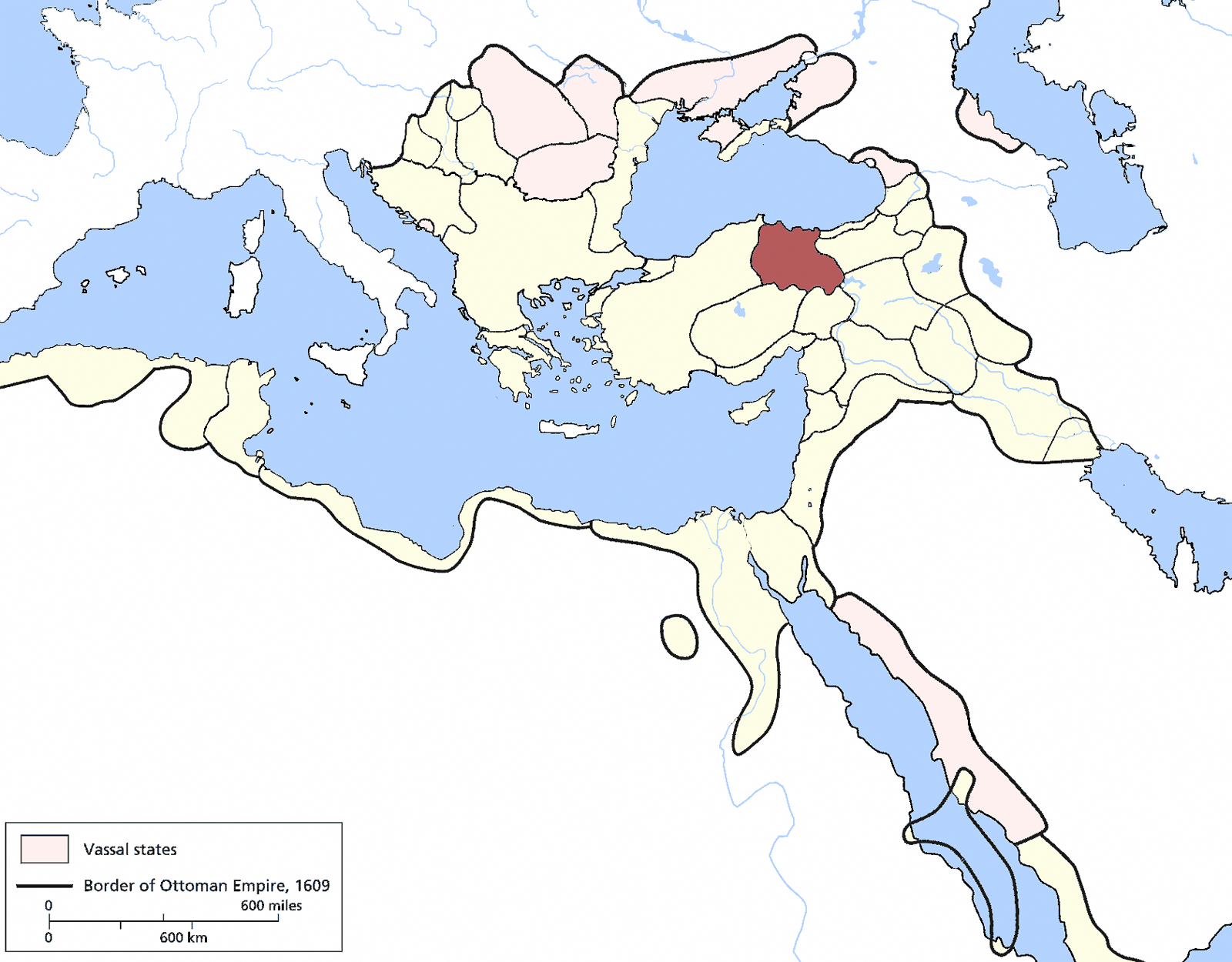
- The Eyalet of Sivas in 1609
- Capital: Tokat, Amasya, Sivas
- History
  - Established: 1398
  - Disestablished: 1864
Preceded by	Succeeded by
Kadi Burhan al-Din	Sivas Vilayet
- Today part of: Turkey

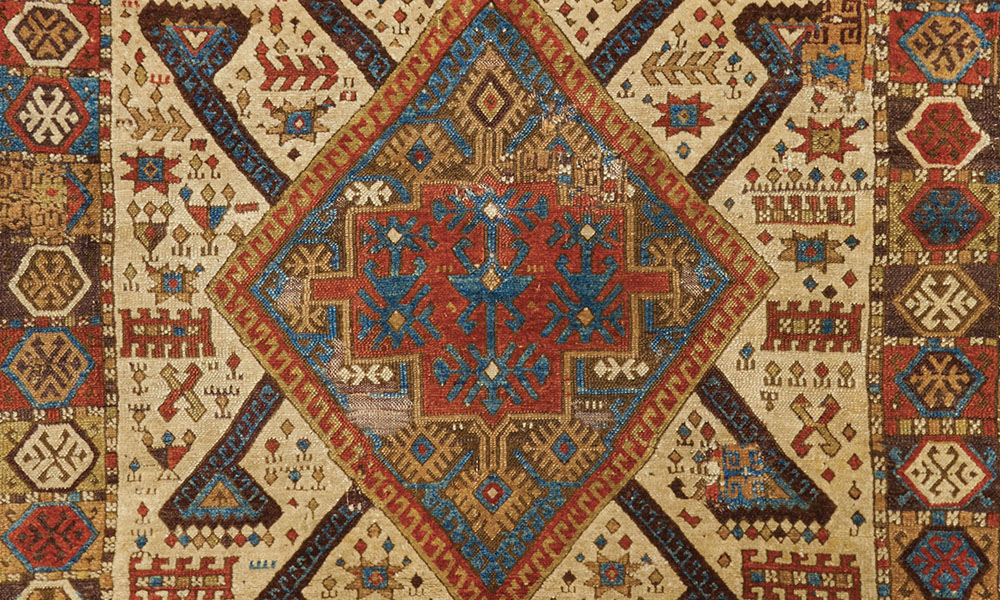
East Anatolian rug (detail), from the Şarkişla-Sivas region. Made c. 1800.

The Eyalet of Rûm (Ottoman Turkish: ایالت روم; Eyālet-i Rūm; originally Arabic for Eastern Roman Empire), later named as the Eyalet of Sivas (Ottoman Turkish: ایالت سیواس; Eyālet-i Sīvās), was an eyalet of the Ottoman Empire in northern Anatolia, founded following Bayezid I's conquest of the area in the 1390s. The capital was the city of Tokat, which was then moved to Amasya and later to Sivas. Its reported area in the 19th century was 28,912 square miles (74,880 km^{2}).

Rûm was the old Seljuk Turkish designation for Anatolia, referring to the Eastern Roman Empire, and in European texts as late as the 19th century the word Rûm (or Roum) was used to denote the whole of central Anatolia, not just the smaller area comprising the Ottoman province (see Sultanate of Rum).

== History ==
In the 14th century several autonomous towns (Amasya, Tokat, Sivas) were established, despite the continued Seljukid-Mongol rule in central Asia Minor.

When the Ilkhanid ruler Ebu Said died in 1335, administration of Asia Minor was entrusted to his former governor Eretna Bey, a Uyghur. Eretna Bey ultimately declared independence, seeking the protection of the Mamluks, who were rivals of the Ilkhanids. He captured the area around Sivas-Kayseri, eventually establishing an emirate of Eretna, which grew stronger during the rule of his son, Mehmed Bey.

In 1381 Kadı Burhaneddin a kadı in Kayseri who was also appointed vizier to represent the emirate of Eretna in that town, replaced the Eretnid as ruler of Sivas and also captured Amasya and Tokat. His principality managed to resist interference in central Anatolia from both the Akkoyunlus and the Ottomans until it collapsed with his death in 1398.

== Administrative divisions ==
According to Evliya Çelebi, the eyalet of Sivas had the following sanjaks in the 17th century:

1. Sivas Sanjak (Sívás, Sivas)
2. Divriği Sanjak (Deverbegi, Divriği)
3. Çorum Sanjak (Khúrúm, Çorum)
4. Keskin Sanjak (Keskín, Keskin)
5. Bozok Sanjak (Buzúk, Yozgat)
6. Amasya Sanjak (Amasia, Amasya)
7. Tokat Sanjak (Tokát, Tokat)
8. Zile Sanjak (Zíla, Zile)
9. Canik Sanjak (Janík, Samsun)
10. Arabgir Sanjak (Arab-gír, Arapgir)

The eyalet of Sivas consisted of seven sanjaks between 1700 and 1740:

1. Sanjak of Sivas (Paşa Sancağı, Sivas)
2. Sanjak of Amasya (Amasya)
3. Sanjak of Janik (Canik Sancağı, Samsun)
4. Sanjak of Diwriji (Divriği Sancağı, Divriği)
5. Sanjak of Arabgir (Arabgir Sancağı, Arapgir)
6. Sanjak of Chorum (Çorum Sancağı, Çorum)
7. Sanjak of Bozok (Bozok Sancağı, Yozgat)
8. Sanjak of Zile (Zile Sancağı, Zile)
