= Güdük Minaret =

14th-century tomb in Sivas, Turkey

Coordinates: 39°45′05″N 37°01′21″E

Güdük Minare, also known as the Şeyh Hasan Bey Tomb and Dabas Tekkesi, is a 14th-century türbe in Sivas, Turkey. It belongs to the Eretnid period and was built by Ala al-Din Eretna in 1347 for his son Şeyh Hasan Bey. The structure is called Güdük Minare because its form resembles a short or ruined minaret, although it is actually a tomb. It consists of a cut-stone cubic lower section and a cylindrical brick upper section covered by a conical roof. Its brick body is decorated with turquoise glazed brick and tile elements.

== Bibliography ==
- Uzunçarşılı, İsmail Hakkı; Edgüer, Rıdvan Nâfiz (1928). Anadolu Türk Tarihi Tedkikatından Sivas Şehri (in Turkish). İstanbul. pp. 151–152.
- Uzunçarşılı, İsmail Hakkı (1968). "Sivas - Kayseri ve Dolaylarında Eretna Devleti". Belleten (in Turkish). 32 (126): 176.
- Gabriel, Albert (1934). Monuments turcs d'Anatolie (in French). Vol. II: Amasya–Tokat et Sivas. Paris: E. de Boccard. pp. 162–164, plate XXXIV.
- Yetkin, Şerare (1972). Anadolu'da Türk Çini Sanatının Gelişmesi (in Turkish). İstanbul. p. 140.
