= İstasyon Bridge =

İstasyon Bridge İstasyon Köprüsü
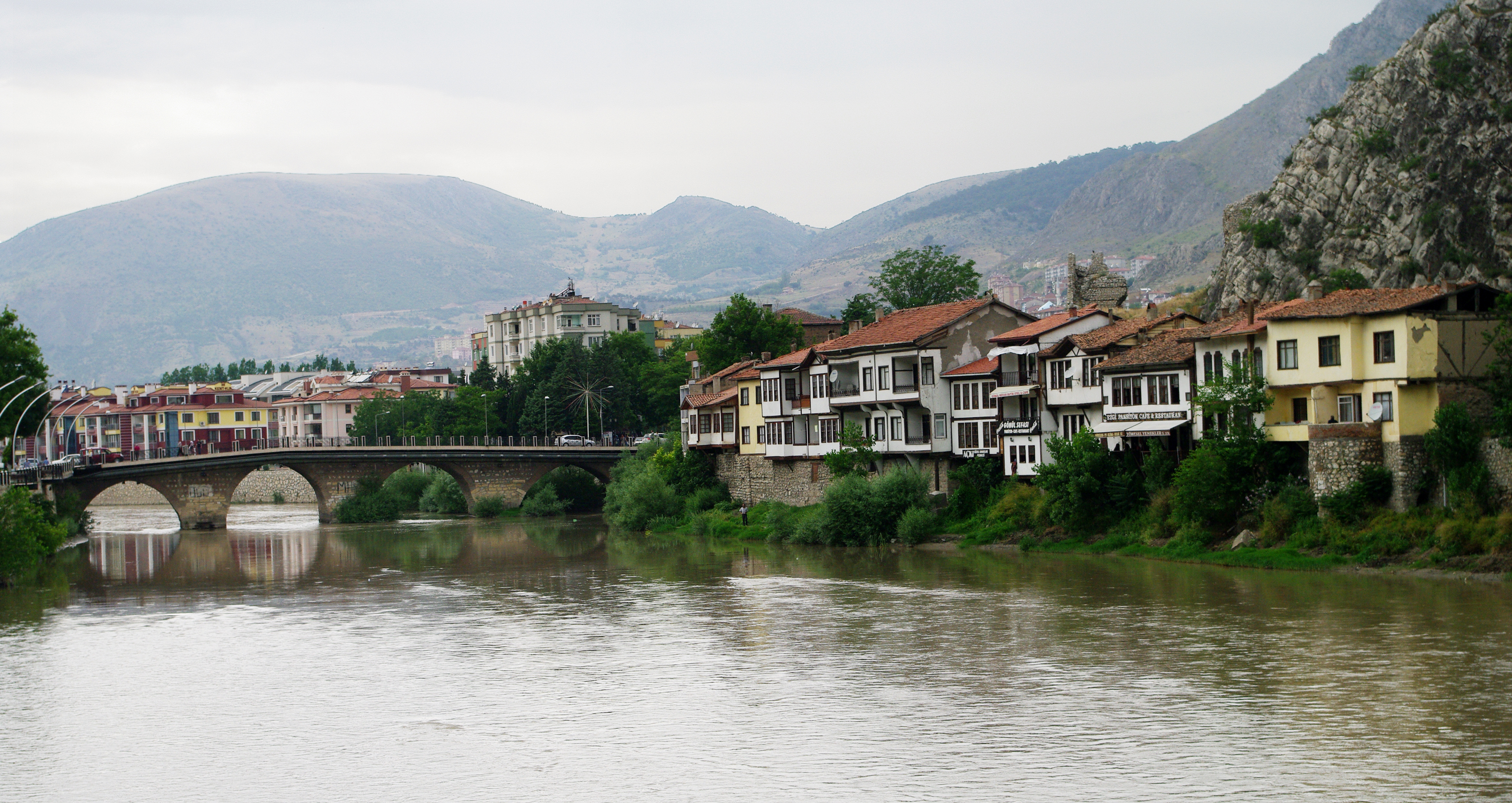
- İstasyon Bridge in Amasya, Turkey
- Coordinates: 40.6522°N 35.8230°E
- Crosses: Yeşilırmak
- Locale: Amasya, Turkey
- Other name: "Meydan Bridge"

Characteristics
- Design: Arch bridge
- Material: Stone

History
- Construction end: 14th century

Location
- Interactive map of İstasyon Bridge

İstasyon Bridge (Turkish: İstasyon Köprüsü, literally "Station Bridge") is a historical bridge in Amasya, Turkey. Formerly it was also called Meydan Bridge.

The bridge is over Yeşilırmak River at 40°39′08″N 35°49′23″E. It is direction is from north to south.

The bridge was constructed by Sadgeldi, the governor of Amasya between 1360 and 1382 who soon declared independence from the Eretnids. During the Ottoman Empire era the bridge was damaged in the 1824 flood and in 1825 earthquake. It was repaired in 1828 by Hacı Yusuf, the ayan of Amasya (governor). During the Turkish Republic, it underwent maintenance in 1940. It is a four-arch bridge. According to Fügen İlter, the bridge although constructed in 14th century, is quite different from the other bridges built in the post-Seljukid era.
