= Seyrani =

Turkish poet (1800)

Seyrani (Turkish: Âşık Seyrani; 1800–1866) was a Turkish folk poet.

== Biography ==
The date of birth of Seyrani from Develi (Everek) is not certain. There are records that he was born in 1800 or 1807. He was born in Develi, known as Everek in those years, which is the district of Kayseri province today. His real name is Mehmet.

Before Seyrânî went to Istanbul, he got married and had children from this marriage: Seyfullah, Nasrullah, Emine, Fatma, Zeliha, and Havva. Some of Seyrânî's descendants still reside in Develi and some in Niğde.

== Bibliography ==
Seyrani, who goes to Istanbul, meets and gets to know the saz and pen poets of the time. Seyrani completes his madrasah education, which was left unfinished while he was in Istanbul. He defined these days with these words:

"Yedi yıl eğlendi, kaldı Seyrani

Bütün tahsil etti ilmi irfanı

Sendeyken her türlü mürüvvet kanı

Bulmadın derdime çare İstanbul"

However, Seyrani is a poet who, due to his character, could not ignore the mistakes he saw around him, even if it was the Sultan who made these mistakes, and he satirized these situations heavily in his poems. Therefore, an investigation was launched against him and he had to flee to Develi with the help of a friend from Develi in order not to be caught.

== Legacy ==
A sculpture of Seyrani by the sculptor Gürdal Duyar was erected in Develi, Kayseri on 4 April 1976. It became a symbol of the town.
