= Ghiyath al-Din Muhammad (disambiguation) =

Ghiyath al-Din Muhammad (1140–1203) was the Sultan of the Ghurids from 1163 to 1203.

Ghiyath al-Din Muhammad may also refer to:

- Ghiyath al-Din Muhammad I (died 1365), Sultan of the Eretnids
- Ghiyath al-Din Muhammad (vizier) (died 1336), Ilkhanid bureaucrat
- Ghiyath al-Din Muhammad (1475/6 – 1535/6), commonly known as Khvandamir, Persian historian
- Ghiyath al-Din Muhammad I Tapar (1082–1118), Sultan of the Seljuk Empire
