= Tarık Galip Somer =

Turkish academic

- Born: 1926; Develi, Kayseri, Turkey
- Died: 1997 (aged 70–71)
- Education: Rensselaer Polytechnic Institute (BS); Massachusetts Institute of Technology (MS); University of Maryland (PhD)
- Known for: President of Ankara University; President of Middle East Technical University
- Spouse: Güler Somer
- Children: Deniz Somer
- Scientific career
- Fields: Chemical engineer
- Workplaces: Middle East Technical University; Ankara University; TU Darmstadt

Tarık Galip Somer (1926–1997) was a Turkish academic.

== Early life ==
He was born in 1926 in the Develi, Kayseri. His father was Mehmet, and his mother was Elmas. He earned a Bachelor of Science degree from Rensselaer Polytechnic Institute in the United States, followed by a Master of Science degree from the Massachusetts Institute of Technology and a PhD from the University of Maryland. After completing his education, he worked as a research engineer at Dupont Co. from 1954 to 1956.

== Academic life ==
After returning to Turkey, he joined the Middle East Technical University (METU) in Ankara. From 1958 to 1970, he served as the founding dean of the Chemical Engineering Department at METU. Between 1973 and 1974, he held the position of vice rector at METU, and from 1974 to 1976, he served as the rector of the university. During the 1976–1977 academic year, he was a visiting professor at Technical University of Darmstadt, Germany. From 1982 to 1987, he served as the rector of Ankara University.

== Other posts ==
In 1966 he served in the research and development commission of the Ministry of Defense. Between 1980 and 1982, he was the technical adviser in UNESCO. During his service term in UNESCO, he contributed to the establishment of the university system in Uganda. Between 1984 and 1985 he was the chairmen of Turkish Universities High Council.

In 1966, he served on the Research and Development Commission of the Ministry of National Defense. From 1980 to 1982, he worked as a technical adviser for UNESCO, where he contributed to the development of the university system in Uganda. Between 1984 and 1985, he served as the chairman of the Turkish Universities High Council. He died in 1997.

== Legacy ==
At METU, the Tarık Somer Academic Success Award is presented to outstanding academics in the field of chemical engineering.
