= Tarih Dünyası =

History and political magazine in Turkey (1950–1965)

- Categories: History magazine; Political magazine
- Frequency: Biweekly; Monthly
- Founded: 1950
- First issue: 15 April 1950
- Final issue: 15 June 1965
- Country: Turkey
- Based in: Istanbul
- Language: Turkish

Tarih Dünyası (Turkish: The World of History) was a popular history magazine published in Istanbul, Turkey, for two periods: between 1950 and 1954 and 1964 and 1965.

== History and profile ==
Tarih Dünyası was established in 1950, and its first issue appeared on 15 April. Niyazi Ahmet Banoğlu was its founder and publisher. The magazine was headquartered in Istanbul. Tarih Dünyası was first published on a biweekly basis and became a monthly periodical from 15 September 1951. Its main competitor was another history magazine entitled Tarih Hazinesi (Turkish: History Treasury) which had been started by İbrahim Hakkı Konyalı, a former contributor of Tarih Dünyası. Their competition was due to the ideological differences in that Tarih Dünyası did not have a religiously nationalistic tone like Tarih Hazinesi.

It folded on 26 February 1953 after publishing a total of 38 issues and four special issues. The magazine was succeeded by Yeni Tarih Dünyası which produced 22 issues between 17 September 1953 and 1 August 1954. It was restarted with its original title on 1 December 1964 as a monthly history and political journal. However, it was closed on 15 June 1965. In the last period it published only seven issues.

=== Contributors and content ===
In the 1950s, notable contributors of Tarih Dünyası included Falih Rıfkı Atay, Süheyl Ünver, Henry Bordeaux, Fahrettin Altay and İsmail Hakkı Uzunçarşılı.

In the first period the magazine featured articles on the members of the Ottoman dynasty. One of them was written by Adnan Giz on Hafsa Sultan's letters. The other topics were as follows: harem, coffee drinking in the Empire, and the leading historic figures such as Marie Antoinette. The cover page of Tarih Dünyası featured the Ottoman Sultans and war scenes of the Ottoman soldiers.

In the second term between 1964 and 1965 the focus of Tarih Dünyası was on Atatürk and his government. In 1964 Ahmet Cevat Emre's memoir was published by Niyazi Ahmet Banoğlu in Tarih Dünyası which was about Emre's stay in Moscow.
