= Seyrani Monument =

Monument in Develi, Turkey

- Âşik Seyrânî Anıtı
- Interactive map of Seyrani Monument
- Location: Aşık Seyrani Square, Develi, Kayseri, Turkey
- Coordinates: 38°23′19.6″N 35°29′36.2″E
- Designer: Gürdal Duyar
- Type: Sculpture
- Height: 2.4 metres (7.9 ft)
- Weight: 3,000 kilograms (6,600 lb)
- Beginning date: 14 February 1976
- Completion date: 4 April 1976
- Opening date: 30 April 1976
- Dedicated to: Seyrani
- Website: www.develi.gov.tr/seyrani
- Cost: 55,000 Lira

The Seyrani Monument is a monument in Develi, Kayseri, Turkey, dedicated to Seyrani (1800–1866) who was born in the town. It was created in 1976 by the sculptor Gürdal Duyar on commission of the mayor of the Develi, and has since become a symbol of the town.

The sculpture is referred to as the Aşık Seyrani anıtı, literally meaning Ashik Seyrani monument. It depicts the Develi-born Turkish folk poet Âşık Seyrani (1800–1866) holding a Bağlama. It stands at 2.40 metres (7.9 ft) and weighs 3,000 kilograms (6,600 lb).

Gürdal Duyar working on the sculpture as shown in a newspaper of the time.

== History ==
Haşim Nezihi, a middle school principal, received a letter from students advocating for a sculpture of Seyrani to be erected and money was collected for this purpose. The Develi Seyranî Public Library and Monument Building Development Association was established in the 1970s with the goal of creating a monument to Seyrani in the center of the district. However, no activity took place concerning the intended monument until 14 February 1976, when the Develi Municipality made an agreement with sculptor Gürdal Duyar, and Develi Mayor Mehmet Özdemir commissioned Duyar to make the sculpture. The monument was placed 4 April 1976 and completed on 30 April 1976 in a park in front of the Çarşı Mosque in an area of Develi called Cumhuriyet Square. The sculpture cost 55,000 Lira.

In 1983, a base was added to the sculpture which included Seyrani's name, birth and death date, and an excerpt of his poetry. During the renovations of the mosque and the park some years later, the sculpture was moved to the old market square of Develi, where it would go on to become a symbol of the Develi district. Today the square in which it stands is referred to as Aşık Seyrani Square.

More recent renovations of the Aşık Seyrani Square included a new marble base for the monument with more of Seyrani's poetry. These renovations were completed by June 2018.
