= Falih Rıfkı Atay =

Turkish journalist, writer and politician

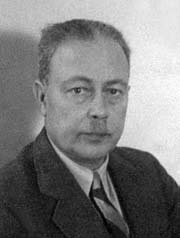
- Atay in 1939
- Born: 1894; Istanbul, Ottoman Empire
- Died: March 20, 1971 (aged 77); Istanbul, Turkey
- Occupations: Journalist, writer and politician
- Political party: Republican People's Party (CHP)
- Children: 1

Falih Rıfkı Atay (1894 – 20 March 1971) was a Turkish journalist, writer and politician between 1923 and 1950.

== Biography ==
Falih Rıfkı was the son of Halil Hilmi Efendi, an imam. He was educated in Istanbul, Ottoman Empire. Falih began his career as a journalist in the Tanin, a CUP newspaper. He later became the private secretary of Talat Pasha, and during World War I accompanied Cemal Pasha in the Sinai and Palestine campaign. After the war, he, along with three other friends, founded the newspaper Akşam, supporting the Turkish War of Independence which was being led by Mustafa Kemal Pasha. From 1919 to 1920, Falih Rıfkı was one of the contributors of the Büyük Mecmua magazine which also supported the war of independence. On September 9, 1922, he travelled to the liberated İzmir to visit Mustafa Kemal Atatürk with Yakup Kadri and arrived on the 13th of September just before the fire. Later, he became the editor-in-chief in the Hakimiyet-i Milliye. He entered politics in 1923, and served as deputy of Bolu and later Ankara in the parliament until the 1950 Turkish general election.

In the early 1950s Atay contributed to the history magazine Tarih Dünyası. He was the author of more than 30 works.

Falih Rıfkı Atay died on 20 March 1971 in Istanbul. He was interred there at Zincirlikuyu Cemetery.

== Legacy ==
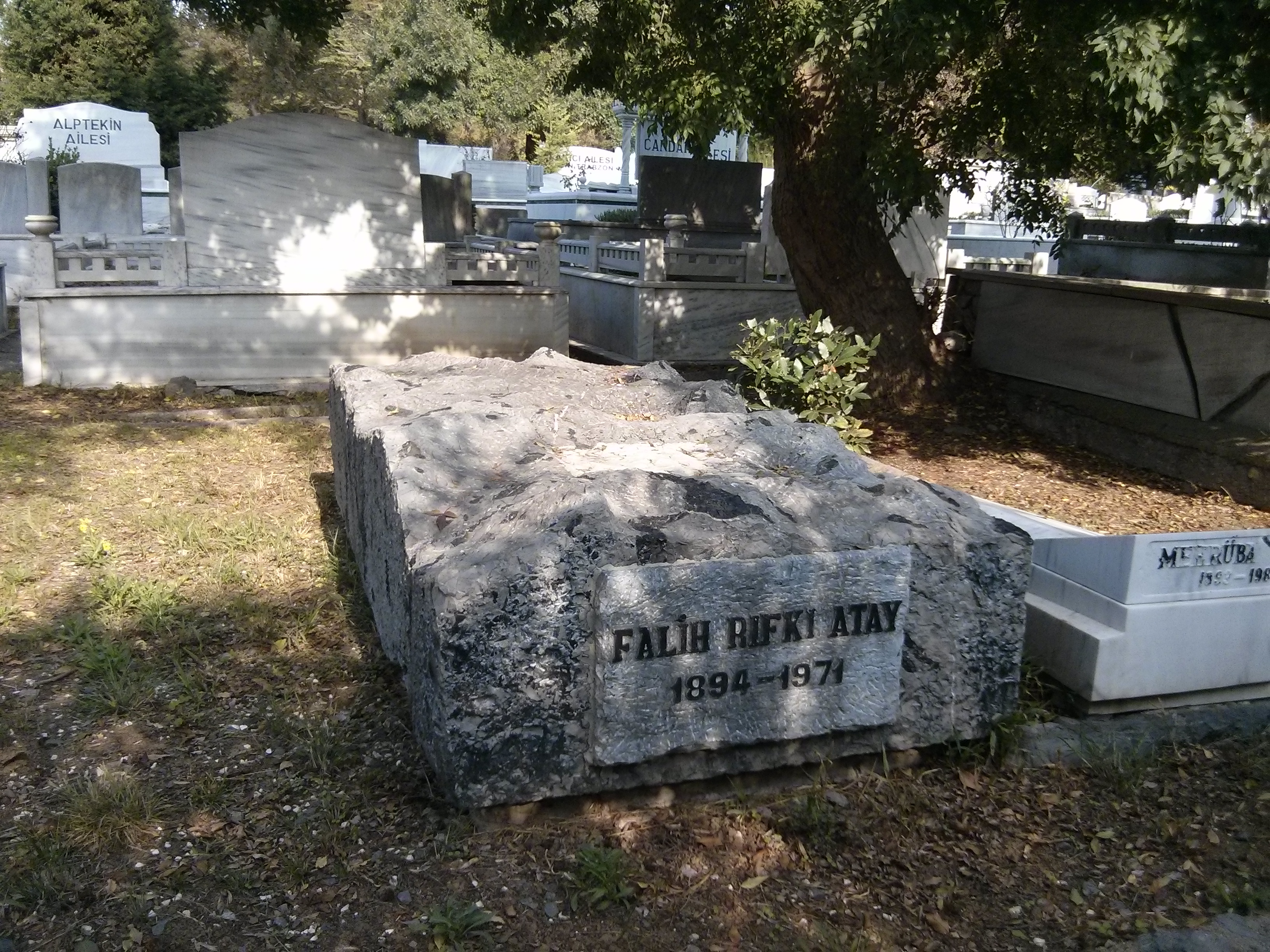
Atay's final resting place at Zincirlikuyu Cemetery

A nature park inside the Belgrad Forest in Sarıyer district of Istanbul Province was named in his honor in 2011.

== Selected works ==
- Ateş ve Güneş, (Fire and Sun), 1918, Memories of World War I in Syria and Palestine
- Zeytindağı (Mount of Olives), 1932, Memories of World War I in Syria and Palestine
- Yeni Rusya (New Russia), 1931, Travelbook
- Çankaya (See Çankaya Mansion), 1952 and 1962, Memories of Mustafa Kemal Atatürk
- Babanız Atatürk, 1955, Memories of Mustafa Kemal Atatürk

== Joint works ==
- İzmir'den Bursa’ya, (From İzmir to Bursa), 1922, Greek Atrocities during the Greek Occupation of Western Anatolia, co-authors: Halide Edip, Yakup Kadri, Ruşen Eşref and Asım Us.
