= Havadan Külliye =

Religious complex in Central Anatolia, Turkey

Havadan Külliye is an late 14th-century or early 15th-century Anatolian Seljuk külliye (meaning "a religious complex") in Kayseri's depending district of Develi's village of the same name (Havadan), in Central Anatolia, Turkey.

Consisting of a mosque, a medrese, a tekke for dervishes, a hamam (bathhouse), a fountain and a tomb (presumably of the unknown builder), the compound lies at a distance of 40 km from Develi center. Since its inscription is lost, information relating the edifice is very scarce, although it displays an accomplished architecture in late-Seljuk style, and commands a beautiful view of the plain. The buildings saw restoration in Ottoman times, as well by the municipality of Develi very recently. A large wooden combination lock and other artifacts discovered during the restoration are displayed in Kayseri Museum.
