= Companhia das Naus =

- Type: Trade association
- Founded: 1380
- Founder: Ferdinand I of Portugal
- Fate: Dissolved
- Headquarters: Lisbon; Porto, Portugal
- Area served: Kingdom of Portugal and Portuguese maritime trade routes
- Key people: King Ferdinand I (founder); Lopo Martins e Gonçalo Peres Canellas (executores)
- Services: Provided insurance for the owners of wrecked Portuguese commercial vessels

The Companhia das Naus (in English, Company of the Carracks) was a Portuguese institution founded in 1380 by King Ferdinand I. It functioned as a kind of insurance company, providing owners of Portuguese vessels with some security in case of accident and thereby fostering the development of the Portuguese navy.

All vessels weighing more than fifty casks were compulsorily registered, paying a percentage of the profits of each chartered cargo which was added to the common funds. These funds were used not only to cover the expenditures of wrecked vessels, but also to finance the construction of new vessels.

The creation of the Companhia das Naus was an important measure that would prove the forerunner of the later Portuguese overseas expansion.

King Ferdinand I assigned Lopo Martins and Gonçalo Peres Canellas as executors of the Company, and provided them with a clerk who recorded the Company's revenues and expenses. The funds were kept in a chest with three locks (one key for each executor and one for the clerk). The executors were remunerated in fifty pounds of the funds of the Company a year and the clerk in thirty pounds.

== See also ==
- Paço da Ribeira
- Ribeira das Naus

== Bibliography ==
- Lopes, Fernão (1380–1460). Chronica de el-rei D. Fernando (vol. II) (PDF) (in Portuguese). Escriptorio, 147 - Rua dos Retrozeiros, Lisbon.
