= Muhammad II Chelebi =

Fourth and last Sultan of the Eretnids from 1380 to 1381

- Sultan

Sultan of the Eretnids
- Reign: 1380–1381
- Predecessor: Ala al-Din Ali
- Successor: Usurpation by Kadi Burhan al-Din
- Regent: Kadi Burhan al-Din
- Born: c. 1373
- Died: 1390 (aged 16–17)
- Issue: Yusuf Chelebi; Ahmad; Neslikhan; Aisha; Fatima
- House: Eretnids
- Father: Ala al-Din Ali
- Religion: Islam

Muhammad II Chelebi (c. 1373 – c. 1390) was the fourth and last Sultan of the Eretnids. He was crowned when he was 7 years old, after his father died in August 1380 from the plague. His regent was Kadi Burhan al-Din, who proclaimed himself as the ruler by January 1381.

Sometime after Kadi Burhan al-Din's usurpation of the rule, a certain Ahi Nawruz planned the assassination of Kadi Burhan al-Din and likely agreed with Muhammad, as he planned to reinstall him as the ruler. Though this faction was promptly extinguished by Kadi Burhan al-Din, while Muhammad was spared. In the spring of 1387, dignitaries from Sivas, Sarraf Bayezid, Ahi Muhammad, Ahi Nasr al-Din, Emir-i Hajj, and a certain Christian priest, incited Muhammad to take over the throne as Kadi Burhan al-Din was away resting at a summer pasture. This revolt was repressed by one of the commanders of Kadi Burhan al-Din, who didn't view the revolt as a major threat.

According to Ibn Khaldun and Ibn Hajar al-Asqalani, Muhammad was killed by Kadi Burhan al-Din in 1390.

== Family ==
Muhammad is reputed to have had 2 sons, Yusuf Chelebi (died 1434) and Ahmad (d. 1433), and 3 daughters, Neslikhan Khatun (d. 1455), Aisha (d. 1436), and Fatima (d. 1430). Ahmad had a son named Muhammad (d. 1443) and grandson Ahmad, who was attested to be living in 1477.

== Bibliography ==
- Çayırdağ, Mehmet (1 April 2009). "Son Eretnalı Sultanı II. Mehmed Bey'in Mezar Taşı" [Last Eretnid Sultan Muhammad II's Gravestone]. Belleten (in Turkish). 73 (266): 109–114. ISSN 2791-6472.
- Uzunçarşılı, İsmail Hakkı (20 April 1968). "Sivas - Kayseri ve Dolaylarında Eretna Devleti" [State of Eretna in Sivas - Kayseri and Around]. Belleten (in Turkish). 32 (126). Turkish Historical Association: 161–190.
- von Zambaur, Eduard Karl Max (1927). Manuel de généalogie et de chronologie pour l'histoire de l'Islam avec 20 tableaux généalogiques hors texte et 5 cartes [Handbook of genealogy and chronology for the history of Islam: with 20 additional genealogical tables and 5 maps] (in French). H. Lafaire.
