= Köşkmedrese =

Historic building in Kayseri, Turkey

Coordinates: 38°43′00″N 35°30′38″E

Köşkmedrese is a khanqah located on Mount Köşk to the southeast of the city of Kayseri in central Turkey. According to the inscriptions on the building that ceased to exist, it was built by Eretna in memory of his consort Suli Pasha in 1339. Although originally a khanqah, it was later known and used as a madrasa. Köşkmedrese is the burial site for Eretna, his consort Suli Pasha, his son and successor Ghiyāth al-Dīn Muḥammad I, and grandson and the later successor ʿAlāʾ al-Dīn 'Ali. The name Kālūyān, possibly an Armenian architect, appears on the building.

== Bibliography ==
- Durukan, Aynur (2002). "Köşkmedrese". TDV İslâm Ansiklopedisi. TDV İslâm Araştırmaları Merkezi.
- Jackson, Cailah (4 September 2020). Islamic Manuscripts of Late Medieval Rum, 1270s-1370s Production, Patronage and the Arts of the Book. Edinburgh University Press.
