= Shadgeldi =

Emir of Amasya from 1359 to 1381

- Emir

Emir of Amasya
- First reign: August–September 1359 – 1361
- Predecessor: Shihab al-Din Ahmad Shah
- Successor: Ala al-Din Ali
- Second reign: 1361 – 1381
- Predecessor: Ala al-Din Ali
- Successor: Fakhr al-Din Ahmad
- Died: 1381
- Issue: Fakhr al-Din Ahmad
- Father: Hajji Kutlu Shah
- Religion: Islam

Hajji Sayf al-Din Shadgeldi Padishah (Old Anatolian Turkish: شاد كلدی; died 1381) (Note: Colloquially known as Shadgeldi Pasha.) was Emir of Amasya from 1359 until his death. He was the second oldest son of Hajji Kutlu Shah and became the emir of Amasya in August–September 1359. He received his education from Mawlana Fakhr al-Din Ilyas in Amasya and was a classmate of Aqsara'i. He was initially loyal to Eretna but exercised autonomy following his death.

== Early life and first reign ==
Shadgeldi was the second eldest son of Hajji Kutlu Shah. He received his education from Mawlana Fakhr al-Din Ilyas in Amasya and was a classmate of Aqsara'i. Hajji Kutlu Shah appointed him as the emir of Amasya in August–September 1359 and sent his older brother and former Emir of Amasya, Shihab al-Din Ahmad Shah, to govern Sivas, departing to fight off the Karamanids. When Kutlu Shah died and most of the military was abroad with him, Shadgeldi was forced out of Amasya by Ala al-Din Ali Beg, who claimed rule in 1361.

== Second reign ==
Several months later, Shadgeldi reclaimed the rule. He appointed the emir of Niksar, Siraj al-Din Muhammad Beg as his vizier, the kadi al-kudat (lit. 'kadis of kadis') of Amasya, Nizam al-Din Mahmud as the kazasker, Aqsara'i as the kadi of Amasya, and Gumushluoghlu Hajji Sinan al-Din Yusuf as the defterdar.

== Bibliography ==
- Uzunçarşılı, İsmail Hakkı (20 April 1968). "Sivas - Kayseri ve Dolaylarında Eretna Devleti" [State of Eretna in Sivas - Kayseri and Around]. Belleten (in Turkish). 32 (126). Turkish Historical Association: 161–190.
- Yasar, Hüseyin Hüsameddin (1927). Amasya Tarihi [History of Amasya] (in Turkish). Vol. III. Istanbul: Amasya Municipality. OCLC 19375469.
