= Chavdar (tribe) =

Tatar tribe in medieval Anatolia

Chavdar was a tribe of Tatars inhabiting western Anatolia in the 14th century. According to modern historian Faruk Sümer, the tribe's name was ultimately connected to Chavdar, a son of the Ilkhanid commander Alinaq Noyan who was active in Anatolia. According to Ottoman sources, the tribe inhabited the region around Eskişehir at the time of Osman I (r. 1299–1323) and was headed by a certain Chavdaroghlu. The name of the town Çavdarhisar likely alludes to the tribe. The tribe is known to have attacked the Ottomans in 1313 near Karacahisar.

== Bibliography ==
- Sümer, Faruk (1969). "Anadolu'da Moğollar" [Mongols in Anatolia] (PDF). Journal of Seljuk Studies (in Turkish). Ankara: Institute of Seljuk History and Civilization (published 1970). ISBN 9789751753601.
- Varlık, Mustafa Çetin (1996). "Germiyanoğulları". TDV Encyclopedia of Islam, Vol. 14 (Geli̇bolu – Haddesenâ) (in Turkish). Istanbul: Turkiye Diyanet Foundation, Centre for Islamic Studies. pp. 33–35. ISBN 978-975-389-441-8.
