= Eretna =

Founding Sultan of the Eretnids from 1343 to 1352

- Sultan
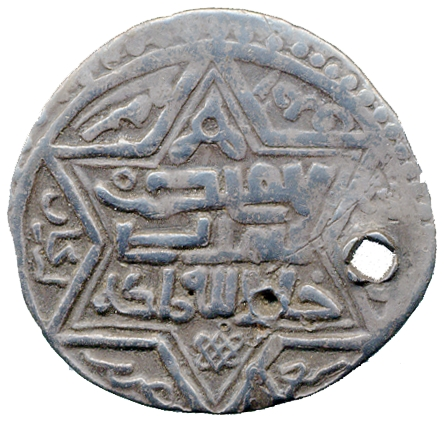
- Silver dirham minted in the name of Eretna in 1351 in Erzincan. It includes an inscription in the Uyghur script that reads sultan adil.

Sultan of the Eretnids
- Reign: 1343–1352
- Successor: Ghiyath al-Din Muhammad I

Viceroy of Anatolia
- Tenure: 1336–1343
- Predecessor: Hasan Buzurg
- Successor: Declared independence
- Died: February–August 1352; Kayseri, Eretnids
- Burial: Köşkmedrese, Kayseri
- Consort: Isfahan Shah Khatun; Suli Pasha (died 1339); Togha Khatun
- Issue: Sheikh Hasan; Izz al-Din Jafar; Ghiyath al-Din Muhammad I
Regnal name
- Ala al-Din Eretna
- House: Eretnid
- Father: Taiju Bakhshi or Jafar
- Mother: Tükälti
- Religion: Islam

Ala al-Din Eretna (Old Anatolian Turkish: ارتــنــا; died February–August 1352) (Note: Also spelled Eretne, Artanā, Ärätnä, or Ärdäni.) was the first sultan of the Eretnids, reigning from 1343 to 1352 in central and eastern Anatolia. Initially an officer in the service of the Ilkhanate officer Chupan and his son Timurtash, Eretna migrated to Anatolia following Timurtash's appointment as the Ilkhanid governor of the region. He took part in Timurtash's campaigns to subdue the Turkoman chiefs of the western periphery of the peninsula. This was cut short by Timurtash's downfall, after which Eretna went into hiding. Upon the dissolution of the Ilkhanate, he aligned himself with the Jalayirid leader Hasan Buzurg, who eventually left Anatolia for Eretna to govern when he returned east to clash with the rival Chobanids and other Mongol lords. Eretna later sought recognition from Mamluk Egypt to consolidate his power, although he played a delicate game of alternating his allegiance between the Mamluks and the Mongols. In 1343, he declared independence as the sultan of his domains. His reign was largely described to be prosperous, with his efforts to maintain order in his realm such that he became known as Köse Peyghamber (lit. 'the beardless prophet').

== Early life and background ==
The Ilkhanate emerged in West Asia under Hulagu Khan (r. 1256–1265) as part of the division of the Mongol Empire that started with Möngke Khan's reign (r. 1251–59). After half a century, the death of the seventh Ilkhan, Ghazan (r. 1295–1304), marked the height of the state, and while his brother Öljaitü (r. 1304–1316) was capable of maintaining the empire, his conversion to Shiism sped up the impending fall and civil war in the region. Eretna's life coincided with this political turmoil, which would eventually make him an heir to parts of the Ilkhanid dominion. Of Uyghur stock, Eretna was born to Jafar or Taiju Bakhshi, a trusted follower of the second Ilkhanid ruler Abaqa Khan (r. 1265–82), and his wife Tükälti. His name Eretna is popularly explained to have originated from the Sanskrit word ratna (रत्न) meaning 'jewel'. This name was common among the Uyghurs following the spread of Buddhism, and Eretna may have come from Buddhist parentage.

The growing influence of Chupan, a Mongol general, who Eretna was likely serving at the time, prompted various commanders such as Qurumushi and Irinjin to conspire a revolt. Eretna's elder brothers, Emir Taramtaz and Suniktaz, also joined this revolt, possibly because Chupan refused to grant them important positions due to his Sunni belief that conflicted with the Shiite sect espoused by the brothers. In May–June 1319, the revolt was crushed near Zanjan River. The same year, Taramtaz and Suniktaz were executed by Ilkhan Abu Sa'id for joining the rebellion of Qurumushi and Irinjin. Eretna migrated to Anatolia following his brothers' deaths and the appointment of his new master Timurtash as the Ilkhanid governor of the region by Abu Sa'id and his father, Chupan.

== Rise to power ==
Similar to other emirs, Eretna's master Timurtash eventually rebelled against the Ilkhanate in 1323, during which Eretna went into hiding. However, the Ilkhan's weak authority and the influence over the state of Timurtash's father, Chupan, led to the pardoning of Timurtash and the restoration of his position as the governor of Anatolia. He later led an extensive series of campaigns against the Turkoman emirates in Anatolia. Timurtash sent Eretna to seize control of Karahisar in August 1327. Eretna further manipulated the Konya-based Mevlevi dervish Ulu Arif Chelebi's son, Chelebi Abid, as a divine intermediary to subdue and gather the Turkoman commanders of the peripheral regions under the rule of Timurtash, who was proclaimed as a messiah (or mahdi) by himself and his supporters. (Note: The messianic claims of Timurtash were attested by various contemporary sources, who gave him such titles. He strictly maintained the Islamic laws in the region and oppressed the non-Muslims.) Upon the news of his brother Demasq Kaja's death on 24 August 1327, Timurtash retreated to Kayseri, and following his father's death, he fled to Mamluk Egypt in December while also planning to come into terms with Abu Sa'id. He was later killed on the orders of the Mamluk sultan. Fearing punishment during Timurtash's absence, Eretna took refuge in the court of Badr al-Din Beg of Karaman. Timurtash was replaced by Emir Muhammad from the Oirat tribe, who was the uncle of Abu Sa'id.

Eretna was later involved in a plot against the Ilkhan in 1334 but received a pardon and returned to Anatolia from the Ilkhanid court in Iran. With Abu Sa'id's death in 1335, the Ilkhanid period practically came to an end, leaving in its wake continuous wars between several warlords from princely houses, namely the Chobanids and the Jalayirids. Back west, Eretna came under the suzerainty of the Jalayirid viceroy of Anatolia, Hasan Buzurg but had already established his supremacy in the region to a considerable degree.

Hasan Buzurg left Eretna as his deputy in Anatolia when he departed east to oppose the Oirat chieftain Ali Padshah's attempt to occupy the Ilkhanid throne. Eretna was officially appointed as the governor of Anatolia by Hasan Buzurg following his victory against Ali Padshah. However, shortly after, in 1338, Hasan Kuchak (r. 1338–1343) gained power in the former Ilkhanid domains in the east. Hasan Kuchak was the son of Timurtash and had effectively become the pretender to his father's legacy. He defeated the Jalayirids near Aladağ and pillaged Erzincan.

The locations of towns in Anatolia.

Due to constant upheavals in the east, Eretna started seeking the protection of a new and stronger regional power. An old rival to the Mongol Empire and its successors, the Mamluks had long aspired to secure their political presence up north in Anatolia. The arrival of Eretna's embassy in Cairo favored them in this regard so that he was confirmed as a Mamluk governor of Anatolia. On the contrary, Eretna did very little to uphold Mamluk sovereignty, minting coins on behalf of the new Chobanid puppet Suleiman Khan (r. 1339–1343) in 1339. Thus, the Mamluks started viewing the rising Turkoman leader Zayn al-Din Qaraja of Dulkadir (r. 1337–1353) more favorably. In 1338–1339, Eretna lost Darende to Qaraja, who was continuing to enlarge his realm at the expense of Eretna. Having been robbed of the wealth he had stored in the latter city, Eretna confronted the Mamluk sultan, who brought up his failure to declare Mamluk sovereignty. In return, Eretna finally minted coins for the Mamluks in 1339–40. Despite the loss of Darende, Eretna was able to gain control of Konya from the Karamanids as well as Sivas at an unknown date.

Eretna's attempt to be on good terms with the Chobanids was hindered by Hasan Kuchak's capture of Erzurum and siege of Avnik. Eretna still insisted on his obedience to Suleiman Khan, although by 1341, he had gained enough power to be able to issue his coins in his own name. He first declared his independence in 1341 as it was when he first used the title sultan in his coins. Though, he did not hesitate to send his ambassadors to Cairo to secure Mamluk protection and his status as a na'ib (viceroy) amidst political turmoil within the Mamluks. This elicited a new expedition by Hasan Kuchak in Eretna's lands.

Choosing to stay in Tabriz, Hasan Kuchak dispatched his army to Anatolia under Suleiman Khan's command. This force included experienced commanders such as Abdul, the son of Bayanjar, (Note: Bayanjar was a Mongol emir loyal to the seventh Ilkhan, Ghazan. He was related to Subutai.) Yaqub Shah, and Qoch Hussain. Eretna promptly gathered an army of Mamluk forces, Mongols, and local Turks. The battle took place in the plain of Karanbük (between Sivas and Erzincan) in September–October 1343. Eretna initially faced defeat. While Suleiman Khan's forces were busy with looting and pursuing the remainder of enemy, Eretna hid behind a nearby hill and led a final attack when Suleiman Khan appeared with a small number of troops, with the rest of his forces disorganized. The Chobanid army disintegrated when Suleiman Khan fled the scene. Eretna's victory was unexpected for most actors in the region. This victory resulted in the Eretnid annexation of Erzincan and several cities further east, also marking the beginning of Eretna's independent reign. Fortunately for Eretna, Hasan Kuchak was murdered by his own wife, who feared the discovery of her extramarital affairs with Yaqub Shah, imprisoned by Hasan Kuchak for his alleged flaws at the Battle of Karanbük. This prevented any retaliation for Eretna's earlier victory.

== Reign ==
After the battle and Hasan Kuchak's death, Eretna assumed the title sultan without any backlash, circulated coins in his name once more, and formally declared sovereignty as part of the khutbah (sermon). He took the laqab (honorific nickname) Ala al-Din, which is attested in his coins and his contemporary Maghrebi traveller Ibn Battuta's Rihla, but he was also referred to as Sayf al-Din in his son Sheikh Hasan's epitaph and Rashid al-Din according to the Ottoman–Turkish historian Hüseyin Hüsameddin Yasar. Eretna additionally expanded his borders beyond Erzurum. He faced a reduced number of threats to his rule in this period: Despite the intentions of the new Chobanid ruler Malek Ashraf (r. 1343–57) to wage a war against him, such an expedition never came to be. The political vacuum in Mamluk Egypt, following the death of Sultan Al-Nasir Muhammad in 1341 (r. 1293–1294, 1299–1309), allowed Eretna to take Darende from the Mamluks. The Dulkadirid ruler Qaraja's focus in pillaging the Armenian Kingdom of Cilicia and tensions with the Mamluk emirs also made an attack from the south unlikely. Eretna further took advantage of the Karamanid ruler Ahmed's death in 1350, capturing Konya. Overall, Eretna's realm extended from Konya to Ankara and Erzurum, also incorporating Kayseri, Amasya, Tokat, Çorum, Develi, Karahisar, Zile, Canik, Ürgüp, Niğde, Aksaray, Erzincan, Şebinkarahisar, and Darende, with the capital initially situated in Sivas and later Kayseri.

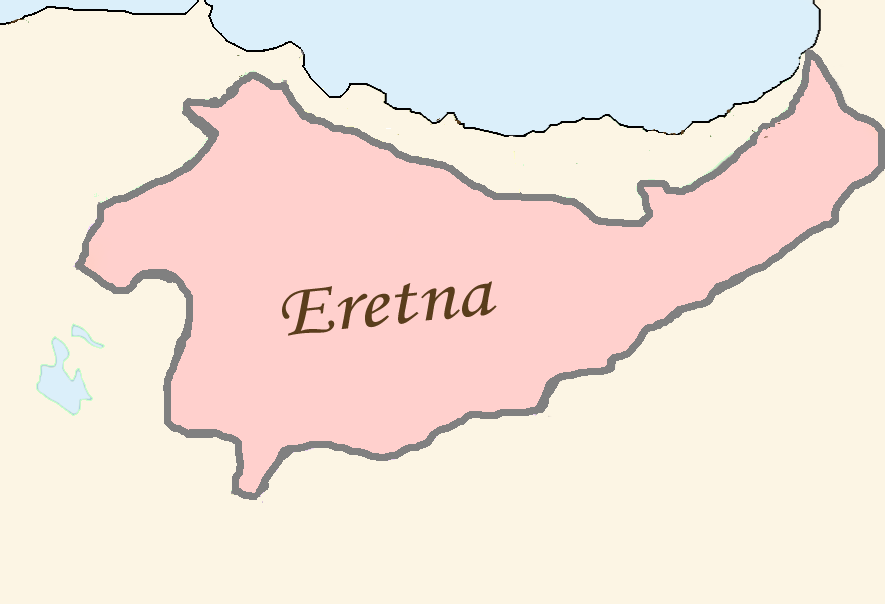
Rough extent of Eretna's domains

Eretna was a fluent Arabic-speaker according to Ibn Battuta and was considered a scholar among the scholars of his era. He was famously known as Köse Peyghamber (lit. 'the beardless prophet') by his subjects who looked upon him favorably because his rule preserved order in a region that was politically crumbling apart. He promoted and reinforced the sharia law in his domains and showed an effort to respect and sustain the ulama, sayyids, and sheikhs (Islamic dignitaries). An exception to the praise he received was the accusation put forward by the Egyptian historian al-Maqrizi (1364–1442) that he allowed the state to later fall apart.

Eretna benefited from the support of the significant population of Mongol tribes in Central Anatolia (referred to as Qara Tatars in sources) in asserting his rule. He thus highlighted his succession to the Mongol tradition despite his Uyghur origin. When he stopped referring to an overlord after 1341–2 and issued his own coins, he utilized the Uyghur script, which was also used for Mongolian, to underline the Mongol heritage he sought to represent. According to historian Andrew Peacock, "Eretna's coinage reflects the complicated and uncertain position of rulers of medieval Anatolia, who experimented with different forms of legitimacy in a period when established modes, even the much vaunted concept of Chinggisid legitimacy, seem to have broken down." In spite of that, instead of the Mongols, who were numerous in the region from Kütahya to Sivas, Eretna appointed mamluks (slave-soldiers) and local Turks in administrative positions, fearing the rebirth of Mongol rule. Eretna was still not totally successful in the long run, as his descendants would be evicted from the throne by Kadi Burhan al-Din (r. 1381–98), who highlighted his maternal Seljuk descent but also depended on the military support of some of the Mongol tribes.

Despite the existence of some texts that described his character and skills, there is a scant number of surviving literary works that were dedicated to his and his descendants' rule. One such text was a short Persian tafsir (exegesis) in al-As'ila wa'l-Ajwiba by Aqsara'i commissioned by the Eretnid emir of Amasya, Sayf al-Din Shadgeldi (died 1381). Another instance was an astrological almanac (taqwīm) created for the last Eretnid ruler Ala al-Din Ali in 1371–1372. There are also no surviving mosques, madrasas, caravanserais, hospitals, or bridges dated back to Eretna's rule, with the exception of tombs.

Eretna died in February, March, or August 1352 and was buried in the kumbet (dome) located in the courtyard of Köşkmedrese in Kayseri.

== Family ==
Eretna's wives included Suli Pasha (died 1339), Togha Khatun (Note: Ibn Battuta wrote about having met her in Kayseri.) and Isfahan Shah Khatun. He was known to have had three sons: Hasan, Muhammad, and Jafar. The oldest son, Sheikh Hasan was the governor of Sivas and died in December 1347 or January 1348 due to sickness shortly after he wed an Artuqid princess. Eretna's successor and youngest son, Ghiyath al-Din Muhammad I was born to Isfahan Shah Khatun, who was a relative of the Jalayirid ruler Hasan Buzurg.

== Bibliography ==
- Bosworth, Clifford Edmund (1996). New Islamic Dynasties: A Chronological and Genealogical Manual. Edinburgh University Press. ISBN 978-0-231-10714-3. OCLC 35029627.
- Cahen, Claude (1965). "Eretna". In Lewis, B.; Pellat, Ch. & Schacht, J. (eds.). The Encyclopaedia of Islam, Second Edition. Volume II: C–G. Leiden: E. J. Brill. OCLC 495469475.
- Göde, Kemal (1995). "Eretnaoğulları". TDV Encyclopedia of Islam, Vol. 11 (Elbi̇stan – Eymi̇r) (in Turkish). Istanbul: Presidency of Religious Affairs, Centre for Islamic Studies. pp. 295–296. ISBN 978-975-389-438-8.
- Masters, Bruce Alan; Ágoston, Gábor (2010). Encyclopedia of the Ottoman Empire. Infobase. ISBN 978-1-4381-1025-7. OCLC 227205977.
- Melville, Charles (12 March 2009). "Anatolia under the Mongols". In Fleet, Kate (ed.). The Cambridge History of Turkey (1 ed.). Cambridge University Press. pp. 51–101. doi:10.1017/chol9780521620932.004. ISBN 978-1-139-05596-3.
- Nicolle, David (2008). The Ottomans: Empire of Faith. Thalamus. ISBN 978-1-902886-11-4. OCLC 455106992.
- Peacock, Andrew Charles Spencer (17 October 2019). Islam, Literature and Society in Mongol Anatolia. Cambridge University Press. doi:10.1017/9781108582124. ISBN 978-1-108-49936-1. OCLC 1124923987.
- Sinclair, T. A. (31 December 1989). Eastern Turkey: An Architectural & Archaeological Survey. Vol. II. Pindar Press. ISBN 978-0-907132-33-2. OCLC 16887803.
- Sinclair, Thomas (6 December 2019). Eastern Trade and the Mediterranean in the Middle Ages: Pegolotti's Ayas-Tabriz Itinerary and Its Commercial Context. Taylor & Francis. ISBN 978-1-00-075267-0. OCLC 1119073048.
- Spuler, Bertold & Ettinghausen, Richard (1971). "Īlk̲h̲āns". In Lewis, B.; Ménage, V. L.; Pellat, Ch. & Schacht, J. (eds.). The Encyclopaedia of Islam, Second Edition. Volume III: H–Iram. Leiden: E. J. Brill. OCLC 495469525.
- Sümer, Faruk (1969). "Anadolu'da Moğollar" [Mongols in Anatolia] (PDF). Journal of Seljuk Studies (in Turkish). Ankara: Institute of Seljuk History and Civilization (published 1970). ISBN 9789751753601.
- Uzunçarşılı, İsmail Hakkı (20 April 1968). "Sivas – Kayseri ve Dolaylarında Eretna Devleti" [State of Eretna in Sivas – Kayseri and Around]. Belleten (in Turkish). 32 (126). Turkish Historical Association: 161–190. ISSN 2791-6472.
