= Izz al-Din Jafar =

Sultan of the Eretnids from 1354 to 1355

- Sultan

Sultan of the Eretnids
- Reign: 1354–1355
- Predecessor: Ghiyath al-Din Muhammad I
- Successor: Ghiyath al-Din Muhammad I
- House: Eretnid
- Father: Ala al-Din Eretna
- Religion: Islam

Izz al-Din Jafar was Sultan of the Eretnids from 1354 to 1355. Although his younger brother Ghiyath al-Din Muhammad I was favored and allowed to rise to the throne by the Eretnid emirs, his incompetence in governance led Izz al-Din Jafar to become the sultan a short while after. The next year, Muhammad restored his rule and drove Jafar away.

== Bibliography ==
- Çayırdağ, Mehmet (August 2000). "Eretnalı Beyliğinin Paraları" [Coinage of the Eretna Principality]. Belleten (in Turkish). 64 (240). Turkish Historical Society: 435–452. doi:10.37879/belleten.2000.435. ISSN 2791-6472.
- Uzunçarşılı, İsmail Hakkı (20 April 1968). "Sivas - Kayseri ve Dolaylarında Eretna Devleti" [State of Eretna in Sivas - Kayseri and Around]. Belleten (in Turkish). 32 (126). Turkish Historical Association: 161–190.
