= Develi =

Develi Everek
- District and municipality
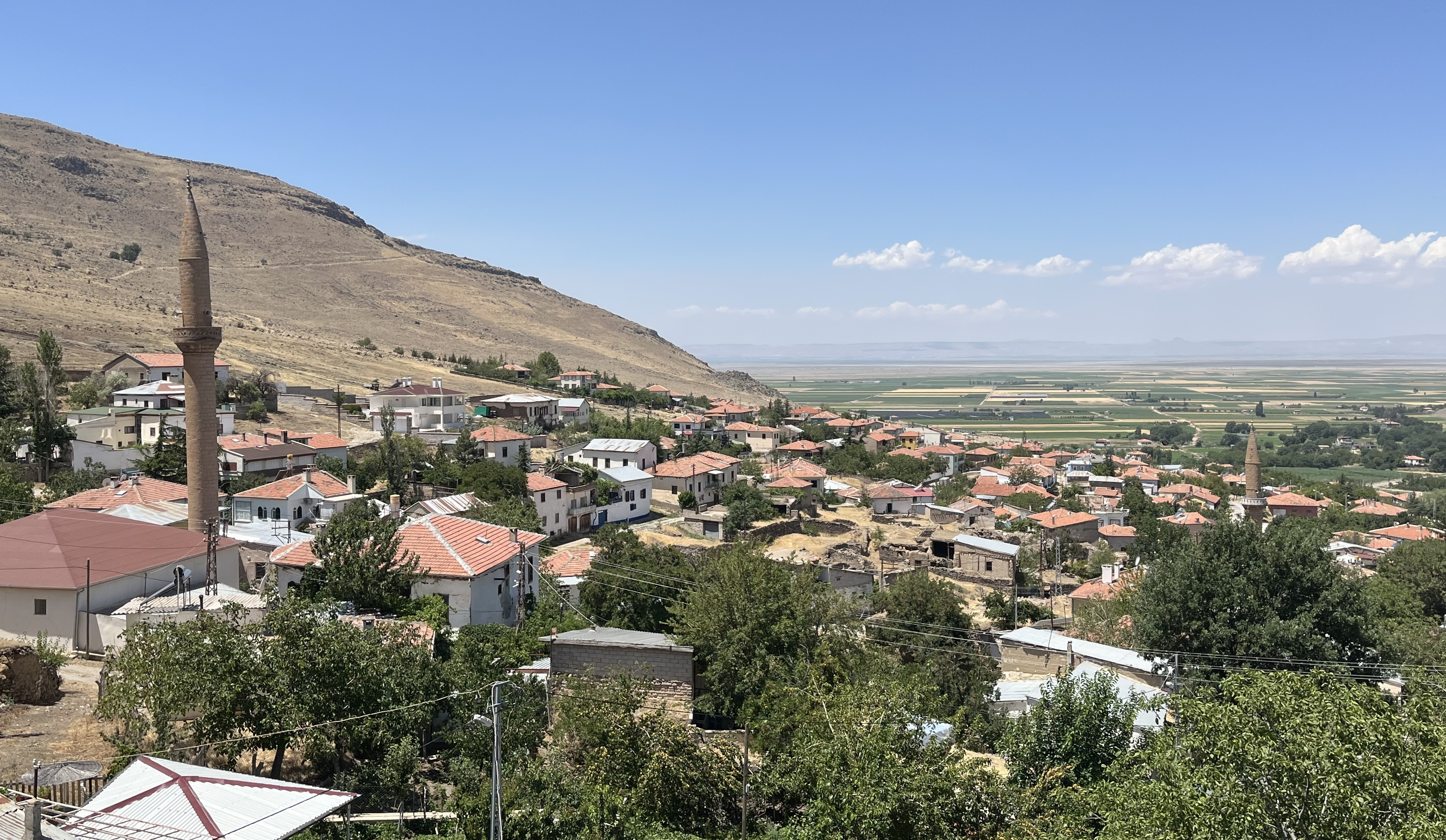
- General view of Zile neighborhood in Develi

- Logo

- Map showing Develi District in Kayseri Province

- Location within Turkey Location within Turkey Central Anatolia
- Coordinates: 38°23′19″N 35°29′33″E
- Country: Turkey
- Province: Kayseri

Government
  - Mayor: Mehmet Cabbar (AKP)
- Area: 1,892 km^{2} (731 sq mi)
- Population (2022): 66,840
  - Density: 35.33/km^{2} (91.50/sq mi)
- Time zone: UTC+3 (TRT)
- Postal code: 38400
- Area code: 0352
- Website: www.develi.bel.tr

Develi, formerly known as Averak or Everek, is a municipality and district of Kayseri Province, Turkey. Its area is 1,892 km^{2}, and its population is 66,840 (2022).

== History ==
The historical name of the town is Everek and it is called Averak (ruin) in Armenian. A historian and geographer who lived in the fourteenth century, gives the name of the butcher Mustavfi as Davalu. According to him, it was a medium-sized city and its walls were rebuilt by Seljuk Sultan Alaeddin. In the work called Cihannüma, written in the seventeenth century, the town is called Davahlu.

According to historical sources, cultural traces of civilizations that lived in Develi between 2500 and 2000 BC have been found. There is still a need for scientific research in Develi, which hosts many civilizations in the historical process between the Copper Age, the Bronze Age and the Seljuk Period. From 1867 until 1922, Develi was part of Angora vilayet. Following the Circassian genocide, many displaced Circassians were resettled in the region of Develi by the Ottoman Empire. According to the 1914 Ottoman population statistics, the district of Develi had a total population of 49.128, consisting of 30.948 Muslims, 15.689 Armenians, 2.085 Greeks, 404 Catholics and 2 Protestants.

The Fatih Mosque of Lower Everek (Aşağı Everek Fatih Camisi) has its origins as a 200-year-old Armenian church in Everek quarter. The decaying building was first transformed into a mosque in 1978 and, when routine maintenance works were initiated in 1998, it was discovered that the interior decoration was still very much present, simply covered with plaster as they were during the 1978 transformation. This discovery led to an ongoing divergence of opinions between the national authority for foundations, responsible for maintenance of mosques in Turkey, which is in favor of covering the cross and Virgin Mary figures again, and Kayseri Governorship's cultural protection unit which advocates a restoration to their state of origin, a move that would put an end to the edifice's use as a mosque, this use currently being restrained to a part of the building until an official decision is made. In 2004, in order to protect the cultural heritage, the works were ordered to be stopped by the then mayor of Develi, Ali Ağca, while an intermediate solution was found in between.

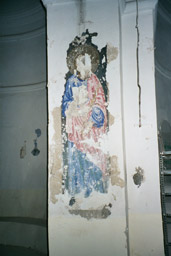
Virgin Mary painting inside the old Armenian Everek/Evereg church, St. Toros, now a mosque, during renovations in 2000

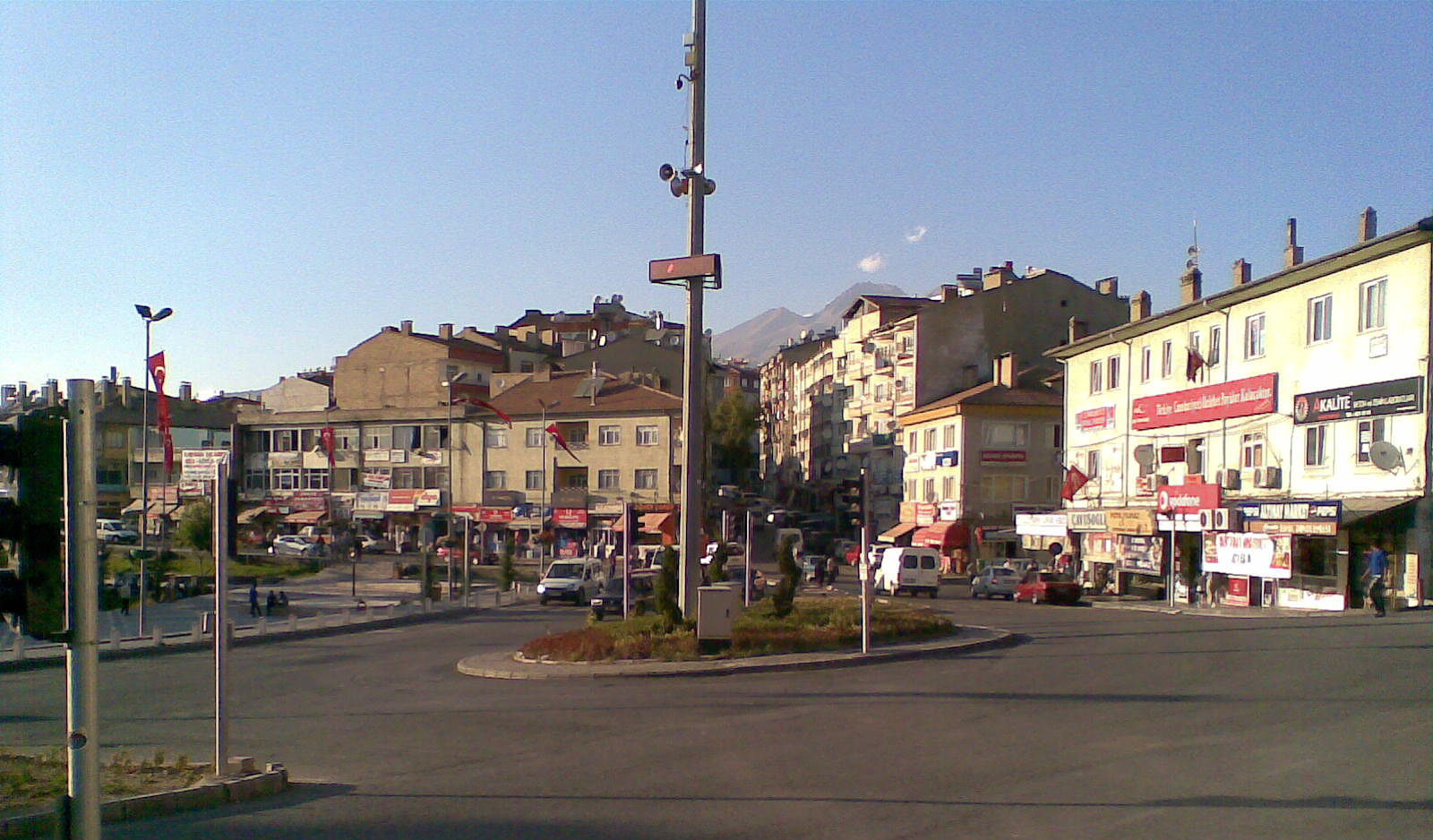
Cumhuriyet Square

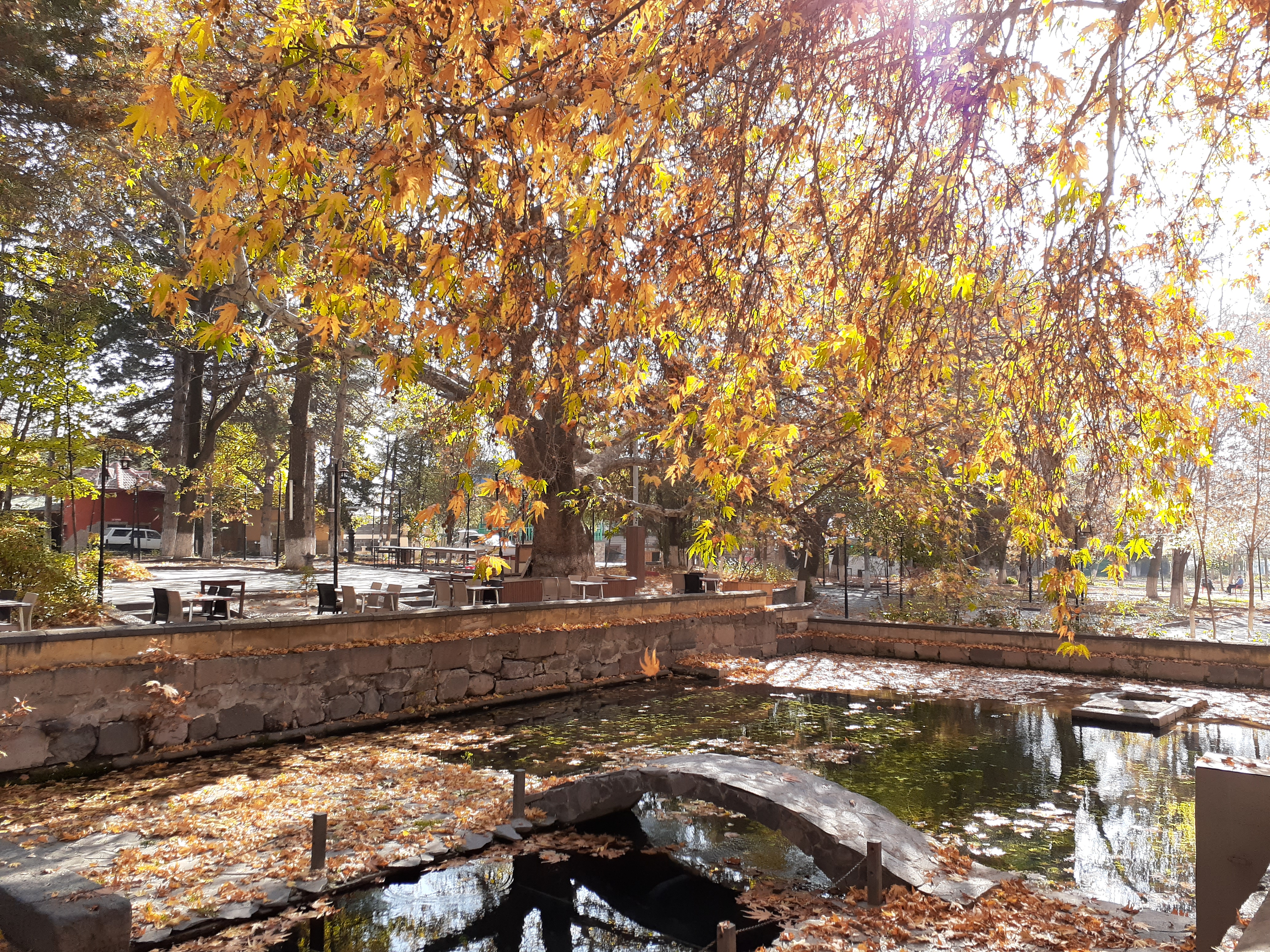
Elbiz Park in Develi

== Composition ==
There are 78 neighbourhoods in Develi District:

- Abdulbaki
- Alparslan
- Aşağı Everek
- Aşık Seyrani
- Ayşepınar
- Ayvazhacı
- Bahçebaşı
- Bahçelievler
- Büyükkünye
- Çadıryeri
- Camiicedit
- Çataloluk
- Çayırözü
- Çaylıca
- Çomaklı
- Çöten
- Çukuryurt
- Cumhuriyet
- Derebaşı
- Dereşimli
- Develi Camikebir
- E.Camikebir
- Epçe
- Eşelik
- Fatih
- Fenese Aşağı
- Fenese Yukarı
- Gazi
- Gömedi
- Gümüşören
- Güney Aşağı
- Güney Yukarı
- Harman
- Havadan
- Hoşça
- Hüseyinli
- İbrahim Ağa
- İncesu
- İzmirli
- Kabaklı
- Kaleköy
- Karacaören
- Kılıçkaya
- Kızık
- Kopçullu
- Köseler
- Kozluca
- Küçükkünye
- Kulpak
- Mehmet Akif Ersoy
- Millidere
- Mustafa Asım Köksal
- Öksüt
- Reşadiye
- Şahmelik
- Saraycık
- Sarıca
- Sarıkaya
- Satı
- Şehit Üsteğmen Hasan Şahan
- Şıhlı
- Sindelhöyük Camikebir
- Sindelhöyük Fatih
- Sindelhöyük Yenice
- Sindelhüyük
- Soysallı
- Taşçı
- Tombak
- Yaylacık
- Yazıbaşı
- Yedek
- Yenice
- Yenihayat
- Yeniköy
- Yenimahalle
- Yeşilyurt
- Yüzevler
- Zile

== Logo ==
The logo of the Develi Municipality features the Seyrani Monument and mausoleum of Dev Ali in front of Mount Erciyes among other elements such as flamingos. It is not to be confused with the corporate identity of Develi which features a Seljuk motif, or the red logo of the Develi Kaymakamlık.

Seal of the Governorship of Develi

== Notable people ==
- Sarkis Torossian (1891–1954), Armenian Ottoman captain and French Armenian Legion veteran.
- Tarık Galip Somer (1926–1997), Turkish academic and rector of Ankara University.
- Burhan Kuzu (1955–2020), Turkish politician.
- Mustafa İslamoğlu (b. 1960), Turkish theologian, poet and writer.

== See also ==
- Havadan Külliye

== External sources ==
- Develi Municipality
- Develi District Governorship
- Develi web portal
- Krikorian, Aleksan. Evereg-Fenesse: Its Armenian History and Traditions. Detroit, MI: Evereg-Fenesse Mesrobian-Roupinian Educational Society, 1990. 186 pp.
- Evereg Fenesse Educational Society
- Der-Sarkissian, Jack. “A Tale of Twin Towns: Everek and Fenesse.” Armenian Kesaria/Kayseri and Cappadocia . Ed. Richard G. Hovannisian. Costa Mesa, California: Mazda Publishers, 2013. https://www.researchgate.net/publication/260676697_A_Tale_of_Twin_Towns_Everek_and_Fenesse
