= Aqsara'i =

14th-century Persian/Turkish physician

Aqsara'i آق‌سرایی
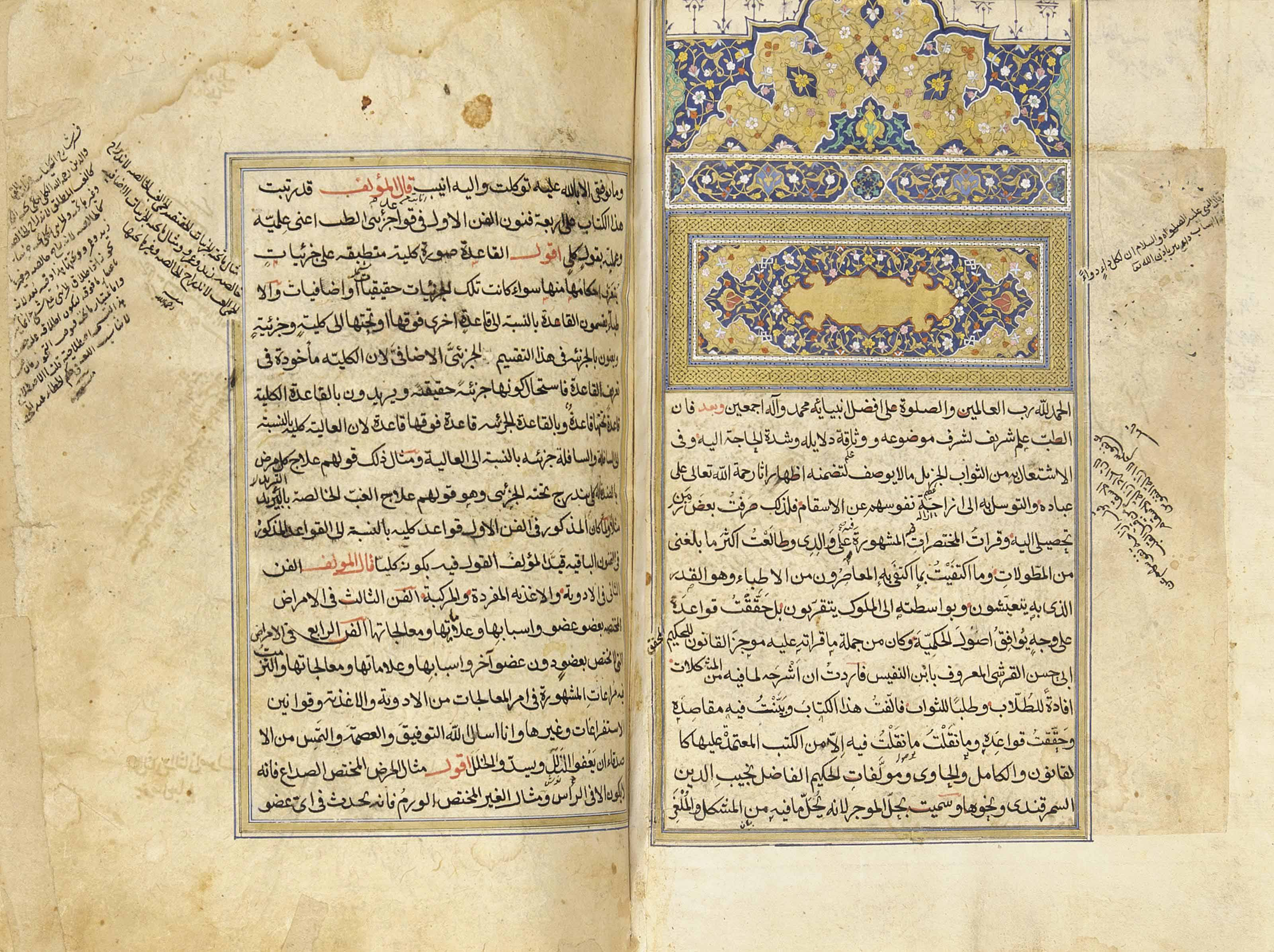
- Manuscript of al-Aqsara'i's Hall al-Mujiz. Copy made in Bukhara (present-day Uzbekistan), dated June-July 1583
- Medical career
- Profession: Physician

Jamal al-Din Muhammad ibn Muhammad ibn Muhammad ibn Fakhr al-Din al-Razi (Persian: جمال‌الدین محمد بن محمد آق‌سرایی) (died 1379), also written al-Aqsara'i, was a 14th-century Muslim Iranian physician. He became known as Aqsara'i because he moved to Aqsara region of what is now Turkey.

He is known for his commentary on the Mujaz, which was an epitome made in the 13th century by Ibn al-Nafis of The Canon of Medicine of Avicenna.

Al-Aqsara'i studied medicine with his father, under whose tutelage he first read the Mujaz. Thereafter he studied The Canon of Medicine itself, as well as the Hawi by Razi and the Complete Book on Medicine by al-Majusi, as well as the medical writings of Najib al-Din al-Samarqandi. He employed these other treatises in his commentary on the Mujaz, and he titled his commentary "The Key to the Mujaz" (Hall al-Mujaz).

He died in 1379.

== See also ==
- List of Iranian scientists
