= İsmail Hakkı Uzunçarşılı =

Turkish politician (1888–1977)

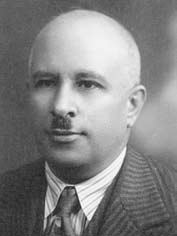

Member of the Grand National Assembly

Personal details
- Born: 23 August 1888 Constantinople, Ottoman Empire
- Died: 10 October 1977 (aged 89) Istanbul

İsmail Hakkı Uzunçarşılı (23 August 1888 – 10 October 1977) was a Turkish politician, educator and historian, who was a member of parliament and the Turkish Historical Association. In the early 1950s he was one of the contributors of the history magazine Tarih Dünyası.
