= Beyliks of Canik =

Group of Anatolian beyliks in the 14th and 15th centuries

- 1300s (decade)–1460
- Map of the Beyliks of Canik
- Capital: (various)
- Common languages: Turkish
- Religion: Islam
- Government: Beylik
- History
  - Collapse of the Sultanate of Rum: 1300s (decade)
  - Annexation by the Ottoman Empire: 1460
Preceded by	Succeeded by
Sultanate of Rum	Ottoman Empire
- Today part of: Turkey

Beyliks of Canik (Turkish: Canik beylikleri) was a group of small Turkish principalities in northern Anatolia during the fourteenth and fifteenth centuries. Anthony Bryer connects the toponym Chanik with the name "Chani" which the Laz people call themselves.

== Background ==
After the battle of Köse Dağ in 1243, the Ilkhanid Mongols achieved a hegemony over Anatolia. The Seljuk sultans became the puppets of Ilkhanids and the former generals of Seljuks as well as Turkoman tribes within Seljuk realm who accepted the suzerainty of Ilkhanids, established themselves as semi-independent principalities called beylik. However, the middle Black Sea region of Anatolia lacked a dominant leader, and a series of beyliks emerged, ruled by the members of the same family. Those beyliks were smaller than the beyliks in the other regions of Anatolia and they were nominal vassals of Eretnids. They lived in frequent warfare and their history is highly turbulent. Historians call all of them Beyliks of Canik. (Nowadays Canik is the name of a mountain system in the Middle Black Sea region as well as one of the second-level municipalities of Greater Samsun)

== The beyliks ==
In the following table, the names usually refer to the founder of the beylik, (where the suffix "...oğulları" means "sons of") with the exception of Bafra which is the name of the capital city of the beylik.

Name of the beylik	Founder	Parent Dynasty	Capital	End of duration
Beylik of Bafra		No parent dynasty	Bafra	1460
Hacıemiroğulları	Kuştoğan	Danishmendids	Mesudiye	1427
Kubadoğulları Beylik	Tâceddin Altunbaş	Seljuk dynasty	Ladik, Samsun	1422
Kutluşah Beylik	Kutlu Şâh	No parent dynasty	Amasya	1381
Taceddinoğulları	Emir Tâcüddîn Bey	No parent dynasty	Niksar	1415
Taşanoğulları Beylik	Taşan Bey	No parent dynasty	Merzifon	1398

All of the beyliks were incorporated in the Ottoman Empire.

== The monarchs ==
Some members of the dynasties are:

Kutluşah:

- Hacı Kutlu Şah Bey (1340–1361)
- Hacı Şâdgeldi Bey (1361–1381)
- Fahrüddîn Ahmed Bey (1381–1393)

Taceddinoğulları (Tâcüddînoğulları)

- Tâcüddîn Doğan Şah (1308-–346)
- Emir Tâcüddîn Bey (1346–1387)
- Mahmud Çelebi (1387–1423)
- Hüsâmüddîn Hasan Bey (1423–1425)

Hacıemiroğulları: (Bayramoğulları)

- Kuştoğan
- Hacı Bayram Bey (1313–1331)
- Hacı Emir Bey (1331–1361)
- Suleiman Bey (1386–1392)

Kubadoğulları:

- Tâcüddîn Altunbaş
- Keykubad Bey
- Kubadoğlu Ali Bey
- Kubadoğlu Cüneyd Bey
- Kubadoğlu Hüseyin Bey
