= Beylik =

Beylik is a Turkish word, meaning "the territory under the jurisdiction of a Bey", and may refer to:

- Duchy or principality, typically in the Middle East
- Beylik of Çubukoğulları
- Beylik of Bafra
- Beylik of Hacıemir, an beylik in the north Anatolia in a part of 14th and 15th centuries
- Beylik of Dulkadir, one of the frontier principalities
- Beylik of Erzincan, a principality in east Anatolia, Turkey in the fourteenth and early fifteenth centuries
- Beylik, Karacabey
- Beylik of Tacettin, a small Turkmen principality in Anatolia in the 14th and 15th centuries
- Beylik of Tunis
- Anatolian beyliks
- Beuluk, a member of the Ottoman sultan's janissary bodyguard
- Bəylik (disambiguation), places in Azerbaijan
- Beylik, administrative units (historic divisions) of Crimean Khanate in Tatar Crimea
