= Beçin =

Historical fort in Turkey

Beçin (also known as Berçin or Peçin) was a historical fort in Turkey.

== Geography ==
Beçin is situated on a low hill just south west of a modern village bearing the same name, in Milas ilçe (district center) of Muğla Province at 37°16′30″N 27°47′21″E. Its distance to Milas is 4 kilometres (2.5 mi) and to Muğla is 66 kilometres (41 mi).

== History ==
The site has remains from the Hellenistic period, including a 4th-century temple. A Byzantine church indicates the settlement continued to exist into the medieval period - though its minor importance is suggested by the small dimensions of the church. According to a contemporary Italian source its name was Pezona. Towards the end of the 13th century it was captured by the Menteşe Beylik, a principality founded by a Turkmen tribe. Beçin became the capital of the beylik and it expanded rapidly in size. In 1333 Ibn Battuta visited Beçin, described it as a newly founded city, and mentioned its houses and mosques. The majority of the surviving monuments originate from the 14th century. In the 15th century the beylik of Menteşe was annexed by the Ottoman Empire. An indication of the town's subsequent decay is revealed in Evliya Çelebi's account of his visit there in the middle of the 17th century: he wrote that the town did not have a hammam, yet excavations have revealed the remains of five hammams. A settlement continued to exist inside the site until the 1980s.

== Monuments ==
The Ahmet Gazi Madrasa, named after the Bey who commissioned it, dates from 1375 according to the Arabic inscription above its entrance. The entrance portal, while retaining the components of a traditional Seljuk-era portal, has details that resemble European Gothic architecture, possibly indicating an influence deriving from the Menteşe Beylik's commercial activities with the Aegean islands, Italy and southern France (the Bey is described as "Sultan of the Coasts" in the inscription). Modern reconstruction work has rebuilt large sections of the entrance façade on each side of its portal. The madrasa has eight chambers and two iwans, opening directly onto a rectangular central courtyard (the usual portico is not present here). The grave of Ahmet Gazi is located in the main iwan, an adjoining grave may be that of another Menteşe ruler - Shujaeddin Bey.
Kizil Han or Kızılhan ("Red Khan"), a caravanserai, is a two-story structure and one of two hans surviving in Beçin. It is plain and unimposing, and is partially ruined with its upper floor collapsed.
Buyuk Hammam, (the "large bathhouse"), is one of five hammams that once existed in the town. All are now in ruins. The Buyuk Hammam must have once been one of the town's most imposing structures - though now most of its roof has collapsed. Excavations have revealed its internal rooms and exposed its original floor level, which is paved with marble blocks.

== Gallery ==
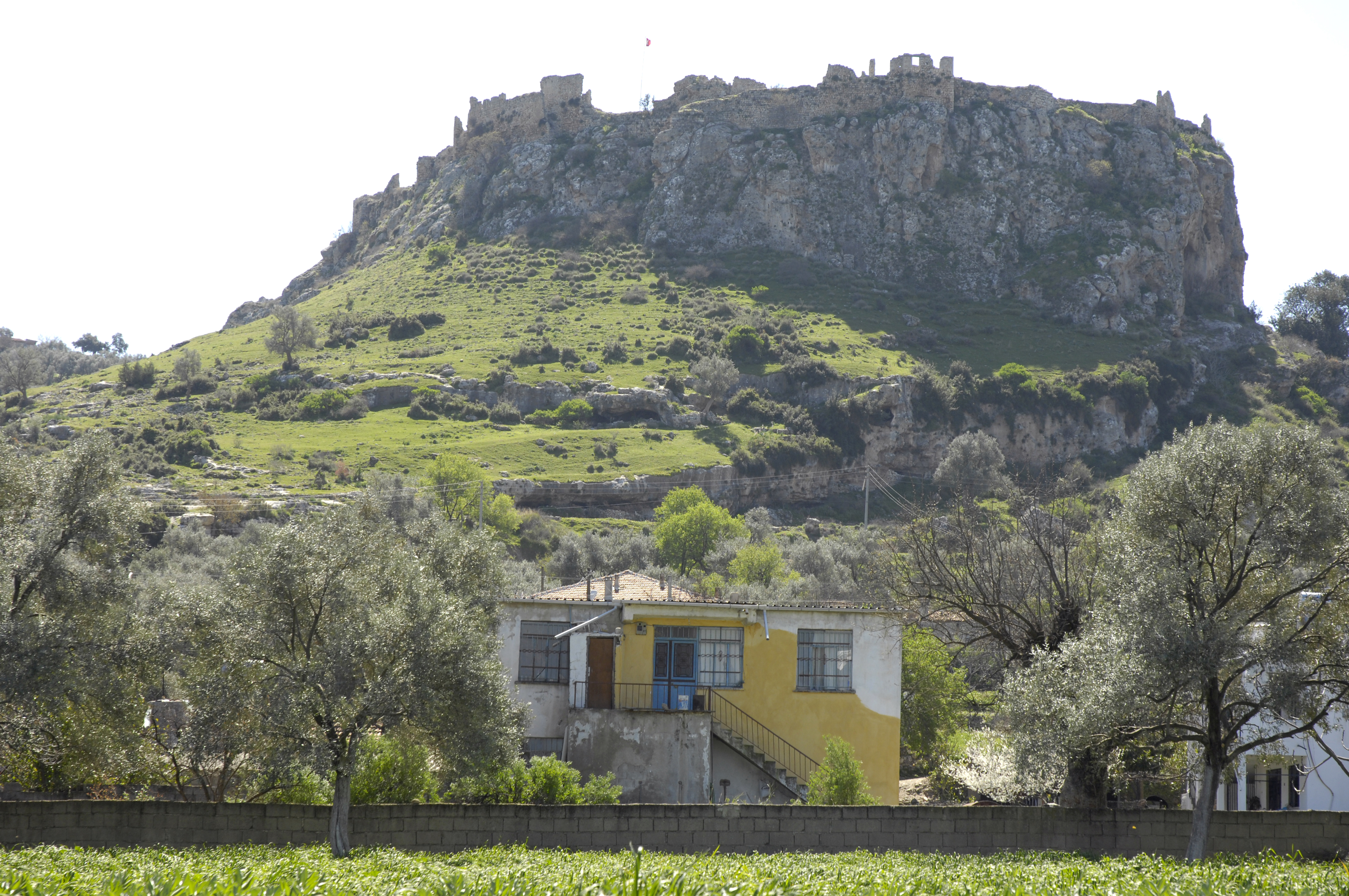
Beçin from below

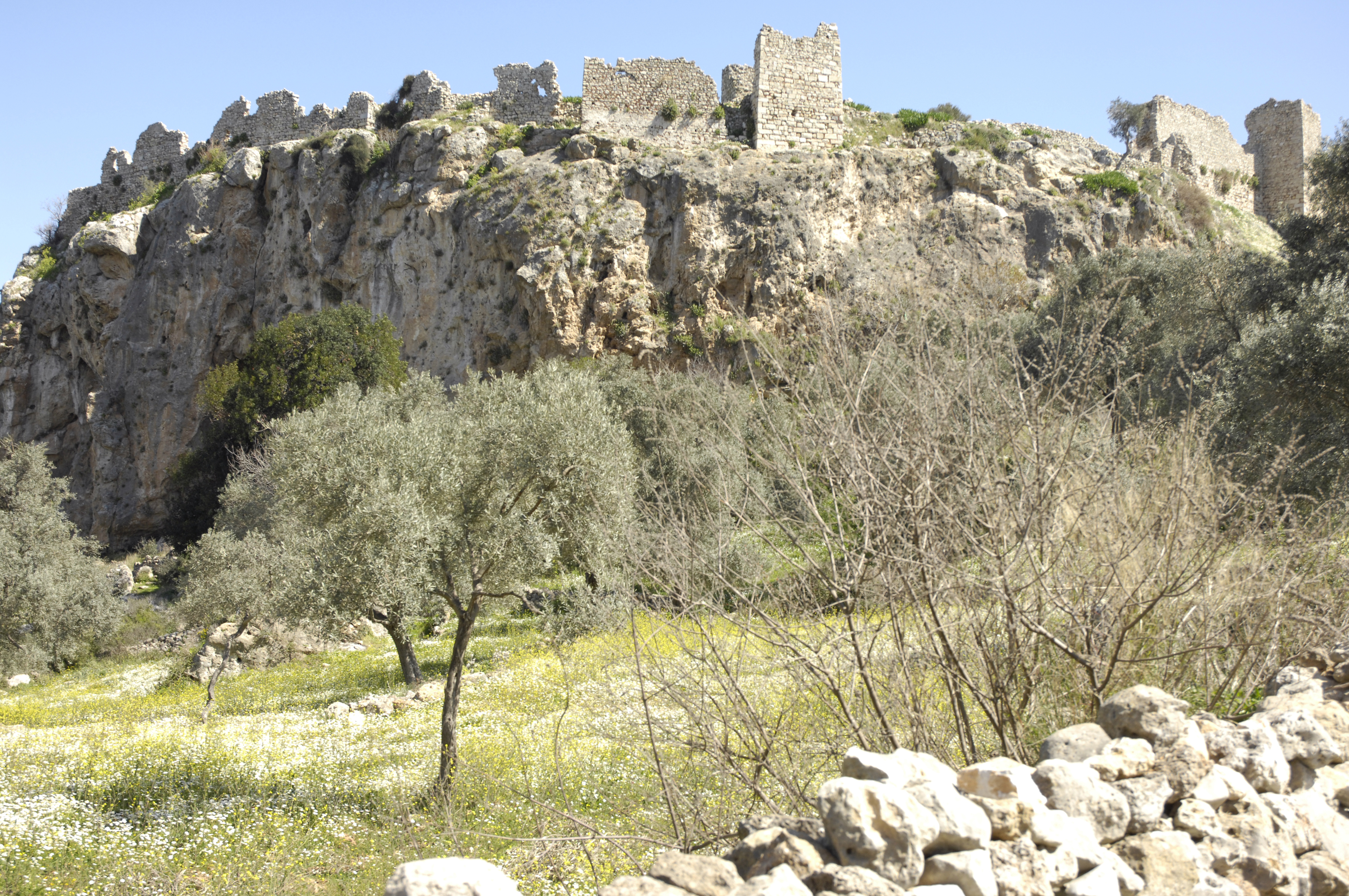
Beçin from below

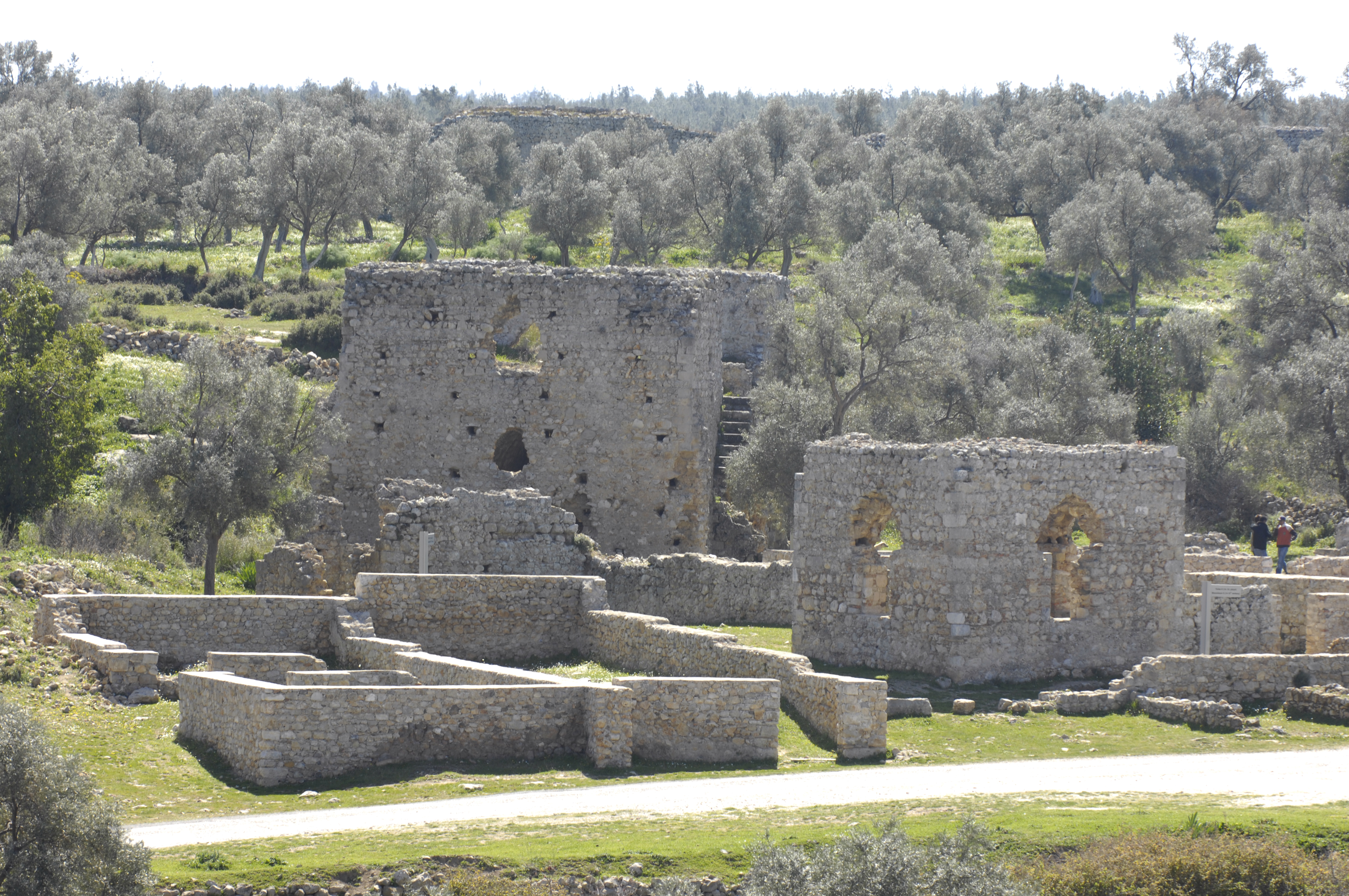
Beçin Kızıl Han

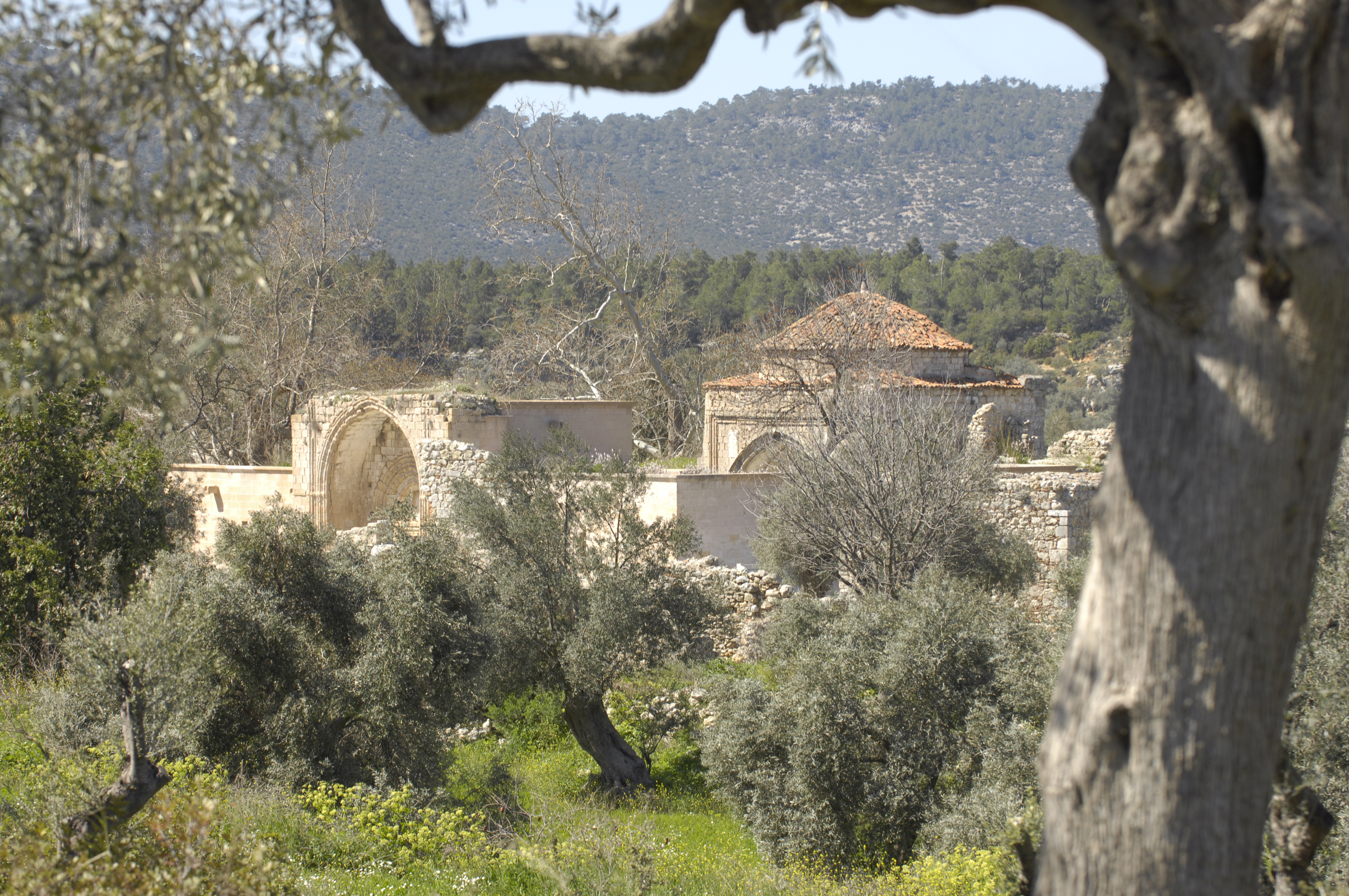
Beçin Ahmed Gazi medrese

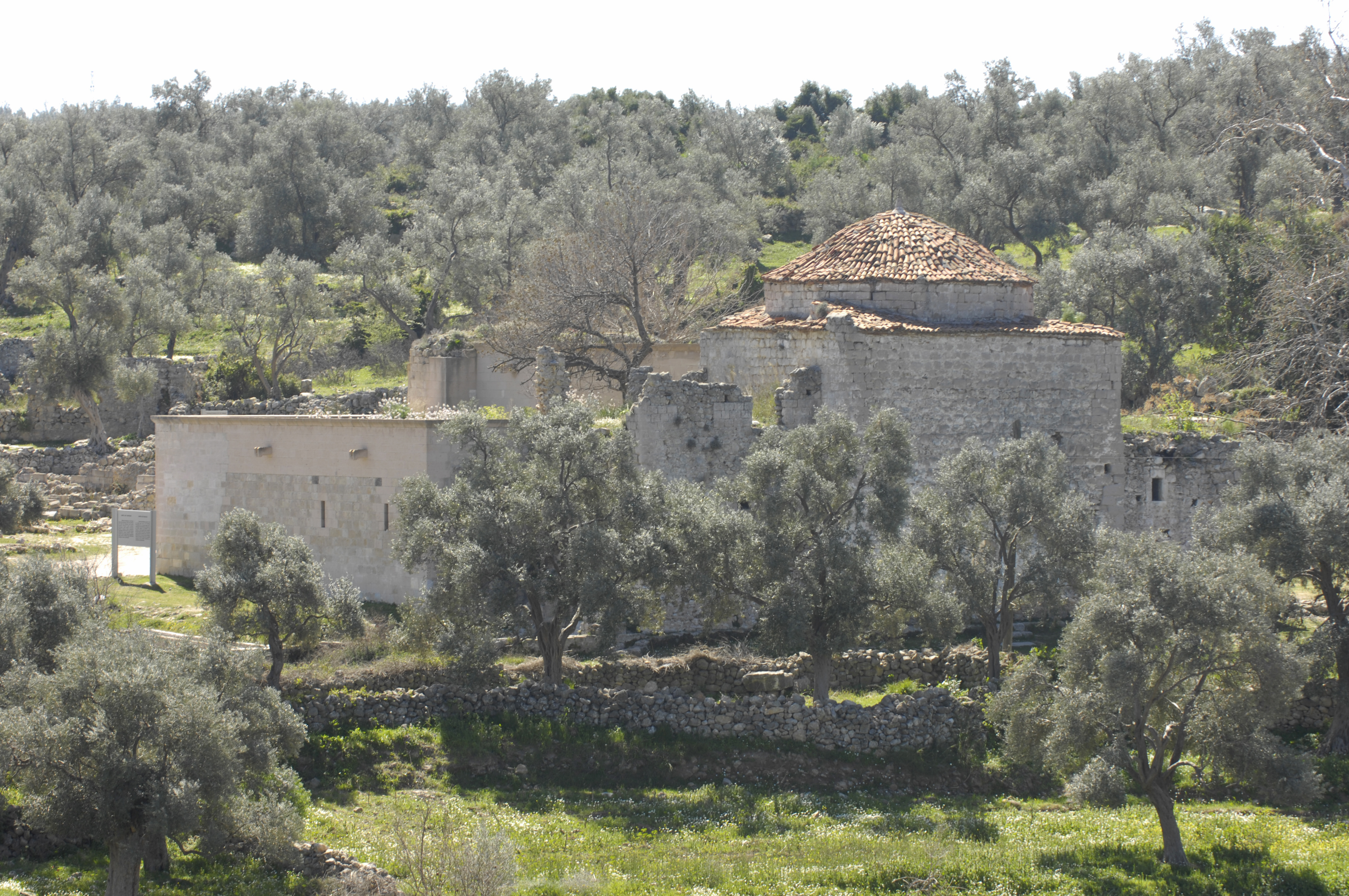
Beçin Ahmed Gazi medrese

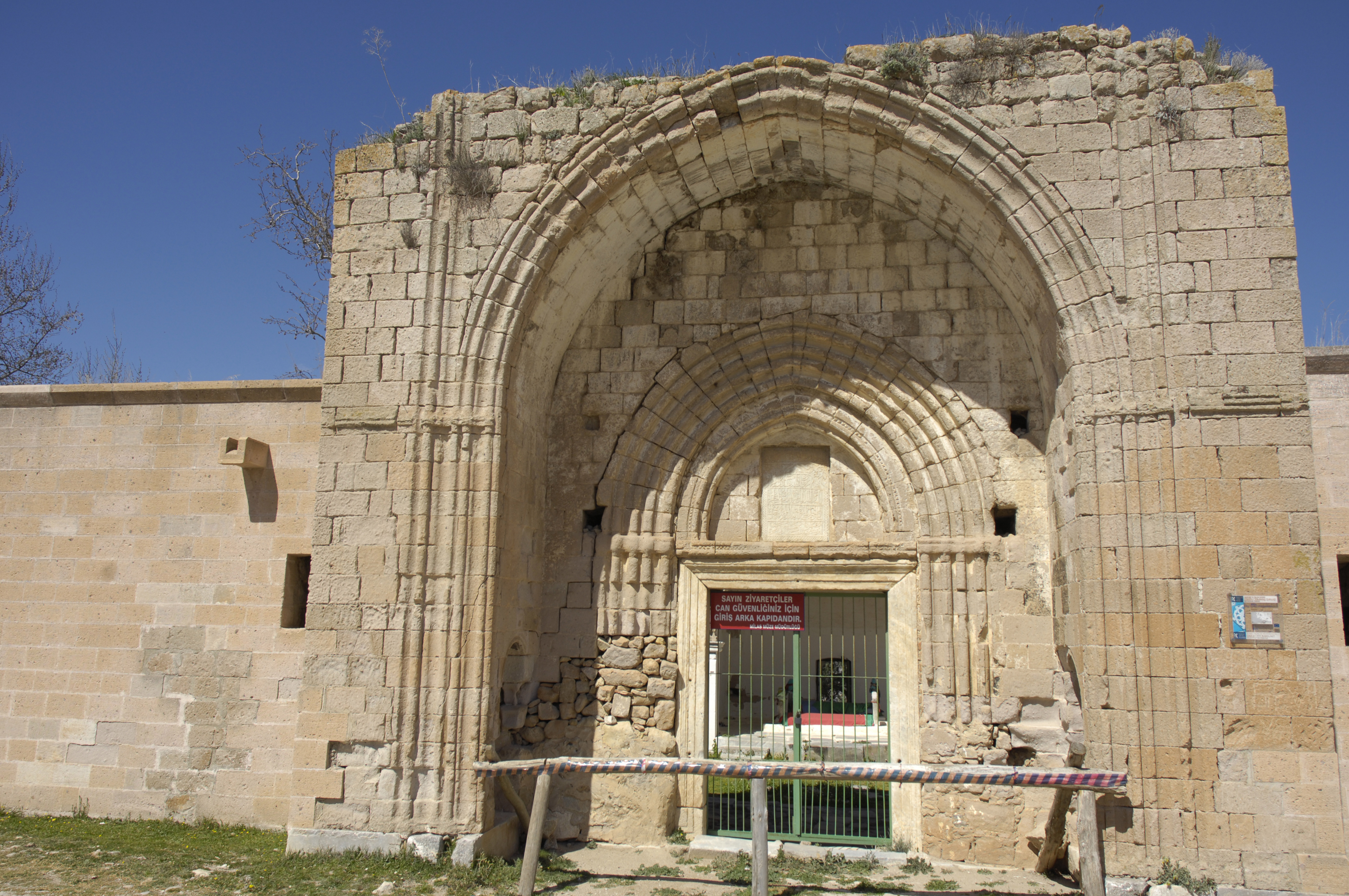
Beçin Ahmed Gazi Medrese entrance

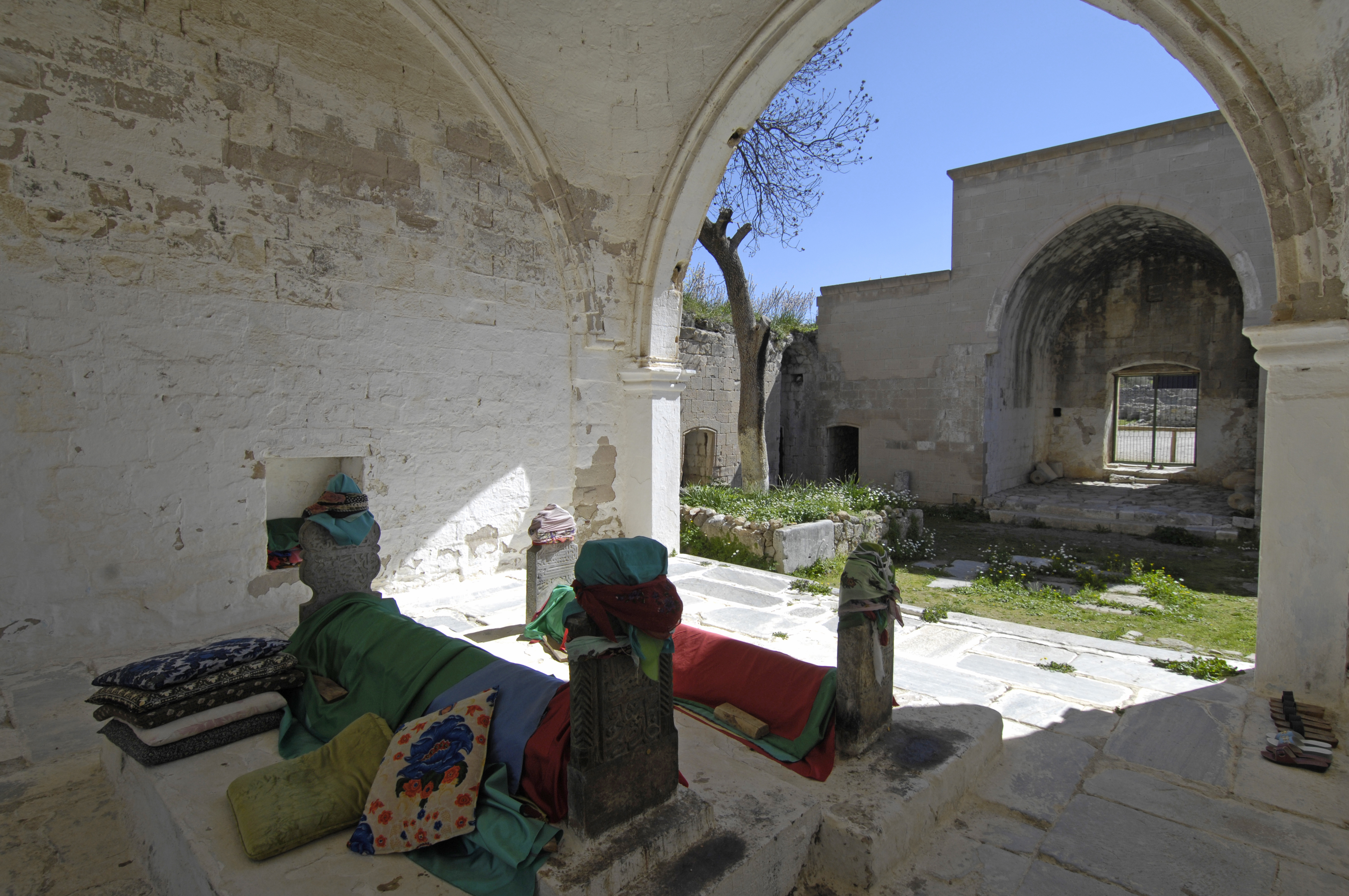
Beçin Ahmed Gazi Medrese Eyvan

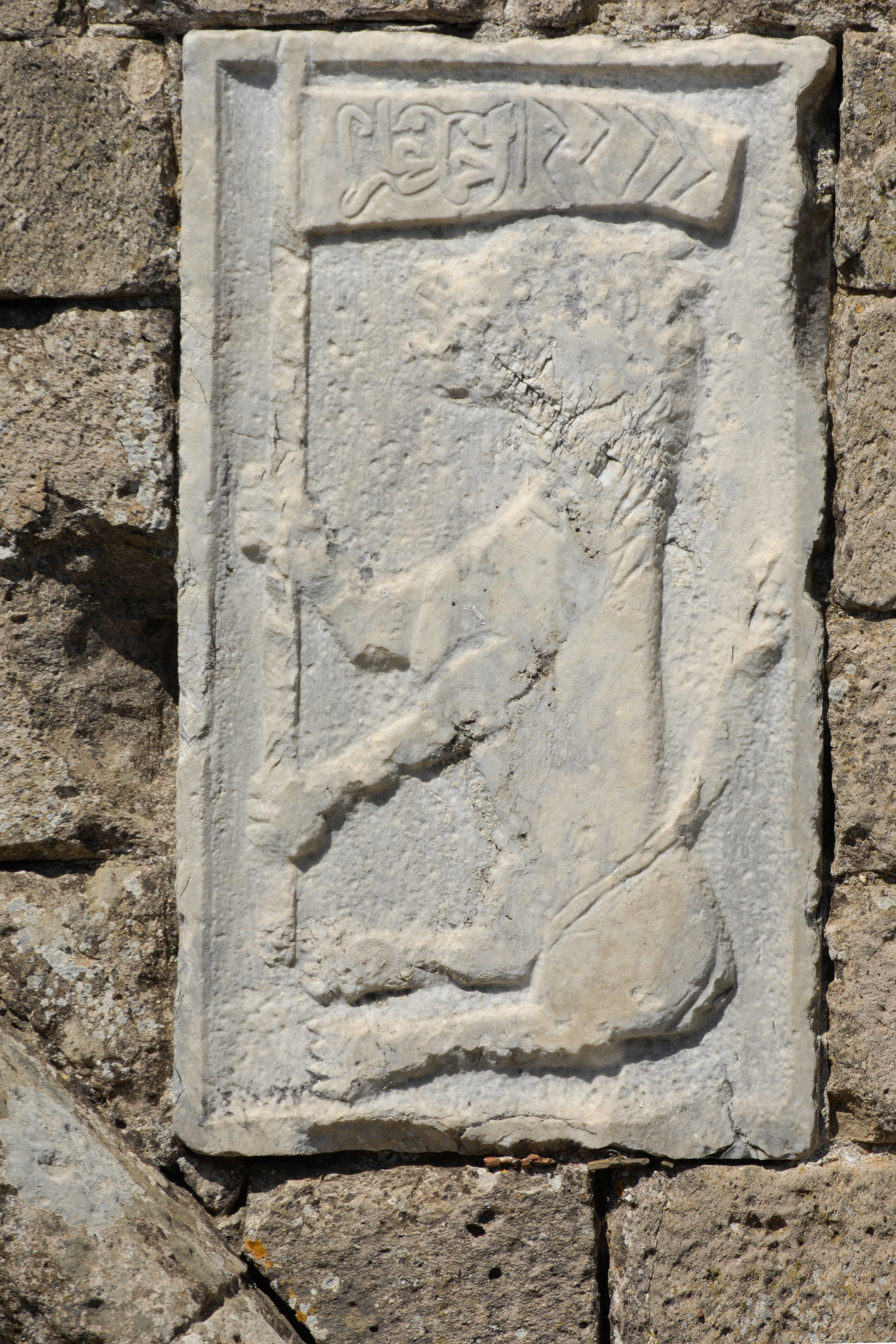
Beçin Ahmed Gazi Medrese banner

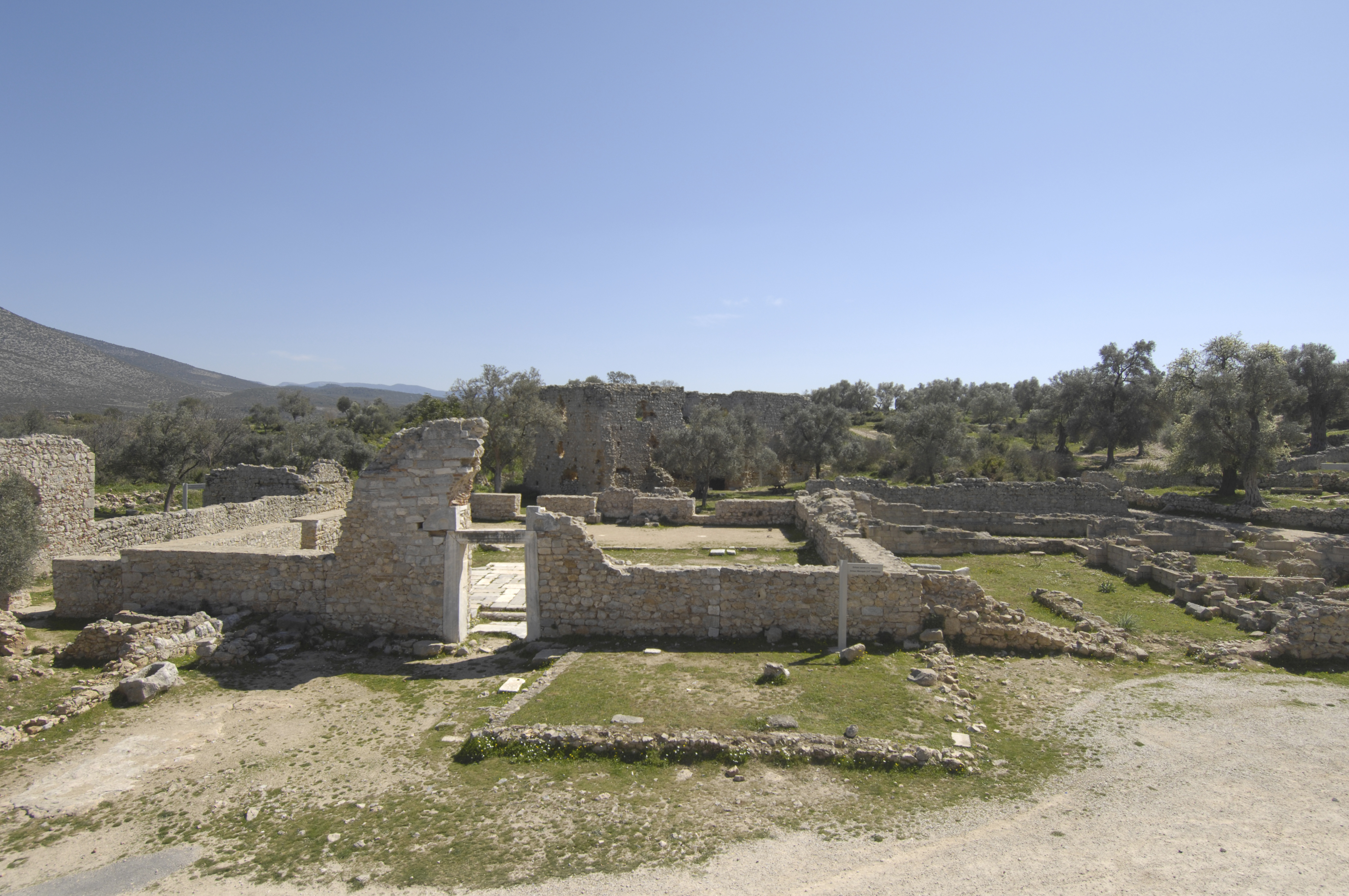
Beçin Orhan Bey mosque

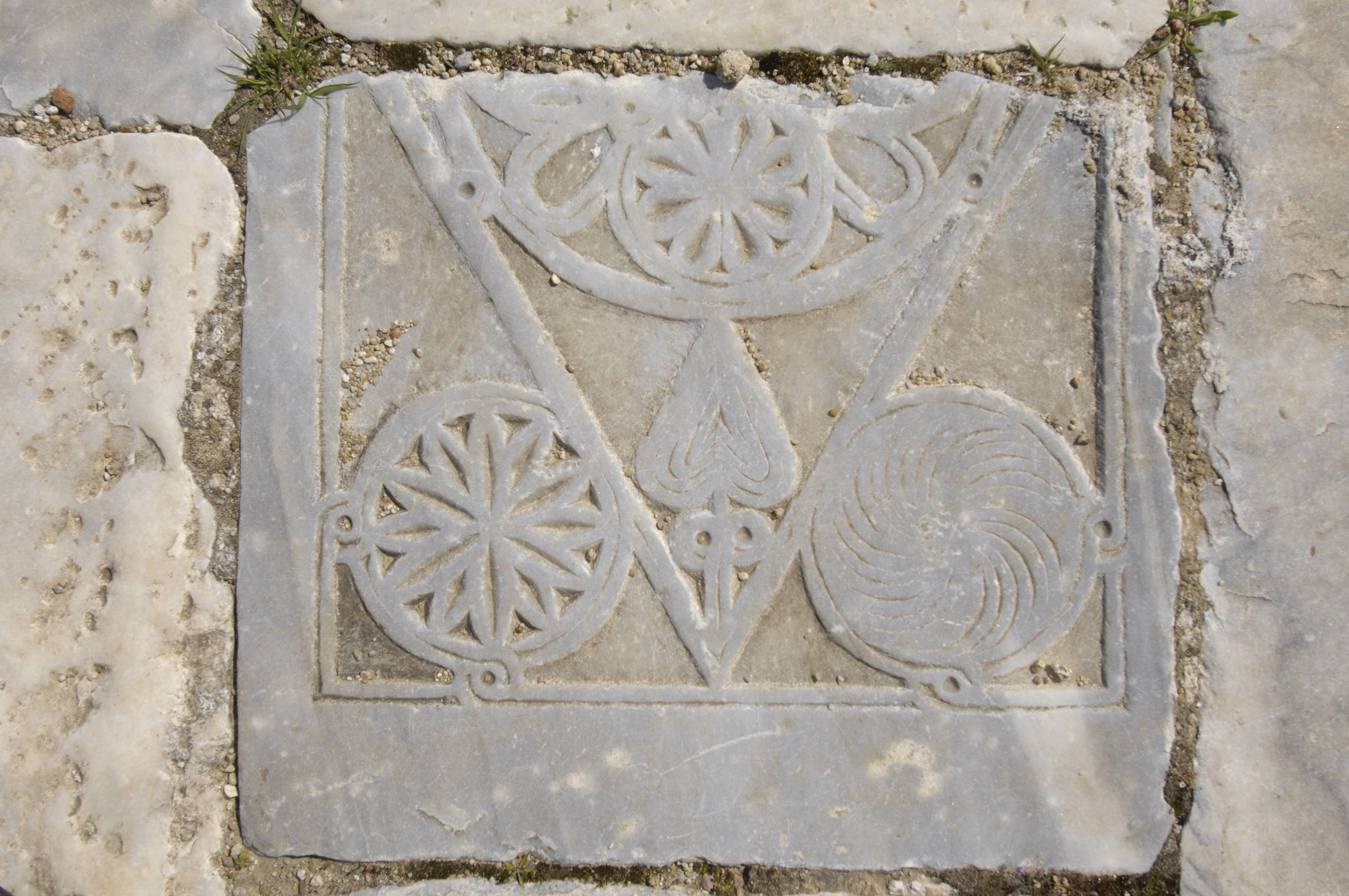
Beçin Orhan Bey Mosque detail

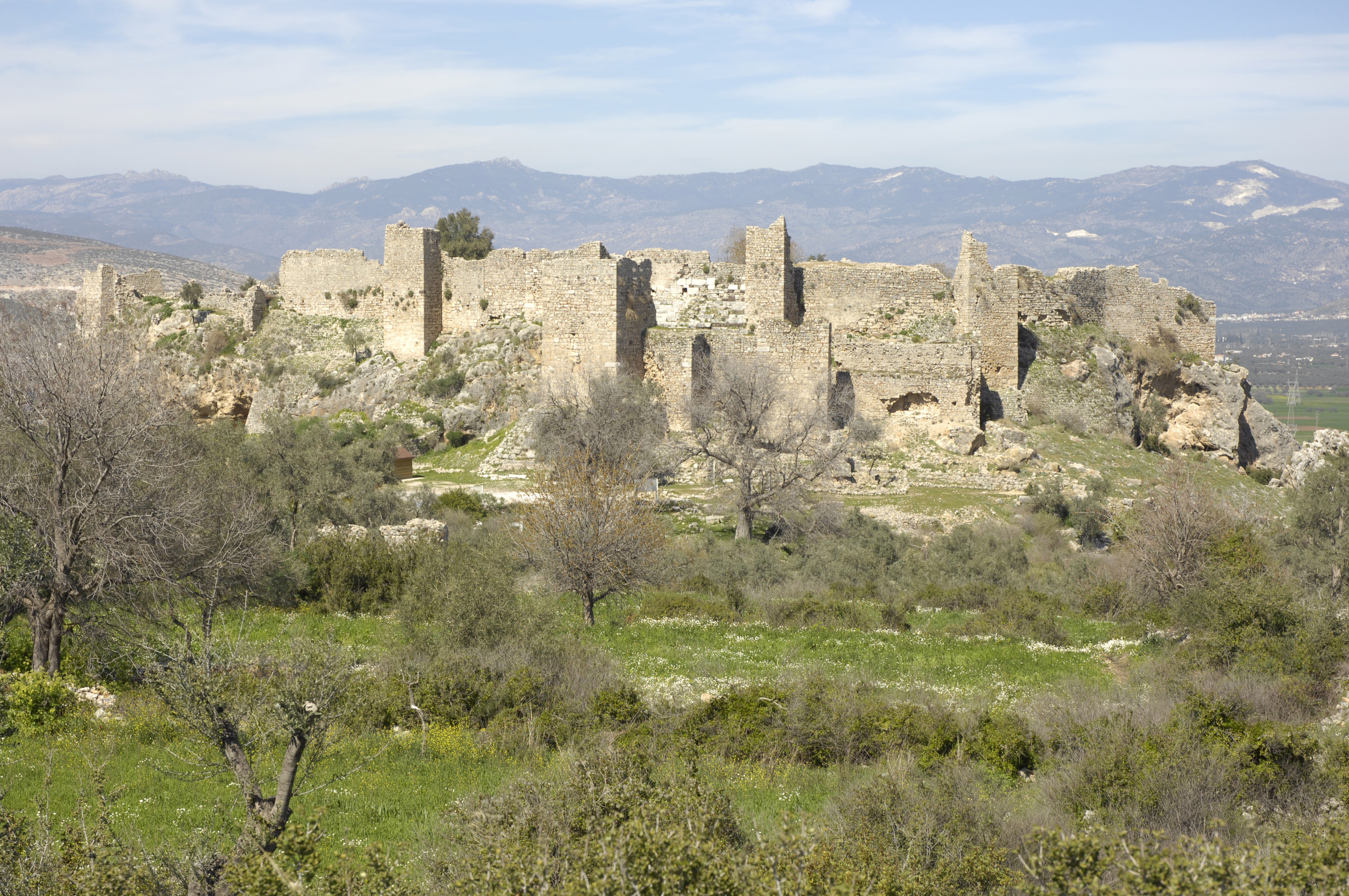
Beçin Castle from distance

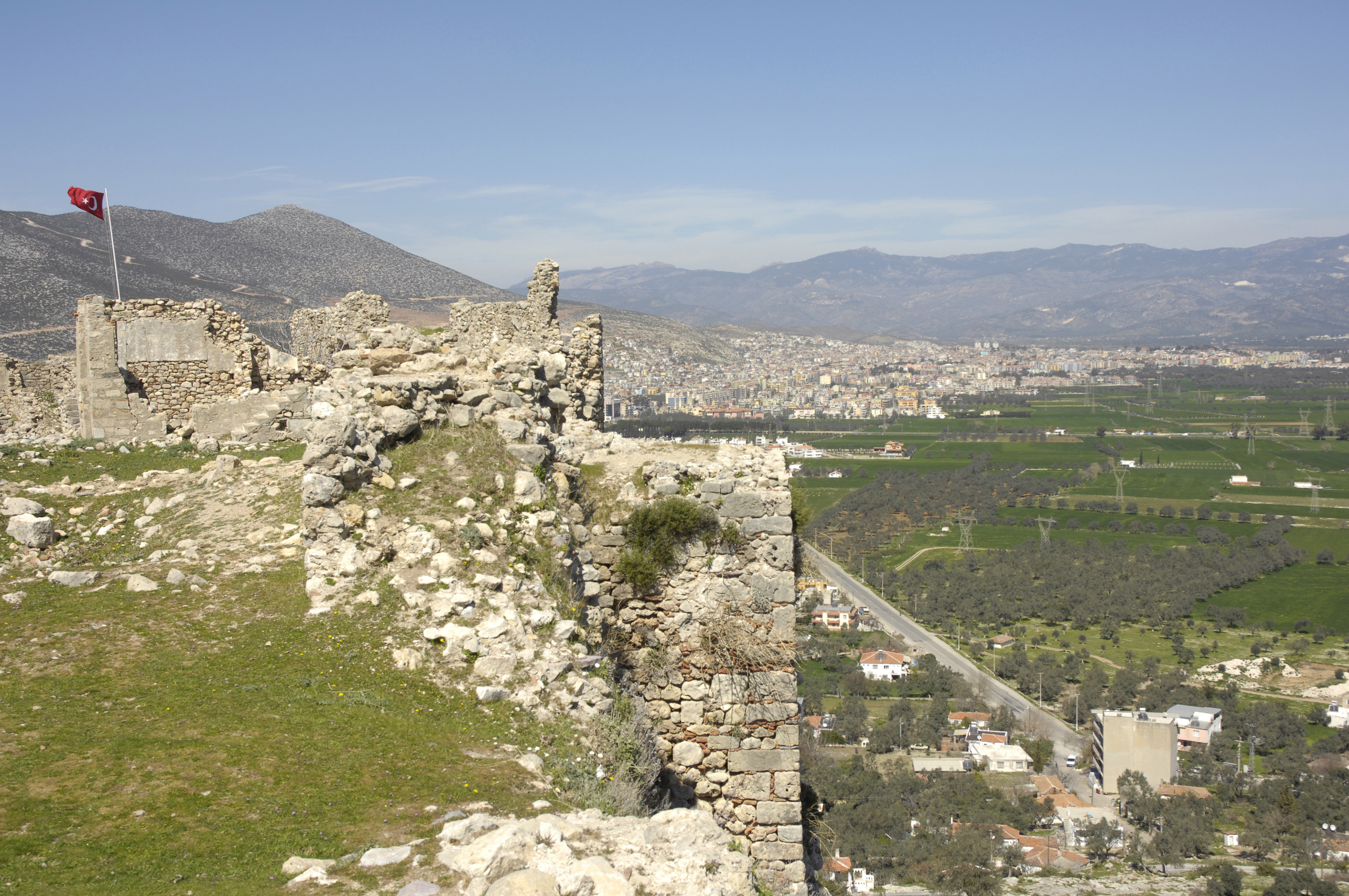
Beçin Castle

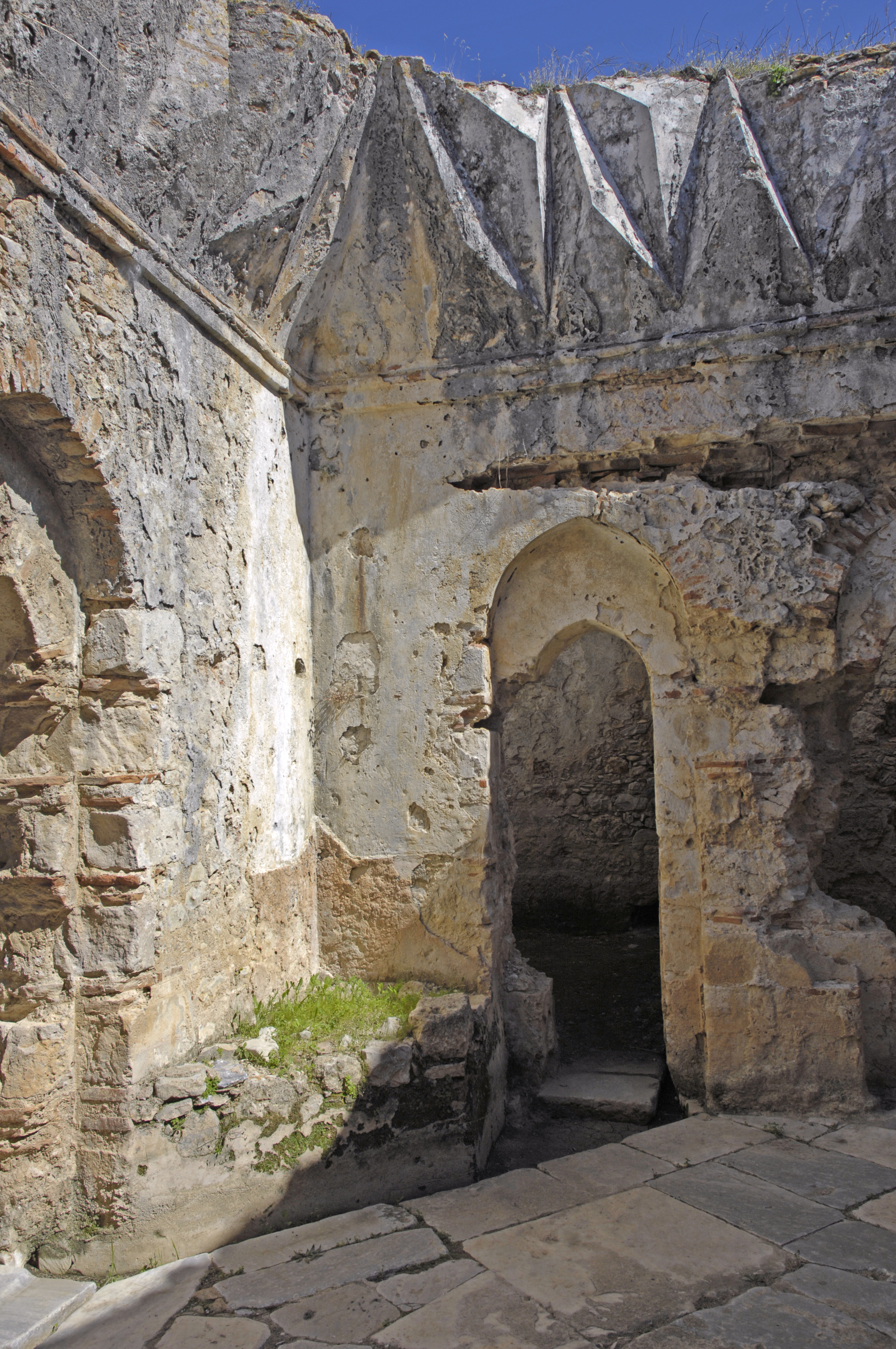
Beçin Big Bath

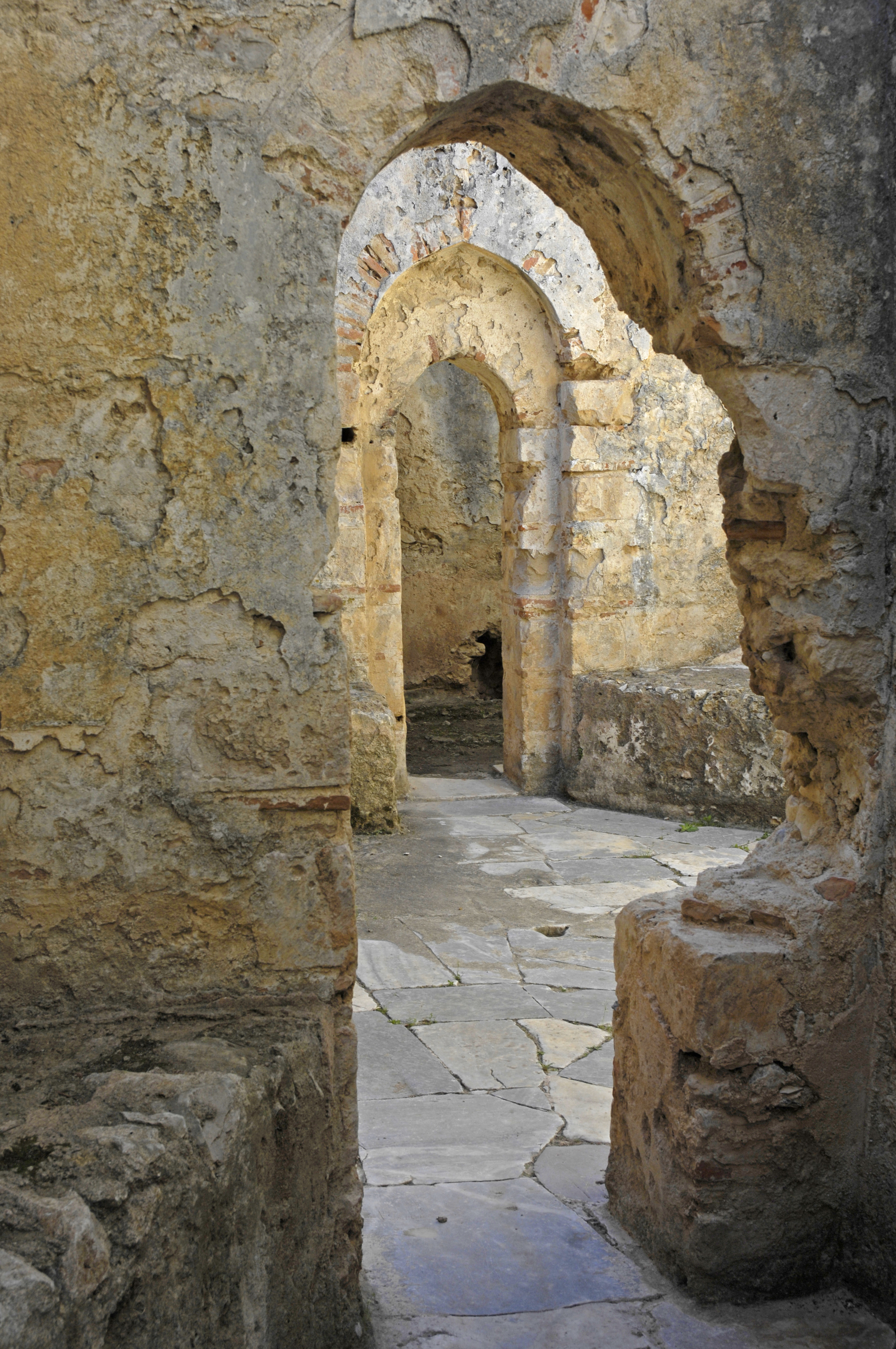
Beçin Big bath

== World Heritage Site status ==
The medieval city (both the fort and the village) was added to the tentative list in the cultural category of UNESCO World Heritage Site on April 13, 2012. Buildings such as Kızıl Han, Kara Paşa Han and Emir Courtyard, the Orman Lodge, the New Church and the Byzantine Chapel are among the archaeological remains. According to the Ministry of Culture, Beçin reflects the architecture of the beylik (mainly 14th century) era and the characteristics of the early Turkish settlements.
