= Anatolian beyliks =

Historical Turkish principalities in Anatolia

A map of independent Turkish beyliks in Anatolia during the 14th century

Anatolian beyliks (Turkish: Anadolu beylikleri, Ottoman Turkish: Tavâif-i mülûk, Beylik; Turkish pronunciation: [bejlik]) were Turkish principalities in Anatolia governed by beys, the first of which were founded at the end of the 11th century. A second and more extensive period of establishment took place as a result of the decline of the Seljuq Sultanate of Rûm in the latter half of the 13th century.

One of the beyliks, that of the Osmanoğlu of the Kayı branch of Oghuz Turks, from its capital in Bursa completed its incorporation of the other beyliks to form the Ottoman Empire by the late 15th century.

The word beylik denotes a territory under the jurisdiction of a bey, equivalent to a duchy or principality in other parts of Europe.

== History ==
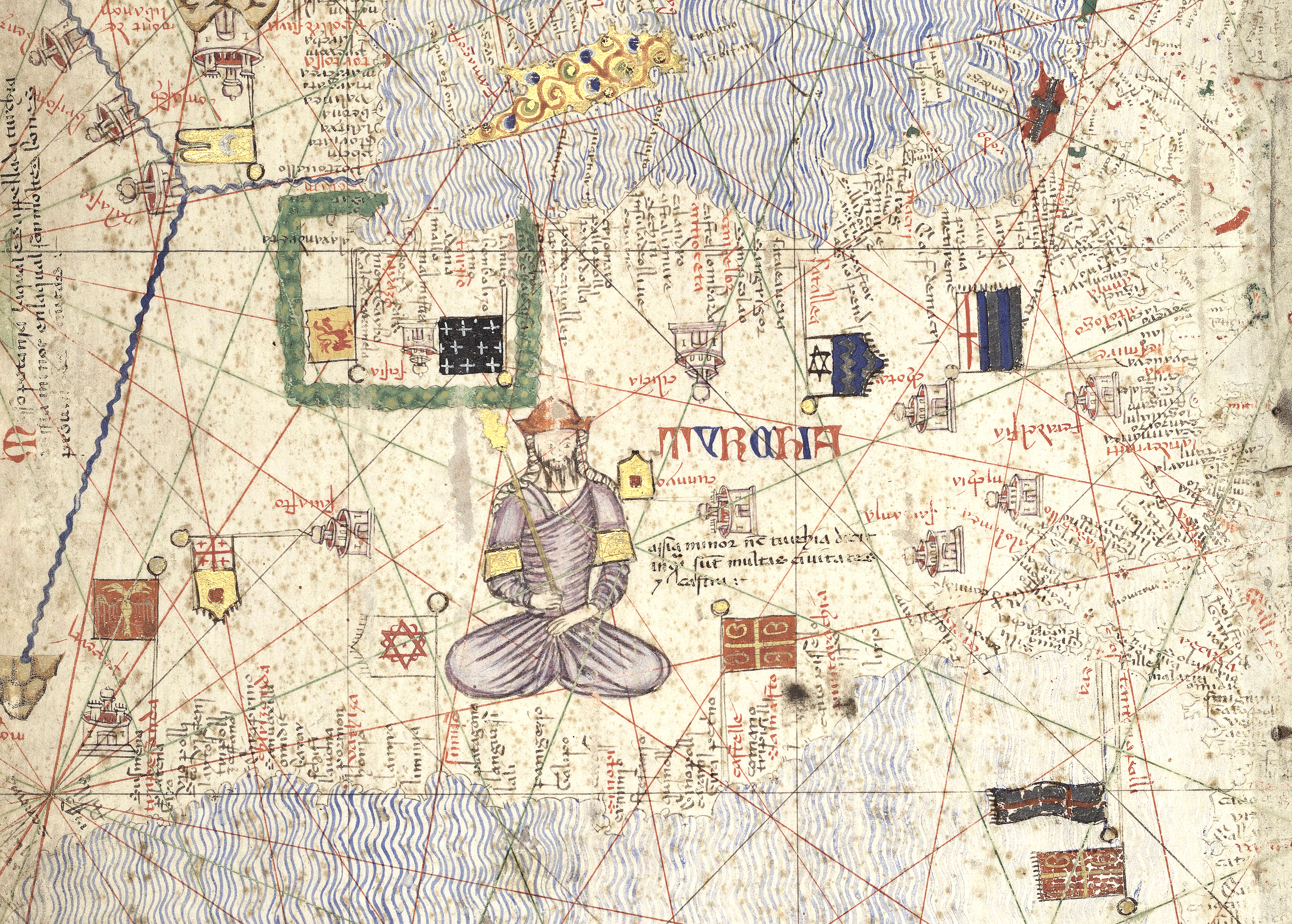
Anatolian Beyliks in the Catalan Atlas (1375). The caption next to the seated ruler reads: "Asia Minor also called Turkey, where there are many cities and castles." The map is shown upside down.

Following the 1071 Seljuk victory over the Byzantine Empire at the Battle of Manzikert and the subsequent conquest of Anatolia, Oghuz Turkic clans began settling in present-day Turkey. The Seljuk Sultanate of Rum's central power established in Konya was largely a result of using these clans under appointed beys called uç bey or uj begi (especially in border areas to ensure safety against the Byzantines); uç is a Turkish term that denotes a border or frontier territory equivalent to marches, with the similar term margrave used in other parts of Europe. These clans, led by beys, would receive military and financial support from the Seljuks in return for their fealty.

However, Mongol invasions from the East saw a decline in Seljuk power. The Ilkhanate commanders in Anatolia then gained strength and authority which encouraged the beys, who had until then been vassals to the Sultanate of Rum, to declare sovereignty over their dominions. With the fall of Seljuk centralized power in Konya, many beys joined forces with the atabegs (former Seljuk leaders), and other religious Muslim leaders, in addition to employing Ghazi warriors from Persia and Turkestan.

As the Byzantine Empire weakened, their cities in Asia Minor became gradually less and less able to resist these attacks, and many Turks began to settle in western parts of Anatolia. (Note: This process is described in the pioneering work, Speros Vryonis, The decline of medieval Hellenism in Asia Minor: and the process of Islamization from the eleventh through the fifteenth century (Berkeley: University of California, 1971), ISBN 978-1597404761.) As a result, many more beyliks were founded in these newly conquered realms, who engaged in power struggles with the Byzantines, the Genoese, the Knights Templar, as well as between each other.

By 1300, the Turks had reached the Aegean coastline, held momentarily two centuries before. In the beginning, the most powerful states were the Karamanids and the Germiyanids in the central area. The Beylik of Osmanoğlu, who would later go on to become the Ottoman Empire, was situated in the northwest, around Söğüt, and was at that stage relatively small and possessed modest military power. Along the Aegean coast, from North to South, were the principalities of Karasi, Saruhan, Aydin, Menteşe, and Teke. The Candar dynasty (later also known as Isfendiyar) reigned in the Black Sea region around the provinces of Kastamonu and Sinop in what was the Beylik of Candar.

The Anatolian Beyliks and main contemporary Asian polities circa 1300. A small Sultanate of Rum still existed as a vassal of the Ilkhanate.

Under its eponymous founder, Osman I, the Beylik of Osman expanded at Byzantine expense westwards and southwards of the Sea of Marmara in the first decades of the 14th century. With their annexation of the neighboring Beylik of Karasi and their advance into Rumelia starting in 1354, they soon gained strength to emerge as the principal rivals of the Beylik of Karaman, who at the time were thought to be the strongest. Towards the end of the 14th century, the Ottomans advanced further into Anatolia either through the acquisition of towns or by cementing marriage alliances. Meanwhile, wary of an increase in Ottoman regional power, the Karamanids repeatedly engaged in conflict with the Ottomans with the help of other beyliks, Mamluks, Aq Qoyunlu ("White Sheep Turkomans"), Byzantines, Pontics and Hungarians, failing and losing power every time. By the close of the century, the early Ottoman leaders had conquered large parts of land from Karamanids and other less prominent beyliks. These had a short respite when their territories were restored to them after the Ottoman defeat suffered against Tamerlane in 1402 in the Battle of Ankara.

But the Ottoman state quickly collected itself under Mehmed I and his son Murad II, who reincorporated most of these beyliks into Ottoman territory in a period of about 25 years. The final blow to the Beylik of Karaman was struck by Mehmed II, who conquered their lands and re-assured a homogeneous rule in Anatolia. The further steps towards a single rule by the Ottomans were taken by Selim I who conquered territories of the Beylik of Ramadan and the Beylik of Dulkadir in 1515 during his campaign against the Mamluk Sultanate, and his son Süleyman the Magnificent who more or less completely united the present territories of Turkey (and much more) in his 1534 campaign. Many of the former Anatolian beyliks subsequently became the basis for the administrative subdivisions in the Ottoman Empire.

== List of beyliks ==
=== Beyliks founded after Manzikert (1071) ===
In the list below, only the beyliks that were founded immediately after the Battle of Manzikert in 1071, mostly situated towards eastern Anatolia, and who were vassals (or sometimes at war) of the centralized power of the Seljuk Sultanate of Rum based in Konya are listed.

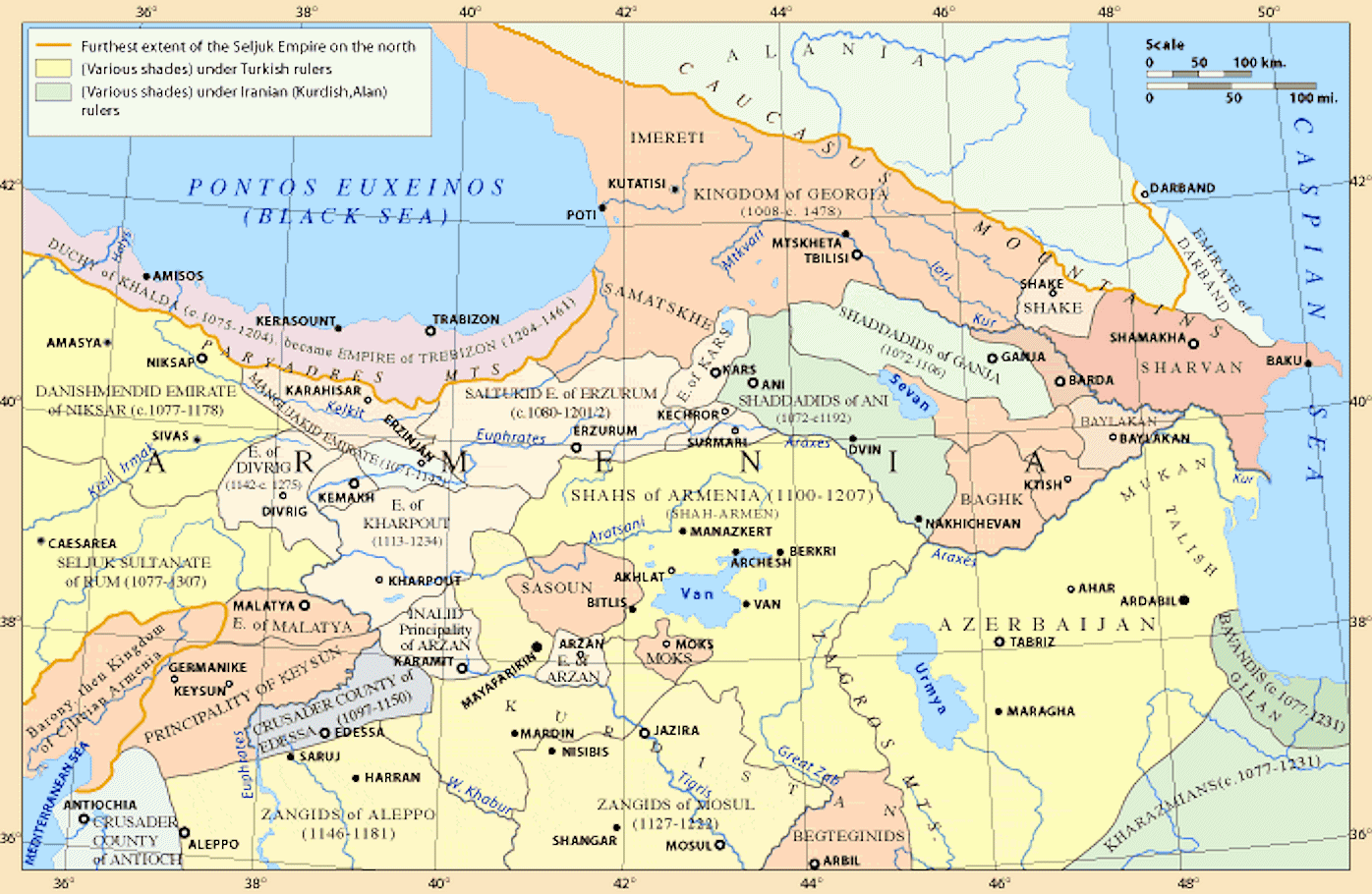
Map of the Anatolian beyliks in the 11th-12th centuries

Founded after the Battle of Manzikert
Name	Capital city	Duration of rule
Beylik of Smyrna	İzmir	1081–1098
Shah-Armens (also called Ahlatshahs)	Ahlat	1110–1207
Artuqids (three branches)	Hasankeyf, Mardin, Harput	1102–1409
Danishmend	Sivas	1071–1178
Dilmaçoğlu	Bitlis	1085–1398
İnaloğlu	Diyarbekir	1095–1183
Mengujekids	Erzincan, later Divriği	1072–1277
Saltukids	Erzurum	1072–1202
Çubukoğulları	Harput	1085–1112
Beylik of Tanrıbermiş	Alaşehir	1071–1098

=== Beyliks founded after Köse Dağ (1243) ===
A second group beyliks emerged as a result of the weakening of this central state under the Mongol blow with the Battle of Köse Dağ in 1243, which had the indirect consequence of extending Turkic territory in western Anatolia toward the end of the 13th century.

Founded after the Battle of Köse Dağ
Beylik's name	Capital city	Founder	Duration of rule
Ahi Brotherhood (Note: The Ahi Beylik is sometimes considered one of the Anatolian beyliks but was a mercantile republic rather than a monarchical dynasty. See Ahiler for more information.)	Ankara	Ahi Evren	c. 1290–1362
Beylik of Alaiye	Alanya	Mecdüddin Mahmud	1293 – 1471
Beylik of Aydin	Birgi; Ayasluğ (Selçuk)	Muharizalsîn Gazi Mehmed Bey	1308 – 1426
Beyliks of Canik: Beylik of Bafra; Kubadoğulları Beylik; Emirate of Chalybia; Kutluşah Beylik; Emirate of Limnia; Taşanoğulları Beylik	Bafra: Bafra; Kubadoğulları: Samsun, Ladik; Chalybia: Mesudiye; Kutluşah: Amasya; Limnia: Niksar; Taşanoğulları: Merzifon	Kubadoğulları: Tâcüddîn Altunbaş; Chalybia: Koustouganes; Kutluşah: Hacı Kutluşah; Limnia: Tâcüddîn Bey; Triangular: Emir Taşan	Kubadoğulları: 1308 - 1422; Chalybia: 1301 - 1427; Kutluşah: 1340 - 1381; Limnia: 1360s – 1428; Taşanoğulları: ca. 1350 – 1430
Beylik of Candar (or Isfendiyar)	Eflani; Kastamonu; Sinop	Yaman Candar	1291 – 1461
Chobanid Beylik	Kastamonu	Husam al-Din Choban	1211 – 1309
Beylik of Dulkadir	Elbistan; Maraş	Zayn al-Din Qaraja	1348 – 1522
Beylik of Eretna	Sivas; Kayseri	Eretna	1335 – 1390
Beylik of Erzincan	Erzincan	Ahi Ayna	1379 – 1410
Eshrefid Beylik	Beyşehir	Suleyman ibn Eshref Bey	1285 – 1326
Beylik of Germiyan	Kütahya	Yakub I of Germiyan	1300 – 1429
Beylik of Hamid	Eğirdir	Felek al-Din Dündar	1300 – 1391
Qadi Burhanëddîn State	Sivas	Kadi Burhan al-Din	1381 – 1398
Beylik of Karaman	Larende (Karaman)	Nure Sofi	1250 – 1487
Karasid Beylik	Balıkesir; Bergama; Çanakkale	Karasi Bey	1296 – 1357
Beylik of Lâdik	Denizli	Mehmed Bey of Lâdik	1262 – 1391
Beylik of Menteşe	Milas	Menteşe Bey	1261 – 1424
Ottoman Beylik (later Ottoman Empire)	Söğüt; Bursa; Nicaea; Edirne; Istanbul	Osman I	1299 – 1 November 1922
Pervâneid Beylik	Sinop	Muînüddin Mehmed ibn Parwana	1277 – 1322
Ramadanid Emirate	Adana	Ramazan Bey	1352 – 1608
Beylik of Sahib Ata	Afyonkarahisar	Taceddin Hüseyin and Nusreddin Hasan	1275 – 1341
Beylik of Sarukhan	Manisa	Sarukhan Bey	1300 – 1410
Beylik of Teke	Antalya; Korkuteli	Yunus Bey	1321 – 1423

== Society ==
=== Language ===
Combined with the Seljuks and the migration of Turkic tribes into the Anatolian mainland, the Anatolian beyliks spread the Turkic language and Islamic culture in Anatolia. Unlike the Seljuks, whose administrative language was Persian, the Anatolian beyliks adopted spoken Turkic as their formal literary language. The Turkish language thus achieved widespread use in these principalities and reached its highest sophistication during the Ottoman era.

=== Art ===
In spite of their limited sources and the political climate of their era, art during the Anatolian beyliks flourished, probably forming the basis for Ottoman art. Although the artistic style of the Anatolian beyliks can be considered as representatives of a transition period between Seljuks and Ottomans, new trends were also acquired. Especially wandering traditional crafts artists and architects helped spread these new trends and localized styles to several beyliks across Anatolia, which resulted in innovative and original works particularly in architecture. Wood and stone carving, clay tiles and other similar decorative arts of the Seljuks were still used, however with the influence of the pursuit for new spaces and its reflections in other arts as well.

=== Architecture ===
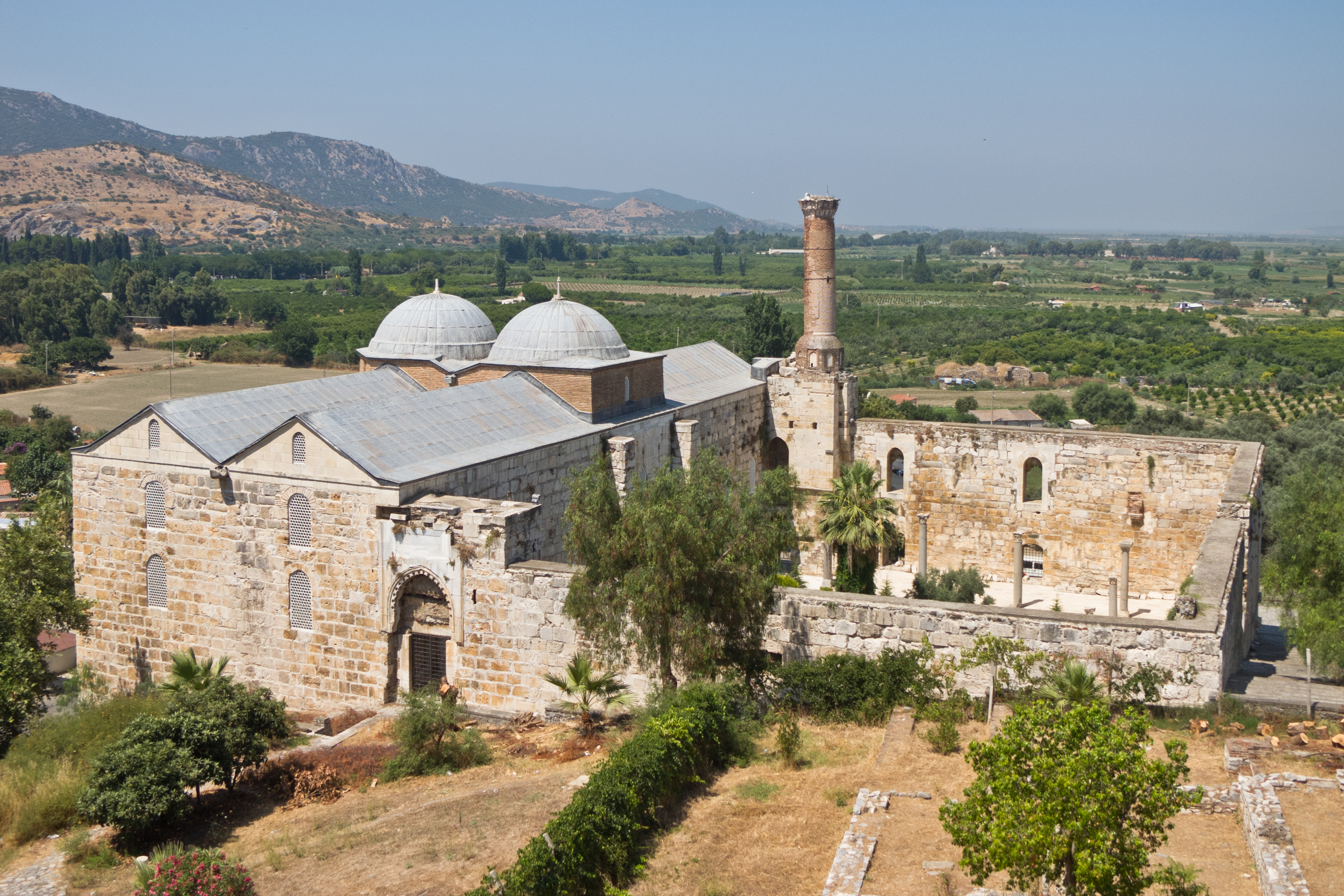
İsa Bey Mosque in Selçuk near İzmir, built by the Beylik of Aydınids in 1375.

Some representative examples of the Anatolian beyliks' architecture are İlyas Bey Mosque at Balat (Milet) (1404), İsabey Mosque at Selçuk (1375), Ulucami Mosque at Birgi (1312) built by the Aydın beylik. The above mosques, although being successors of Seljuq architecture, differ greatly in the increase of decorations in the interior and exterior spaces and the different placement of the courtyards and minarets. Karaman beylik also left noteworthy architectural works, such as Ulucami Mosque in Ermenek (1302), Hatuniye Madrassa in Karaman (1382), Akmedrese Madrassa in Niğde (1409), all of which respect a new style that considers and incorporates the exterior surroundings also. One of the first examples of the Anatolian beylik architecture hinting at the forming of the Ottoman architecture that aims at uniting the interior space beneath one big dome and forming a monumental architectural structure is Ulucami Mosque in Manisa (1374) built by the Saruhan beylik. Also worth noting is the increase in constructions of madrassas that points at the beyliks' attaching greater importance to sciences.

== See also ==
- History of Turkey
- Taifa

== Sources ==
- Howard, Douglas A. (2016). The History of Turkey (2nd ed.). Santa Barbara, California: Greenwood. ISBN 978-1-4408-3466-0.
- Mehmet Fuat Köprülü (translated by Gary Leiser) (1992). The Origins of the Ottoman Empire. State University of New York Press. ISBN 0-7914-0819-1. (limited preview)
- Westermann Großer Atlas zur Weltgeschichte (in German)
