= Bəylik =

Bəylik may refer to:

- Bəylik, Agdash, Azerbaijan
- Bəylik, Lachin, Azerbaijan
- Bəylik, Saatly, Azerbaijan

== See also ==
- Beylik (disambiguation)
