= Taj al-Din Chelebi =

Beg of Limnia from 1367 to 1386

Beg of Limnia
- Predecessor: Doghan Shah
- Successor: Mahmud Chelebi
- Spouse: Eudokia of Trebizond (m. 1379)
- Issue: Alp Arslan; Mahmud Chelebi; Suleiman; Altamur Chelebi
- Father: Doghan Shah
- Religion: Islam

Taj al-Din Chelebi (Medieval Greek: Τζαλαπής Τατζιατίνης; died 24 October 1386) was Beg of Limnia in northeastern Anatolia from 1367 until his death.

== Early life and background ==
A theory on Taj al-Din's origin connects him to the Seljuk dynasty. His father was Emir Doghan Shah, a Turkmen ruler who refused to come under the authority of Eretna (r. 1335–52) and captured Amasya. Doghan Shah was repelled from the region in 1341 and retreated to Niksar, which would become the state's capital. He died in 1346 or 1348, and his son Taj al-Din inherited the rule.

== Reign ==
Taj al-Din was initially bound to the ruler of Amasya, Shadgeldi, and paid an annual tax to the Eretnids. In the spring of 1379, when the Eretnid vizier Kadi Burhan al-Din attempted to increase his sphere of influence by attacking Niksar together with the sultan Ala al-Din Ali (r. 1366–80), Taj al-Din fended them off and discontinued the annual payment, exercising further autonomy or independence from them. He parried a second Eretnid campaign with the help of Shadgeldi. However, he and Shadgeldi were defeated in 1381. The same year, Kadi Burhan al-Din ended the Eretnid dynasty's rule and claimed the title sultan instead. Taj al-Din then ransacked Akshehir (Erzincan) with the Emir of Tokat, Sayiddi Husam.

In an effort to forge friendly relations with him, Alexios III of Trebizond (r. 1349–90) married his daughter Eudokia. On 8 October 1379, Alexios III brought his daughter with the dowry to Oeneon, where the marriage took place.

== Bibliography ==
- Bryer, Anthony (1975). "Greeks and Türkmens: The Pontic Exception". Dumbarton Oaks Papers. 29: 113–148. doi:10.2307/1291371. ISSN 0070-7546. JSTOR 1291371.
- Demir, Necati (2012). "Orta ve Doğu Karadeniz Bölgesinde Çepni Türkmenleri ile Güvenç Abdal Ocağı'nın Kuruluşu" (PDF). Türk Kültürü ve Hacı Bektaş Veli Araştırmaları Dergisi (in Turkish) (63): 77–110. ISSN 2147-9895.
- Kofoğlu, Sait (2010). "Tâceddinoğulları". TDV Encyclopedia of Islam, Vol. 39 (Şeri̇f Paşa – Tanzanya) (in Turkish). Istanbul: Presidency of Religious Affairs, Centre for Islamic Studies. pp. 343–345. ISBN 978-975-389-632-0.
