= Hajji Amir =

Beg of Chalybia from 1356 to 1364

Beg of Chalybia
- Reign: 1356 – 1364
- Predecessor: Bayram
- Successor: Suleiman
- Spouse: Theodora
- Father: Bayram
- Religion: Islam

Hajji Amir Ibrahim Beg (Medieval Greek: Χατζυμύρις) was the ruler of Chalybia in northeastern Anatolia from 1356 to 1364.

== Bibliography ==
- Bryer, Anthony (1975). "Greeks and Türkmens: The Pontic Exception". Dumbarton Oaks Papers. 29: 113–148. doi:10.2307/1291371. ISSN 0070-7546. JSTOR 1291371.
- Demir, Necati (2012). "Orta ve Doğu Karadeniz Bölgesinde Çepni Türkmenleri ile Güvenç Abdal Ocağı'nın Kuruluşu" (PDF). Türk Kültürü ve Hacı Bektaş Veli Araştırmaları Dergisi (in Turkish) (63): 77–110. ISSN 2147-9895.
