= Beylik of Bafra =

Beylik of Canik (c. 1300 – 1460)

Beylik of Bafra Bafra Beyliği
- 14th century–1460
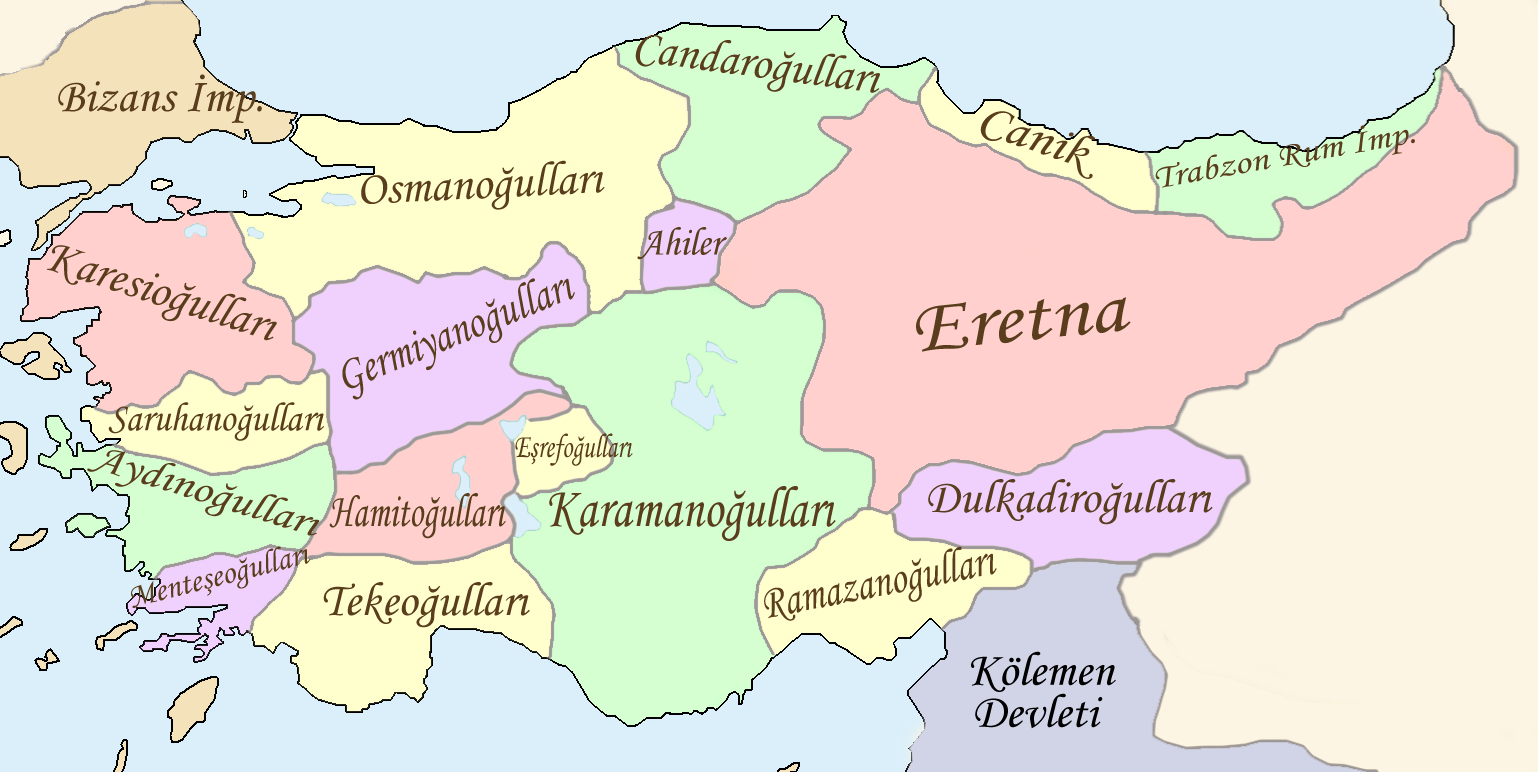
- Shown as Canik, Center-east Black Sea coast, yellow
- Capital: Bafra
- Common languages: Turkish
- Religion: Sunni Islam
- Government: Emirate
- Bey
- History
  - Collapse of the Sultanate of Rum: 14th century
- 1460
  - Annexation by the Ottoman Empire: 1460
Preceded by	Succeeded by
Sultanate of Rum	Ottoman Empire
- Today part of: Turkey

The Beylik of Bafra was one of the Beyliks of Canik (Turkish: Canik beylikleri), a group of small Turkmen principalities in northern Anatolia during the 14th and 15th centuries.

In 1460 the beylik of Bafra became a part of the Ottoman Empire.

== See also ==
- Anatolian beyliks
- Beyliks of Canik
