= Suleiman of Chalybia =

Beg of Chalybia

Suleiman Beg

Beg of Chalybia
- Predecessor: Hajji Amir
- Spouse: Daughter of Alexios III of Trebizond
- Father: Hajji Amir
- Religion: Islam

Suleiman Beg (fl. 1386–96) was the ruler of Chalybia in northeastern Anatolia.

== Bibliography ==
- Bryer, Anthony (1975). "Greeks and Türkmens: The Pontic Exception". Dumbarton Oaks Papers. 29: 113–148. doi:10.2307/1291371. ISSN 0070-7546. JSTOR 1291371.
- Demir, Necati (2012). "Orta ve Doğu Karadeniz Bölgesinde Çepni Türkmenleri ile Güvenç Abdal Ocağı'nın Kuruluşu" (PDF). Türk Kültürü ve Hacı Bektaş Veli Araştırmaları Dergisi (in Turkish) (63): 77–110. ISSN 2147-9895.
