= Koustouganes =

Beg of Chalybia

Beg of Chalybia
- Successor: Bayram
- Issue: Bayram
- Religion: Islam

Koustouganes (Medieval Greek: Κουστουγάνης) was a Turkmen chieftain who was the earliest known head of the Emirate of Chalybia. He first appeared in records when he attacked the town of Kerasous in 1301.

== Name ==
The original version of the name Koustouganes (Medieval Greek: Κουστουγάνης) is a matter of dispute. Historian Anthony Bryer connected it with the name Küçük Ağa (lit. 'little agha'). Elizabeth Zachariadou suggested it was Küçdoğan. According to Necati Demir, the original form was Kuştoğan, which echoes in the toponyms of the region. The fortress of Kuşdoğan stands 36 kilometers from Giresun, nestled 4 kilometers to the north of Dereli. Tahrir defters from 1515 and 1530 refer to the village surrounding Kuşdoğan Castle as Kuştoğan. Similarly, Kuştoğan village, currently known as Kuşluhan, is situated approximately 5.5 kilometers north of Bulancak. Records from 1455 additionally list the villages of Kuşdoğan (currently a neighborhood of Gölköy District known as Kuşluvan) within the Niyabet-i Hafsamana, and the village of Kuştoğan (presently a neighborhood of Tepeköy) under the Nahiye-i Niyabet-i Gerish-i Ihtiyar. Additionally, within the Janik sanjak, Kuştoğan village (part of present-day Ünye District) was documented within the Satilmish nahiye.

== Life ==
Koustouganes first appeared in records when he attacked the town of Kerasous in 1301. Emperor Alexios II of Trebizond (r. 1297–1330) "deadened his pride" by restoring the city's fortifications. Koustouganes attacked from the western direction, a region that houses almost no monuments from his era and where mountains come perpendicular to the coastline. The region under the influence of Koustouganes spanned from Oeneion to Kerasous. While his death date and burial site are unknown, a damaged kumbet (tomb) in the village of Kale, Mesudiye possibly belongs to him.

== Bibliography ==
- Bryer, Anthony (1975). "Greeks and Türkmens: The Pontic Exception". Dumbarton Oaks Papers. 29: 113–148. ISSN 0070-7546.
- Demir, Necati (2012). "Orta ve Doğu Karadeniz Bölgesinde Çepni Türkmenleri ile Güvenç Abdal Ocağı'nın Kuruluşu" (PDF). Türk Kültürü ve Hacı Bektaş Veli Araştırmaları Dergisi (in Turkish) (63): 77–110. ISSN 2147-9895.
- Shukurov, Rustam (June 1994). "Between Peace and Hostility: Trebizond and the Pontic Turkish Periphery in the Fourteenth Century". Mediterranean Historical Review. 9 (1). Routledge: 20–72. doi:10.1080/09518969408569663. ISSN 0951-8967.
- Zachariadou, Elizabeth (1985). Romania and the Turks, C.1300-c.1500. Variorum Reprints. ISBN 9780860781592. OCLC 12525542.
