= İlyas Bey Mosque =

Mosque in Aydın, Turkey

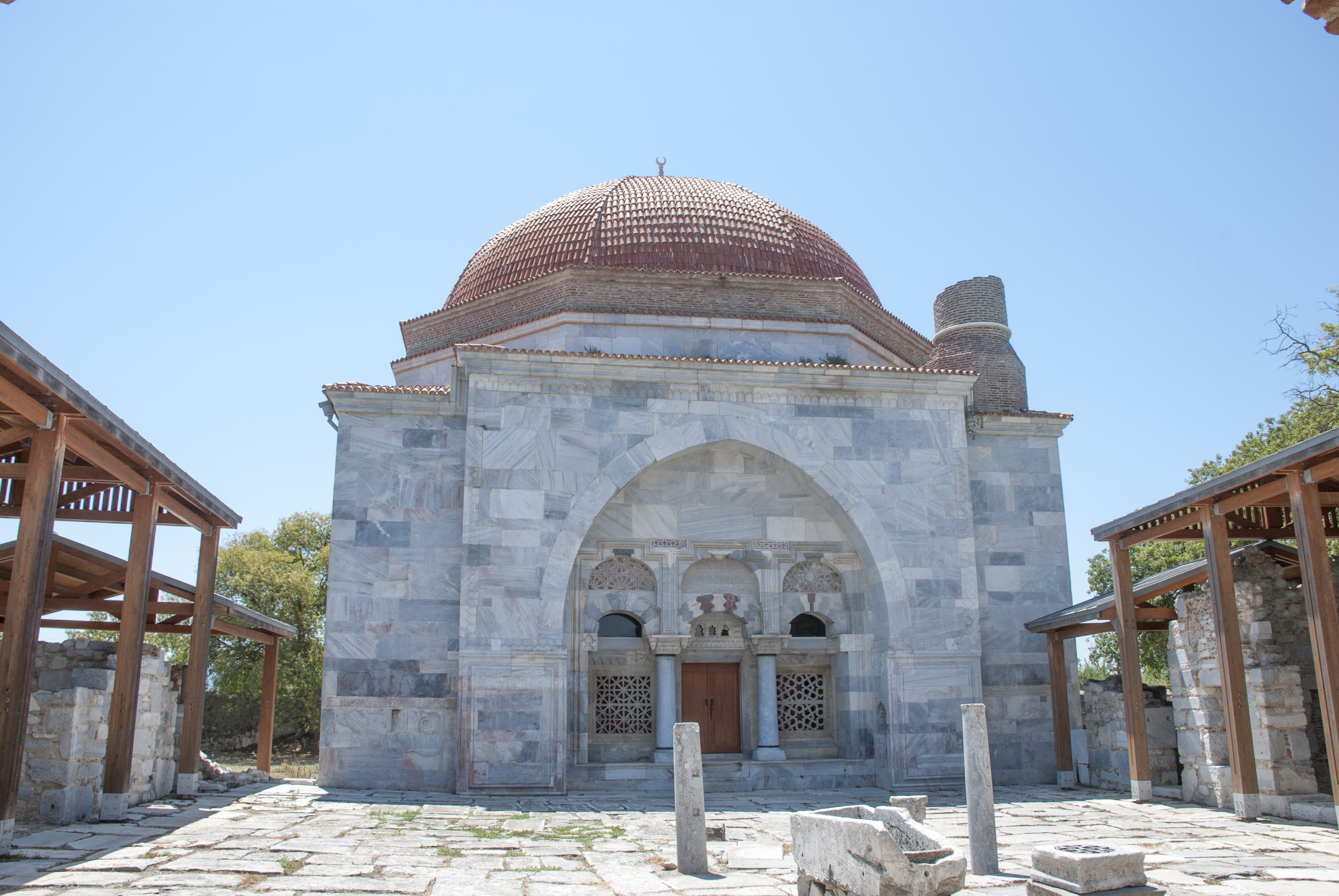

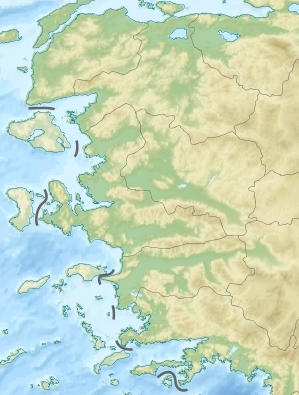
- Location within Western Turkey

Religion
- Affiliation: Islam

Location
- Location: Milet, Didim, Aydın Province, Turkey
- Interactive map of İlyas Bey Mosque
- Coordinates: 37.52642°N 27.27786°E

Architecture
- Type: Mosque
- Style: Seljuk
- Completed: 1403

Specifications
- Dome dia. (inner): 14 m (46 ft)
- Materials: stone, marble brick

Website
- www.miletilyasbey.com

İlyas Bey Mosque is a historical Islamic religious building at Milet in Didim district of Aydın Province, western Turkey. It was built in 1403 by Ilyas Bey (1402–1421), ruler of the Turkish Menteshe emirate.

== Architecture ==
The mosque is part of a complex consisting of a madrasah, a religious educational institute, and a hammam, a bath building. The prayer hall is covered by a dome 14 m (46 ft) in diameter, which is made of brick and covered with tiles, sits on an octagonal base that rests on the four walls. The brick minaret collapsed in the 1955 earthquake. The complex is situated within the Miletus archaeological site. Next to the complex, ruins of a villa with a bath was discovered that dates back to Byzantine times.

Ilyas Bey Complex was awarded in 2012 for its conservation with the European Union Prize for Cultural Heritage / Europa Nostra Award.

Ilyas Bey Mosque uses many features of Seljuk architecture. This style of architecture influenced the Turkish architectes to use it, which helped bring Persian-inspired art and architecture into Turkey and the Ottoman Empire, changing Turkey forever.

Ilyas Bey Mosque is known as one of the most important cultural sites in the city of Söke, Turkey. The square block of the site is based on the original architectural plan which they had planned for the design of the mosque. The minaret is based on Baroque style of architecture. Persian culture influenced the design and building of the Ilyas Bey Mosque including its Seljuk inspired minaret.

What makes this mosque unique from most mosques is that this one used many architectural styles including Greek, Roman, Byzantine, Seljuk, and Ottoman. Another interesting aspect of the mosque includes the dome, which was covered with copper when it was built, rather than with gold like many other mosques. Also, its walls were covered with reused marble blocks, to make it more elegant and durable.

== Gallery ==
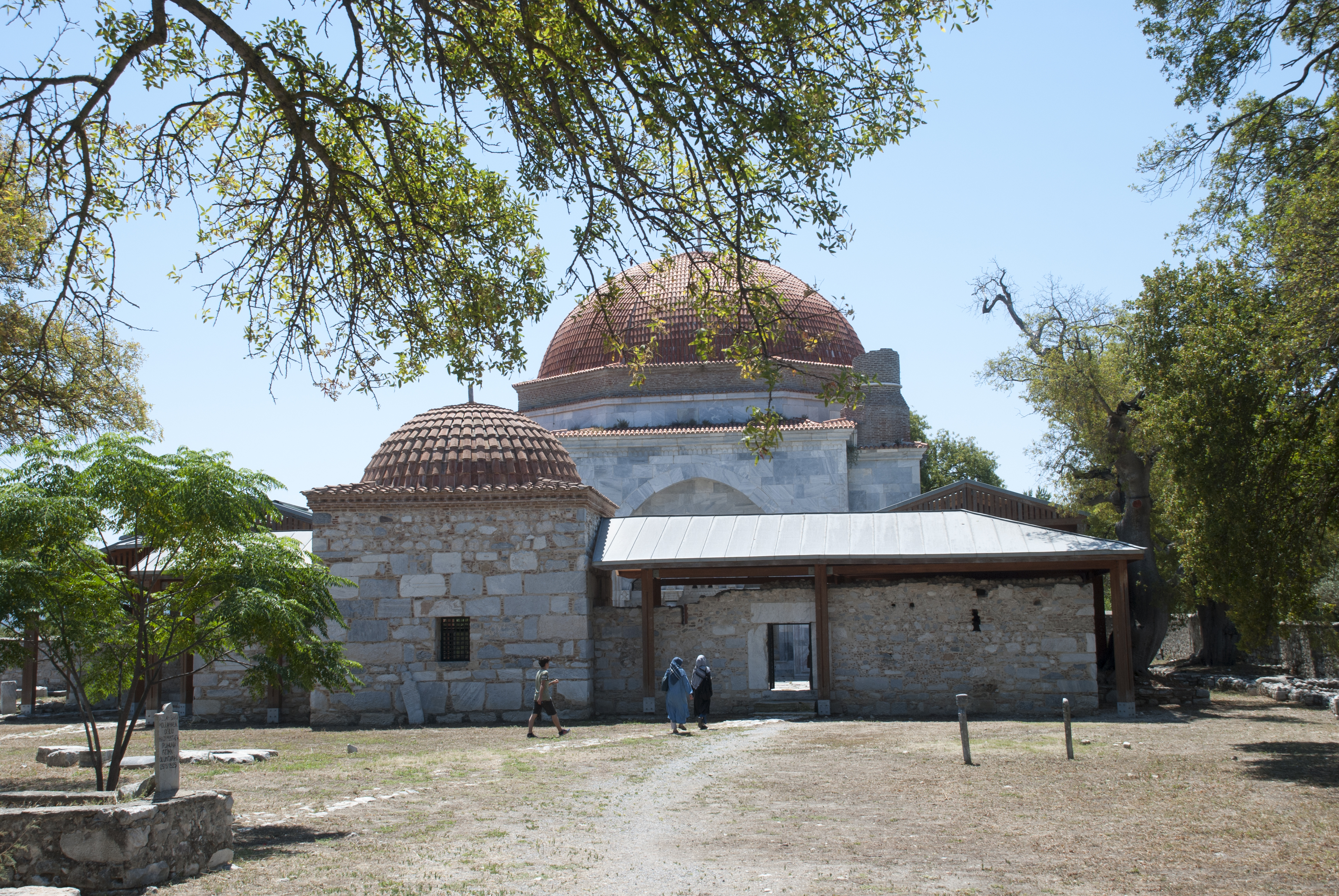
The exterior of the Ottoman mosque complex

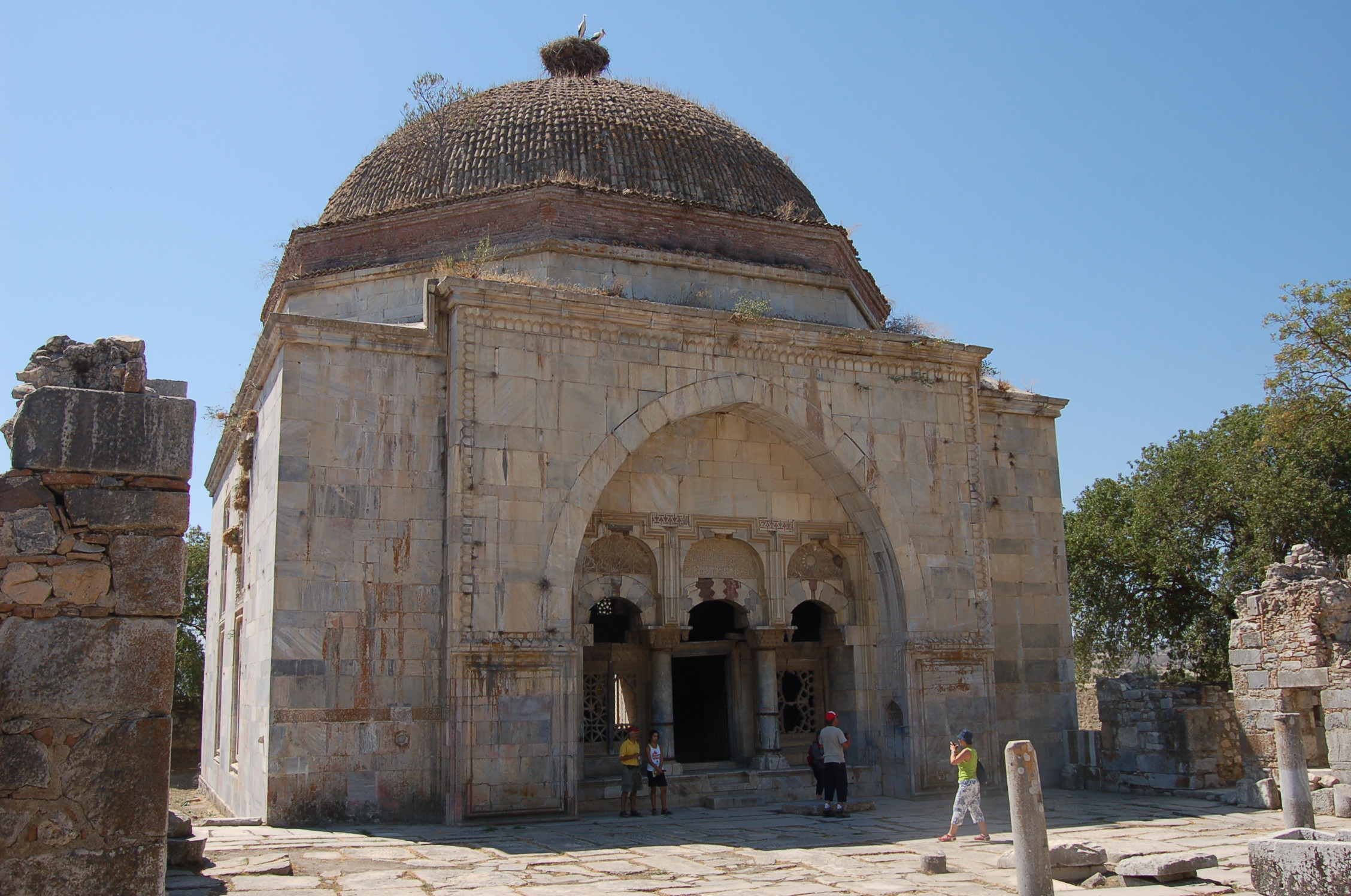
The mosque prior to its renovation

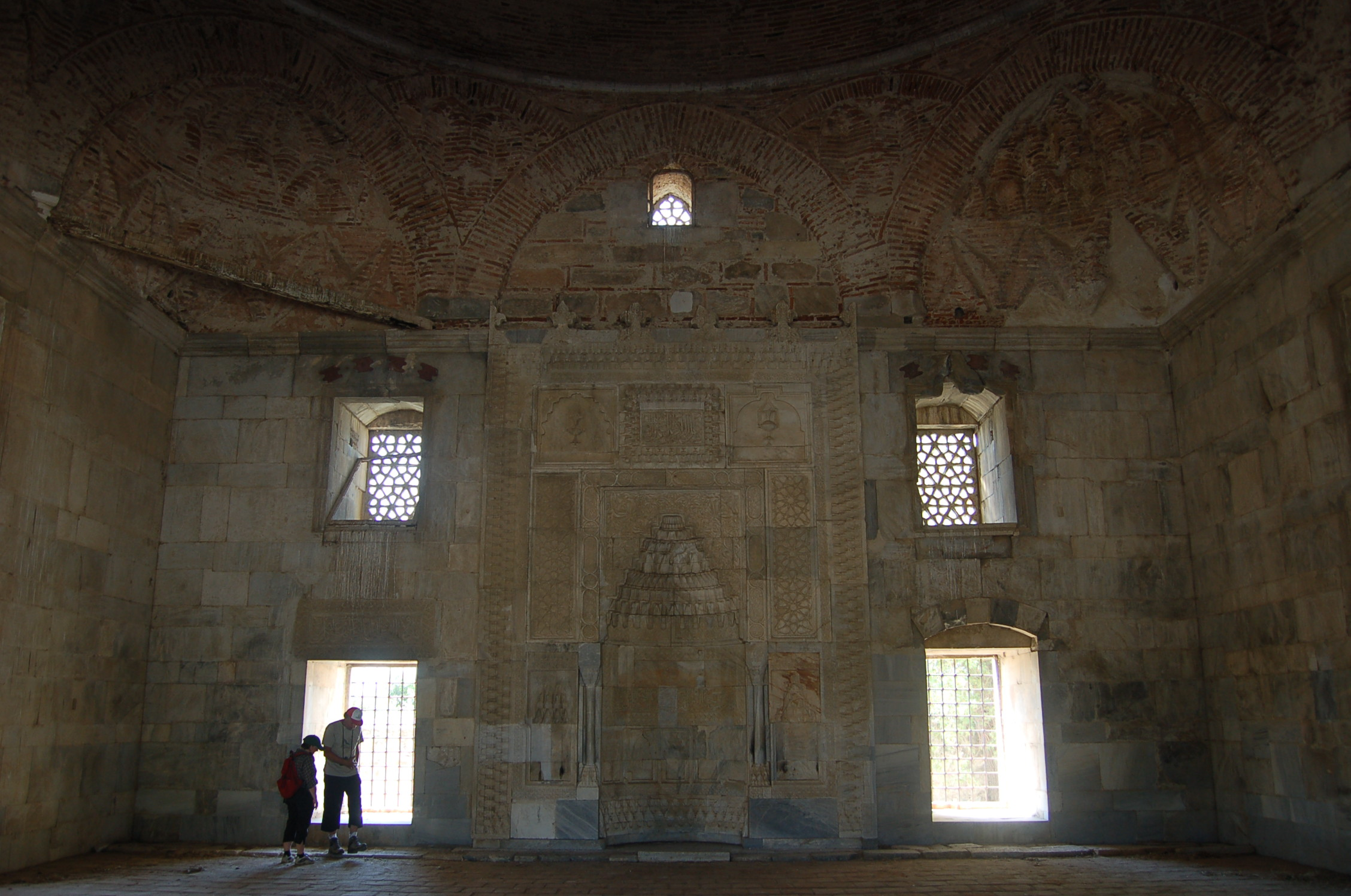
Interior of the Mosque

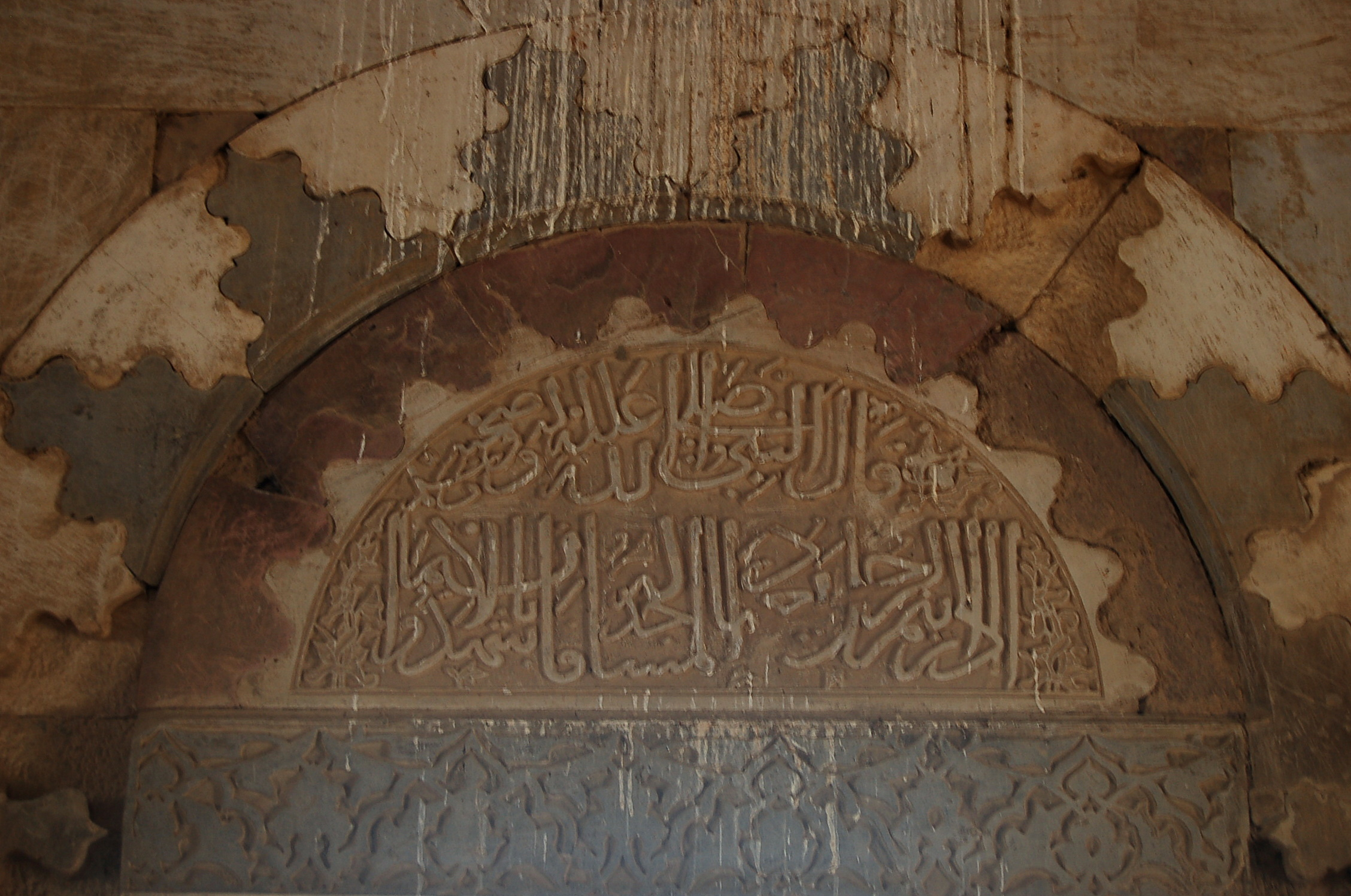
Inscription

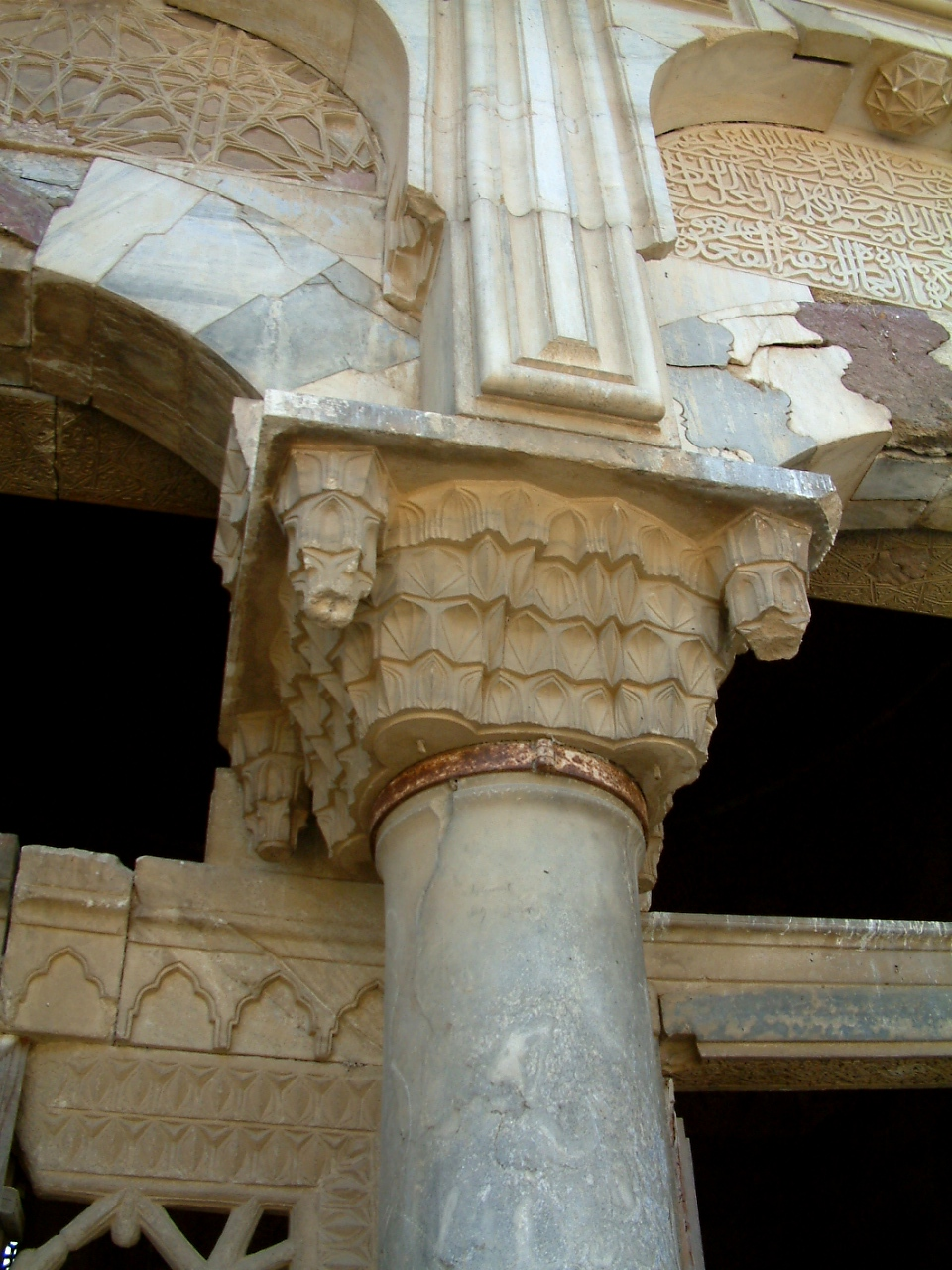
Column

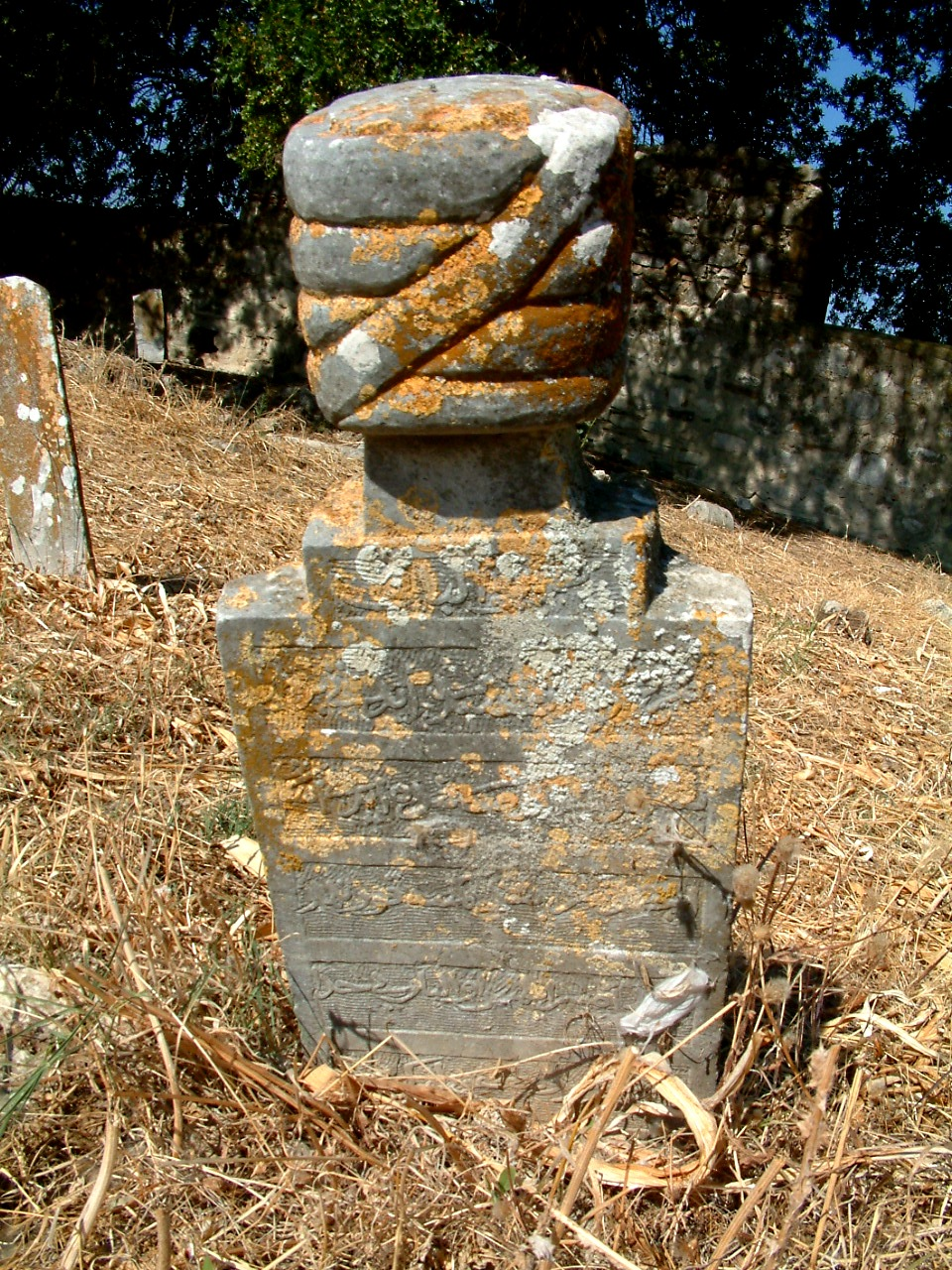
Gravestone

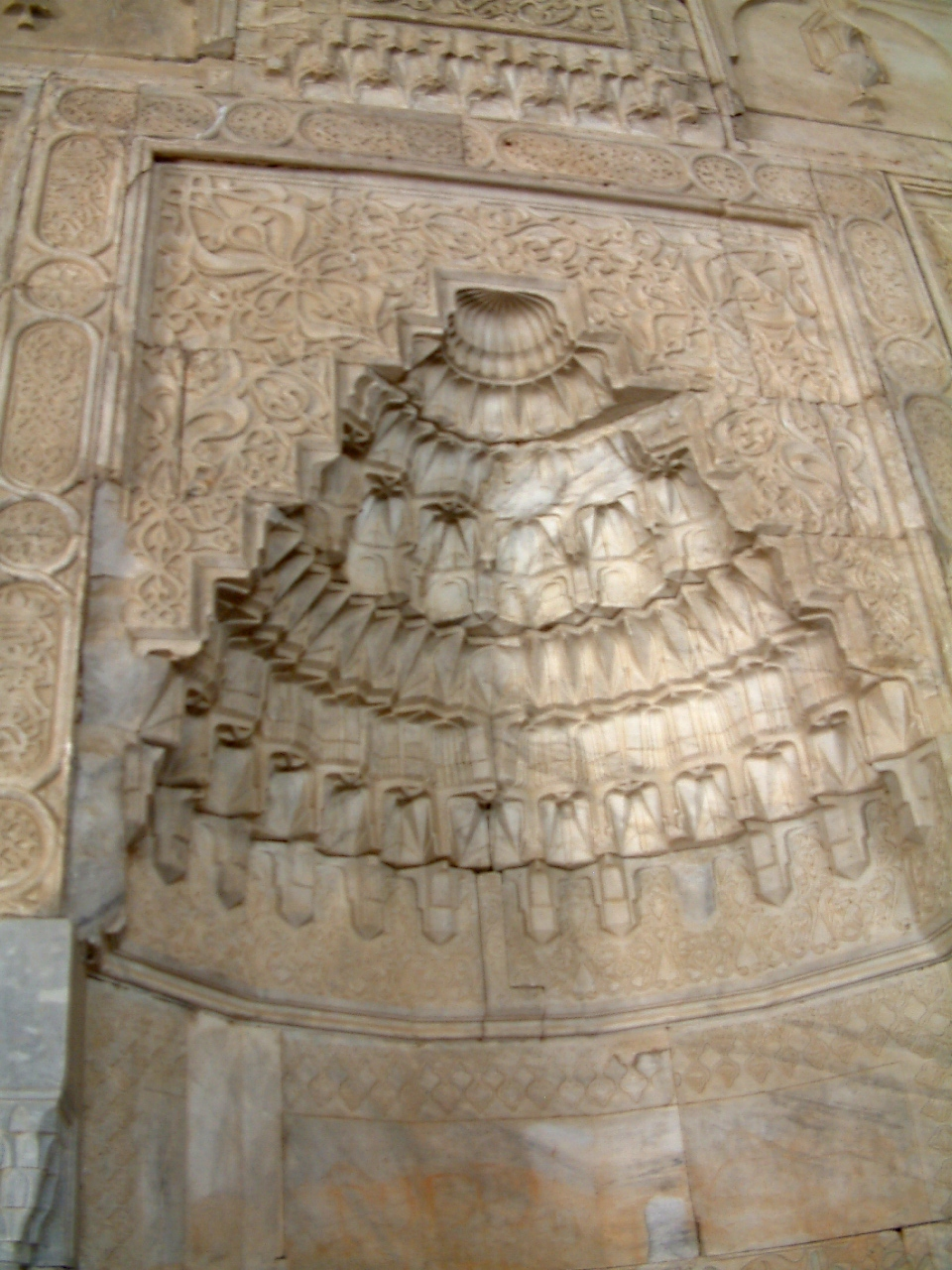
Mihrab with Muqarnas

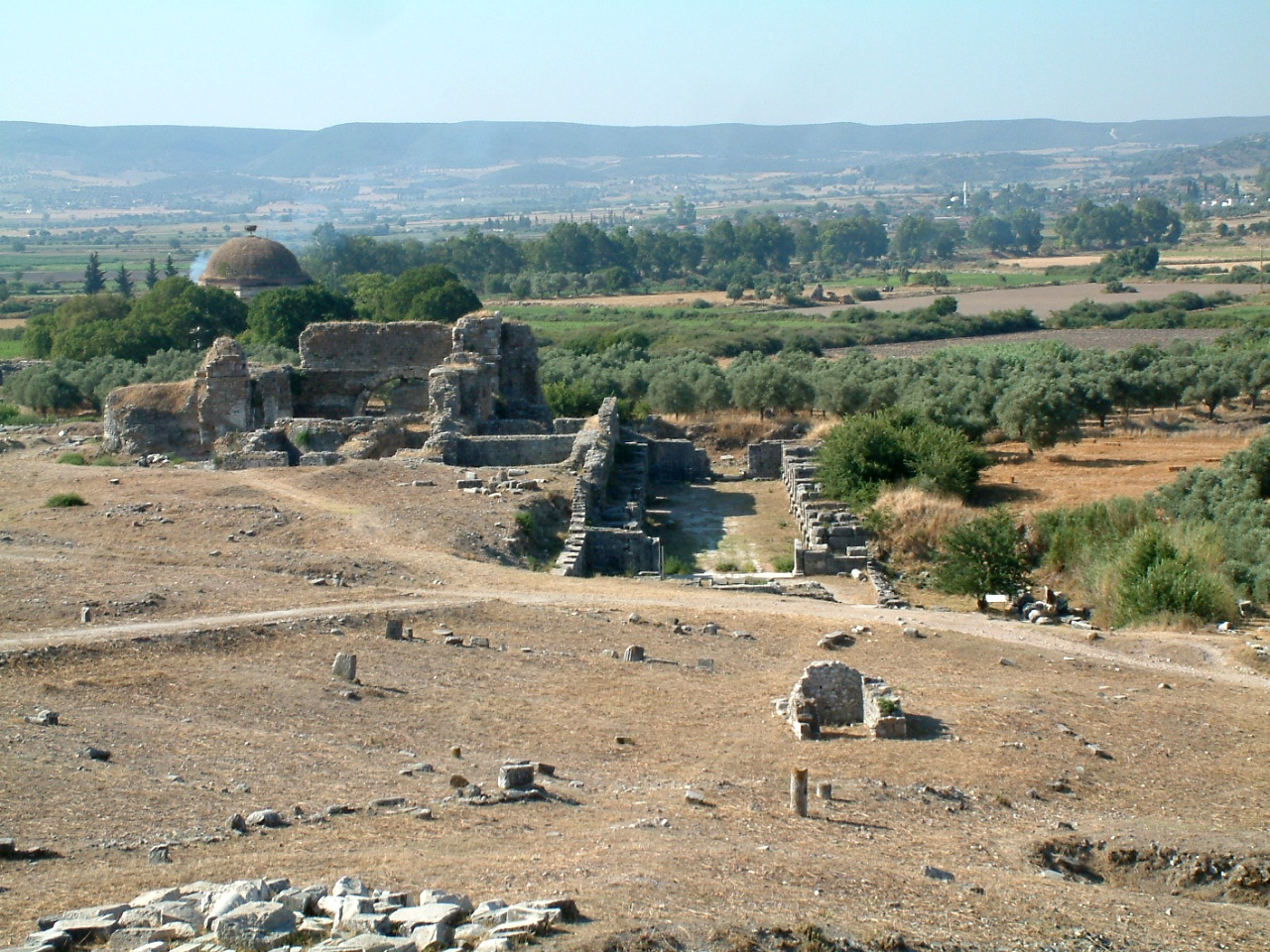
View of the complex from a distance

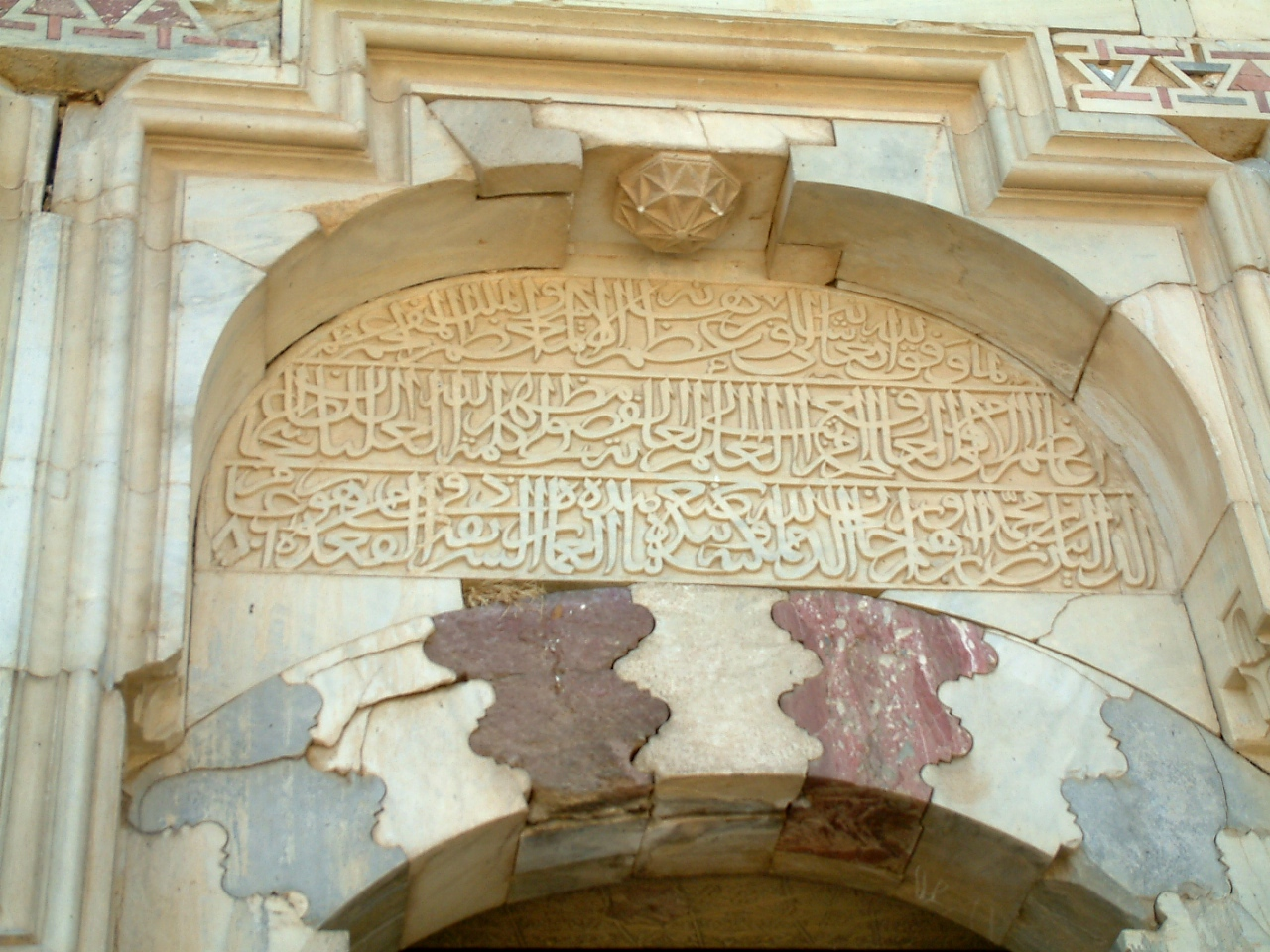
Inscription

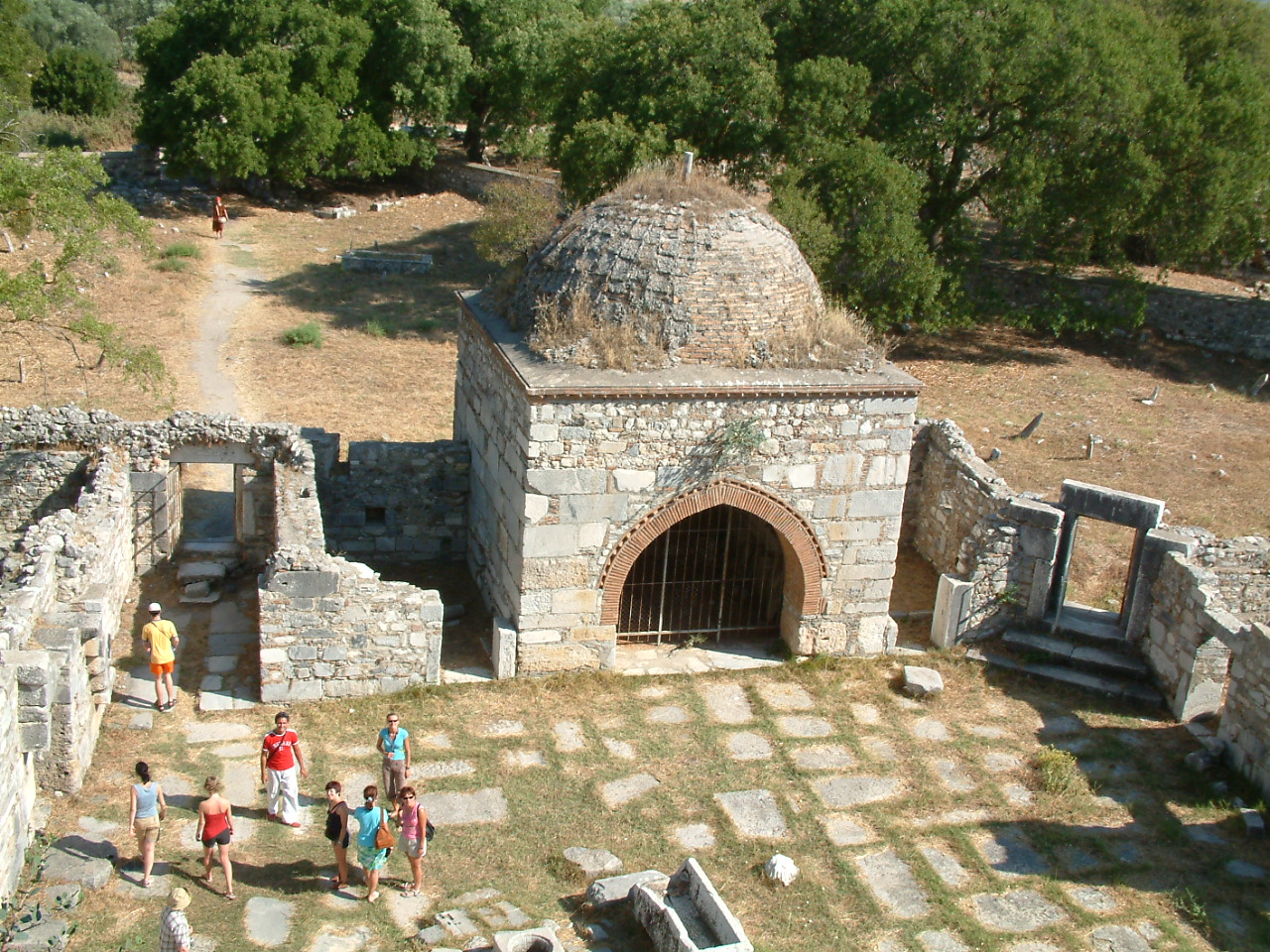
Elevated view of the gatehouse from the main mosque's rooftop
