= Emirate of Limnia =

Turkoman beylik in Anatolia (14-15th centuries)

Beylik of Taceddin (Taceddinoğulları, Taceddinids) was a small Turkmen principality in Anatolia in the 14th and 15th centuries.

== Tacettin ==
After Seljuks of Anatolia were defeated by the Mongols in 1243, many small beylik (principalities) emerged in Anatolia. Taceddin of Canik founded his small beylik in and around Niksar, mid-north Anatolia in 1348. His small beylik was one of the small beyliks which were collectively known as Beyliks of Canik. In 1378 he married Eudokia of Trebizond, the daughter of the Alexios III of Trebizond, the emperor of Trebizond. In 1386 he fell in the battle during his campaign to Hacıemir controlled Ordu (ancient Cotyora).

== Mahmut ==
The next bey was Mahmud. During the early years of Mahmud's reign, the beylik was between two great powers: namely the Ottoman Empire to the southwest and Kadı Buhaneddin to the south. Although Mahmut accepted Burhaneddin's suzerainty he secretly encouraged Bayezid I of the Ottomans against Burhanettin. But the blow came from his brother Alparslan. Alparsalan revolted and captured most of his territory. Nevertheless, after Alparslan's and Burhanettin's death in 1398, he accepted the suzerainty of the Ottoman.

== After Timur ==
In 1402 Turkic warlord Timur invaded Anatolia and defeated Bayezit in the battle of Ankara. During the chaos following the battle (Ottoman Interregnum), Mahmud Bey continued as an ally of the Ottomans. However, during the revolt of Küçük Mustafa (the brother of Murad II), he supported Küçük Mustafa and killed Mihaloğlu Mehmet a descendant of Köse Mihal and a partisan of Murat II in 1423. But after the battle, he was killed by his soldiers. He had two sons; Hüsamettin Hasan and Hüsamettin Mehmet Yavuz. Although the brothers tried to continue in Samsun and Çarşamba, their beylik soon ceased to exist in about 1428.

== Bibliography ==
- Kofoğlu, Sait (2010). "Tâceddinoğulları". TDV Encyclopedia of Islam, Vol. 39 (Şeri̇f Paşa – Tanzanya) (in Turkish). Istanbul: Presidency of Religious Affairs, Centre for Islamic Studies. pp. 343–345. ISBN 978-975-389-632-0.
