= Mutahharten =

Emir of Erzincan from 1379 to 1403

- Emir
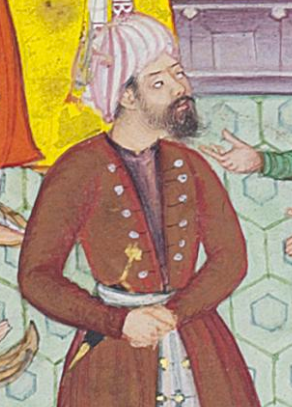
- Mutahharten at the court of Timur, in a Mughal-style miniature by Tulsi with his face painted by Mahdu, from Akbar's copy of Zafarnama (c. 1595–1600).

Emir of Erzincan
- Reign: 1379 – late 1403
- Predecessor: Pir Husayn
- Successor: Yar Ali
- Died: Late 1403
- Consort: Daughter of Emperor Alexios III of Trebizond; Daughter of Ahmad Beg Aq Qoyunlu
- Father: Burak Beg
- Religion: Islam

Mutahharten (Persian: مطهرتن), also known as Taharten (طهرتن; died late 1403), was Emir of Erzincan from 1379 until his death. Erzincan was previously ruled by emirs who exercised autonomy as vassals of the Eretnids. Mutahharten claimed sovereignty from the Eretnids when he assumed power, which prompted the Eretnid Sultan Ala al-Din Ali (r. 1366–1380) to go on an expedition to reinstate his authority over Erzincan. While Mutahharten ultimately repelled Ali, the latter was replaced by his vizier Kadi Burhan al-Din (r. 1381–1398), who was determined to restore the sultanate's former boundaries. Burhan al-Din and Mutahharten were involved in a long-lasting conflict. Upon the advent of Timur, Mutahharten contently swore allegiance and halted his campaigns in Anatolia, but Timur's departure reignited the conflict between Mutahharten and Burhan al-Din. Often overpowered by his enemies, Mutahharten forged alliances with various groups but did not hesitate to turn against his former allies, such as the Aq Qoyunlu, when he saw fit. On the other hand, Mutahharten's relations with the Empire of Trebizond and his Christian subjects were consistently mutualistic, as he favored them for their economic contribution to his realm through trade.

After Kadi Burhan al-Din's death, Mutahharten faced a new threat from the Ottoman state, when Bayezid I demanded he surrender Erzincan. Mutahharten instead relied on Timur's strength and found himself in the midst of the Ottoman–Timurid conflict. Bayezid took Erzincan in 1401, imprisoning Mutahharten for a short period. Mutahharten continued supporting Timur until he died in late 1403. His death signaled the nearing end for the Emirate of Erzincan, which would frequently change hands between the Aq Qoyunlu and their rival Qara Qoyunlu.

== Background of the Emirate of Erzincan and Mutahharten ==
Erzincan and the region around was located south of the Empire of Trebizond, a Christian state in coastal northeastern Anatolia (modern-day Turkey). Although not part of it, Erzincan had significant commercial links to Trebizond, being mostly inhabited by Christian Armenians but administered by a Muslim ruler. Ahi Ayna (r. 1348–1362) was a local ahī (guild member) who purchased control of Erzincan from his predecessor sometime before 1348. He first appears in 1348 as a vassal of Eretna, a former Ilkhanid officer who after the dissolution of the Ilkhanate, established a sovereign sultanate (r. 1343–1352). Following Eretna's death in 1352, Ahi Ayna exercised autonomy and attempted to increase his sphere of influence. In June 1362, Ghiyath al-Din Ahi Ayna Beg went on an expedition in Georgia. He captured Akhaltsikhe, Samstskhe, Atsquri, and had Manglisi pay jizya (special tax on non-Muslims). On 6 August 1361, he continued his expedition in the region of Lazica, i.e., the eastern territories of the Empire of Trebizond. Ahi Ayna was the suzerain of three other emirates, namely those in Erzurum, Bayburt, and Karahisar. His core territory stretched from the Erzincan Plain southwards to the Upper Euphrates Valley near Çaltı. He died on 2–3 July 1362 reportedly as a shaheed (martyr).

Pir Husayn (r. 1362–1379), who was originally the ruler of Karahisar, arrived in Erzincan on 8 June 1362 and succeeded Ahi Ayna Beg. In Ta'rīkh-i taqwīm authored by the 14th-century historian Abu Bakr Qutbi, Pir Husayn is mentioned as an emīr-zāda (lit. 'son of an emir') following the statement about Ahi Ayna's demise, hinting at the possibility he was Ahi Ayna's son. Pir Husayn's ascendance to the throne was not straightforward, as Erzincan was in the midst of a civil war. He "gained independence" on 10 July, having clashed with emirs opposing his rule, who eventually fled to Bayburt and Tercan. On 11 September, he gained direct control of Bayburt after a 32-day siege. Although there is a coin specimen minted in Erzincan for the Eretnid sultan Ala al-Din Ali (r. 1366–1380) dating back to 1366 signifying Erzincan's continued allegiance, Pir Husayn most likely exercised further autonomy, especially following the temporary political vacuum caused by the demise of Ali's predecessor, Ghiyath al-Din Muhammad I (r. 1352–1354, 1355–1365), in 1365. However, there aren't any sufficient accounts for the rest of his rule until 1379, when he died.

While early Ottoman sources mention that Mutahharten was of Tatar origin, in Bazm u Razm, Astarabadi referred to him as the nephew of Eretna, who was of Uyghur descent. Historian Göde identifies Mutahharten's father and Eretna's brother as Burak Beg. According to him, Burak Beg married the daughter of Zahir al-Din Taharten, the Emir of Erzincan at the time, with the approval of Eretna, who later appointed Burak as the Emir of Erzincan at an unclear date.

== Rise to power and war with the Eretnids ==
Mutahharten took power upon Pir Husayn's death in 1379. He issued his own coins and had the khutbah (sermon) read in his name as a declaration of his sovereignty. In the summer of 1379, magnates in the Eretnid Sultanate pressured Ala al-Din Ali to declare war on Mutahharten emphasizing the historical ties of Erzincan with the Eretnid dynasty. Although the Eretnid vizier Kadi Burhan al-Din opposed an immediate campaign, Ali began marching towards Erzincan. Mutahharten sent an embassy to Sivas, where the Eretnid military headquarters were located, to signal he would be willing to bestow control of Erzincan, fearing the economic impact of the war. When the diplomatic mission was inconclusive, a bloody battle took place. Mutahharten faced defeat and retreated, but still resisted coming under Eretnid rule. He sought the help of external powers, such as the Dulkadirids and Aq Qoyunlu, who sent a large army to Erzincan. The Aq Qoyunlu forces defeated and captured Junayd, an Eretnid emir entrusted with intercepting the reinforcements to Mutahharten, fueling the morale of Mutahharten's forces. The Eretnids faced a major loss, and Ali retreated to Sivas. On the orders of Mutahharten, his vassal, Emir Ordu Shah of Erzurum, arrested the grandmother of Ali, Isfahan Shah Khatun, who was on the way to Sivas from Baghdad. Although she was eventually released, this deepened the animosity between Mutahharten and the Eretnids.

== First war with Kadi Burhan al-Din ==
Kadi Burhan al-Din's (r. 1381–98) rise to power as the regent of Ali's successor Muhammad II Chelebi (r. 1380–1381), and his aim at re-imposing authority over the region, prompted Mutahharten to form alliances with Burhan al-Din's rivals and other claimants to the Eretnid throne, such as Shadgeldi, Emir of Amasya (r. 1359–60/1, 1361/2–81). He built amicable relations with several vassals of Burhan al-Din, such as Malik Ahmad of Karahisar and Zannun of Koyulhisar. Relations with Zannun were strengthened via a marriage alliance with Mutahharten's sister. While Shadgeldi was besieging Tokat, Mutahharten and Zannun pushed into Burhan al-Din's domains. However, Zannun and his 2,000-strong force were eventually defeated by Burhan al-Din. Mutahharten sent an embassy to Burhan al-Din and demanded that he return the throne to Ali's son, Muhammad II Chelebi, who was too young to rule. This was an implicit declaration of Mutahharten's claim on the Eretnid throne. Burhan al-Din later imprisoned Mutahharten's embassy, which caused Mutahharten to change his stance, sending apologies and offering an alliance instead. Although Kadi Burhan al-Din released his embassy, he sent Shadgeldi's head to Erzincan in 1381 as a warning after having defeated him on the battlefield. The same year, Kadi Burhan al-Din formally declared his sultanate.

Allied with several Mongol and Turkmen chieftains, Mutahharten went on another campaign on Sivas. Suspicious of his brother-in-law and former ally, Zannun, Mutahharten executed him and massacred the population of Koyulhisar. With the assistance of the Mongol tribe of Barambay, he started raiding Sivas in the summer–spring of 1382. Burhan al-Din dealt with his rivals in the northern region around Amasya, Tokat, and Osmancık until spring 1383. When his authority in the region became apparent and an internal conflict among the rebels began, he focused on his struggle east against Mutahharten. The latter received Aq Qoyunlu aid, headed by Ahmad Aq Qoyunlu (r. 1389–1403), leading an initially successful joint offensive. Conversely, Burhan al-Din reached Erzincan and razed parts of the city to the ground but was unable to capture the city with winter creeping in (1384–5). Burhan al-Din's return to Sivas marked the end of the long war between him and Mutahharten. They agreed to recognize each other's sovereignty and to refrain from getting involved in each other's internal relations. Mutahharten was further obliged to send military aid to Kadi Burhan al-Din in times of war.

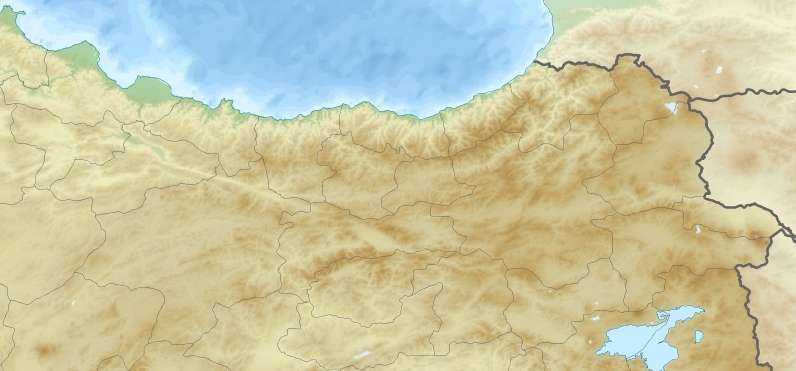
The locations of towns in northeastern Anatolia.

== Advent of Timur ==
In late 1386, Timur (r. 1370–1405), a Turco-Mongol warlord who attempted to invoke the legacy of Genghis Khan, invaded west Iran and was planning his invasion of the Armenian highlands from his military camp in Karabakh. Mutahharten sent his family to Karahisar under the protection of Malik Ahmad, and the people of Erzincan evacuated their homes. When Timur's embassy arrived in Erzincan, Mutahharten swiftly agreed to refrain from joining opposition forces and to abide by Timur's rule, which reduced his fears of a direct Timurid attack. Timur recognized Mutahharten's domains through an exchange of gifts. Although Mutahharten halted his campaigns in Anatolia during this time, Timur's presence was favored by him and other enemies of Burhan al-Din.

When Timur's focus shifted away from the region, Mutahharten used the Qara Qoyunlu Turkomans who took refuge in his territory in an expedition in Burhan al-Din's lands, taking advantage of Burhan al-Din's absence as he was dealing with the local Turkoman principalities to the north. Burhan al-Din returned to Sivas when he learned that Mutahharten was marching there, which caused Mutahharten to stop the campaign in the winter of 1387–8 as he did not want to face Burhan al-Din directly. However, Burhan al-Din initiated preparations to subdue Mutahharten. In 1387, Mutahharten reported Burhan al-Din to the Mamluk Sultan Barquq (r. 1382–1389, 1390–1399) as an ally of Timur, which initiated a joint campaign with the Mamluks on Sivas that lasted until the Mamluks retreated from the region in 1389.

Mutahharten broke the alliance with the Aq Qoyunlu upon the death of Qutlugh (r. 1362–1389) and the succession of his son Ahmed (r. 1389–1403). Mutahharten was ultimately overpowered on the battlefield. This prompted him to seek the assistance of Qara Mahammad (r. 1380–89) of the Qara Qoyunlu. They flanked the Aq Qoyunlu forces, who took refuge under Burhan al-Din. Shortly after, Mutahharten and Qara Yusuf (r. 1389–1420), Qara Mahammad's son and successor, planned a major war on the Aq Qoyunlu, but were defeated near Endris. Qara Yusuf was captured, and Mutahharten fled to Erzincan. The latter prepared for a counter-attack in Shamsat (located between Harpoot and Bayburt) and reentered Aq Qoyunlu territory. He stationed his army on the right bank of Murat River near the town of Gulushkerd, confronting the Aq Qoyunlu forces on the opposite side. Although Ahmad Aq Qoyunlu wanted to make peace with Mutahharten, to whom his daughter was married, Mutahharten was defeated a second time at the hands of Ahmad's brother, Qara Yuluk (r. 1378–1435).

Upon the news of another Timurid expedition in 1393–4, Mutahharten reaffirmed his allegiance to Timur. He acted as an ambassador during Timur's siege of Avnik. The author of Bazm-u Razm, Astarabadi, who was hostile to Mutahharten, described his actions during this period as cowardly. Astarabadi claimed that Mutahharten stopped administering his region altogether. After allegedly kissing Timur's stirrup, Mutahharten changed the name on his coins and the khutba to Timur's and tried to provoke him to invade all of Anatolia and Syria. However, Timur left Mutahharten without a liege when he departed for Georgia to subdue Tokhtamysh of the Golden Horde (r. 1379–1380, 1380–1396).

In retribution for Mutahharten's allegiance to Timur, Burhan al-Din took the fortresses of Ezdebir, Sis, and Burtulush. Though, when he departed for Sivas, the guards of these fortresses betrayed him and surrendered control to Mutahharten. With the support of Ahmad Aq Qoyunlu, Burhan al-Din decimated the region of Erzincan for a whole month and granted the Aq Qoyunlu the territory around Bayburt. On 27 October 1395, Mutahharten clashed with Burhan al-Din at Pulur. Although Mutahharten came out victorious there, Burhan al-Din continued to pursue Mutahharten until Burhan al-Din was killed by Qara Yuluk on 14 July 1398.

== Relations with Trebizond and Christians ==
Starting from 1379 at the latest, the Emirate of Erzincan was the sole neighbor of the Empire of Trebizond, except for the Emirate of Hajji Amir and the Chepni nomads near the Philabonites valley to the northwest. To the southwest of Chaldia was Mutahharten's vassal, the Emirate of Karahisar, while Trebizond directly bordered Mutahharten up to Lazica. According to Kitab-i Diyarbakriyya, Mutahharten imposed kharāj (Islamic agricultural tax) on Trebizond. The empire likely was dependent upon Erzincan for matters of security and commerce. The chronicles of the Trapezuntine historian Michael Panaretos of 1380–90s lack any mention of clashes with Turks, other than the campaign of Emperor Alexios III (r. 1349–1390) on the Chepni, most probably because there were no direct border conflicts, and the trade through Trebizond continued. Therefore, Mutahharten's marriage to a daughter of the emperor was virtually a repayment for the protection he provided them.

Around 1400, Muslims from the largely Christian city of Erzincan reported to Timur that Mutahharten cherished the Christian residents more than the Christians favored him. In response to Timur's inquiry about these complaints, Mutahharten openly agreed that he especially favored the Christians for the benefit of trade. Timur commanded that an influential Greek Orthodox priest from Erzincan convert to Islam. When the priest resisted, Timur ordered the total massacre of the Christians of Erzincan. Mutahharten had the order reversed by paying him 9,000 aspers.

== Ottoman–Timurid conflict and death ==
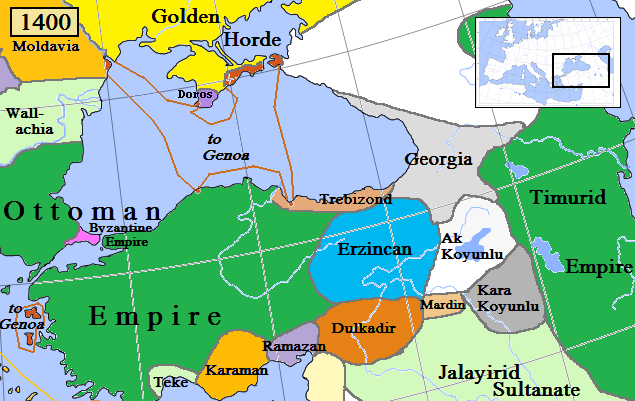
Political map of Anatolia, c. 1400

The Ottoman sultan Bayezid I (r. 1389–1402) annexed Sivas in 1398 and demanded that Mutahharten accept his suzerainty. Instead, Mutahharten relied on Timur, who was unable to diplomatically resolve the dispute over Erzincan but conquered Sivas in August 1400. Bayezid did not shy away from striking back and advanced as far as Erzincan in 1401, where he took Mutahharten and his Trapezuntine wife captive. Mutahharten was ultimately released and restored as the ruler when Qara Yusuf, who had been given control of the place, did not fare well with the locals. Mutahharten momentarily acted as an intermediary between the Ottomans and the Timurids, but soon participated in the latter's Anatolian campaign that would become a major blow to the Ottomans at the Battle of Ankara.

Mutahharten died in late 1403. He had no surviving legitimate male issue. His death signified the final years of the independent Emirate of Erzincan. His grandson Yar Ali ruled between 1403–1410 and 1420–1425, but the emirate then ceased to exist, and continuous conflict between the stronger powers of Aq Qoyunlu and Qara Qoyunlu over control of Erzincan soon prevailed.

== Bibliography ==
- Bryer, Anthony (1975). "Greeks and Türkmens: The Pontic Exception". Dumbarton Oaks Papers. 29: 113–150. doi:10.2307/1291371. ISSN 0070-7546. JSTOR 1291371.
- Göde, Kemal (1994). Eratnalılar, 1327-1381 (in Turkish). Turkish Historical Society Press. ISBN 9751606128. OCLC 31737254.
- Shukurov, Rustam [in Russian] (June 1994). "Between Peace and Hostility: Trebizond and the Pontic Turkish Periphery in the Fourteenth Century". Mediterranean Historical Review. 9 (1). Routledge: 20–72. doi:10.1080/09518969408569663. ISSN 0951-8967.
- Sinclair, T. A. [at Wikidata] (31 December 1989). Eastern Turkey: An Architectural & Archaeological Survey. Vol. II. Pindar Press. ISBN 978-0-907132-33-2. OCLC 16887803.
- Yücel, Yaşar [in Turkish] (October 1971). "Mutahharten ve Erzincan Emirliği" [Mutahharten and the Emirate of Erzincan]. Belleten (in Turkish). 35 (140): 665–719. ISSN 2791-6472.
