= Emirate of Erzincan =

Emirate in Anatolia from at least 1348 to 1410

Coordinates: 39°44′47″N 39°29′29″E

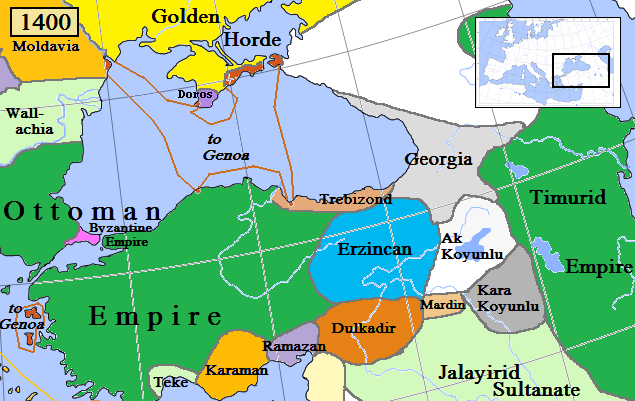
- Erzincan, c. 1400
- Status: Emirate
- Capital: Erzincan
- Religion: Islam (rulers); Christianity (population)
- Government: Monarchy
- Emir
  - 1348–1362: Ahi Ayna
  - 1362–1379: Pir Husayn
  - 1379–1403: Mutahharten
Preceded by	Succeeded by
Kingdom of Georgia; Empire of Trebizond	Qara Qoyunlu

The Emirate of Erzincan (/ˌɛərzɪnˈdʒɑːn/ AIR-zinn-JAHN) was a state in eastern Anatolia and the Caucasus, centered around the city of Erzincan (present-day Turkey) in the 14th and early 15th centuries. Its first known ruler, Ahi Ayna (r. 1348–1362), rose to power as a vassal of the Eretnids through a purchase from his unknown predecessor sometime before 1348. Ahi Ayna exercised autonomy after his overlord Eretna's (r. 1343–1352) death. Ahi Ayna is known to have clashed with the neighboring Empire of Trebizond and other emirates. In 1361, he advanced into the Kingdom of Georgia, capturing several fortresses. His probable son and the ruler of Karahisar, Pir Husayn (r. 1362–1379) arrived in Erzincan in June the next year amidst a possible unrest. Ahi Ayna was killed in July and succeeded by Pir Husayn. While the latter is known to have been involved in subsequent conflicts with the neighboring local rulers in the next months, details on his reign until his death remain unknown.

The nephew of Eretna, Mutahharten (r. 1379–1403) took power following Pir Husayn's passing and declared independence, which triggered a long-lasting war with the Eretnids and their vizier Kadi Burhan al-Din, who usurped the rule of the Eretnids in 1381. Upon the advent of Timur, Mutahharten swore allegiance and temporarily halted his campaigns in Anatolia. Often overpowered by his enemies, Mutahharten forged alliances with various groups but did not hesitate to turn against his former allies, such as the Aq Qoyunlu, when he saw fit. Contrary to his predecessors, Mutahharten observed friendly relations with the Empire of Trebizond and his Christian subjects. After Kadi Burhan al-Din's death, Mutahharten faced a new threat from the Ottoman state, when Bayezid I demanded he surrender Erzincan. Mutahharten instead relied on Timur's strength and found himself in the midst of the Ottoman–Timurid conflict. Bayezid took Erzincan in 1401, imprisoning Mutahharten for a short period. Mutahharten continued supporting Timur until he died in late 1403. His death signaled the nearing end for the Emirate of Erzincan, which would frequently change hands between the Aq Qoyunlu and their rival Qara Qoyunlu.

== History ==
=== Ahi Ayna and Pir Husayn (1348–1379) ===
A local ahī, Ahi Ayna purchased control of Erzincan from his predecessor sometime before 1348. Ahi Ayna first appears in records as a vassal of Eretna circa 1348. Michael Panaretos wrote that in June 1348, Ahi Ayna led a joint attack against the Empire of Trebizond together with Tur Ali Beg of Aq Qoyunlu Turkmens and Muhammad Rikabdar, Emir of Bayburt. He returned to Erzincan after 3 days of campaign was inconclusive.

Following Eretna's death, Ahi Ayna exercised autonomy and attempted to increase his sphere of influence. An Armenian colophon of 1355 mentions that Ahi Ayna was attacked by "Khochay Yali", likely Khoja Latif of Bayburt. In June 1361, Ahi Ayna went on an expedition in the Kingdom of Georgia. He captured Akhaltsikhe, Samstskhe, and Atsquri, took 12,000 people captive, and had Manglisi pay jizya (special tax on non-Muslims). On 6 August 1361, Ahi Ayna continued his expedition in the region of Lazica, i.e., the eastern territories of the Empire of Trebizond. In October of that year, he besieged but could bnot capture the fortresses of Golacha and Koukos.

Ahi Ayna was the suzerain of three other emirates, namely those in Erzurum, Bayburt, and Karahisar. His core territory stretched from the Erzincan Plain southwards to Upper Euphrates Valley near Çaltı. Kemah was under the administration of a governor instead of a vassal emir like Ahi Ayna. Although Ahi Ayna acted semi-independently during the reign of Ghiyath al-Din Muhammad I of the Eretnid Sultanate, an Eretnid coin minted in Erzincan from the year 1359 indicates that Ahi Ayna's subordinate position continued and he never declared independence. Ahi Ayna died on 2–3 July 1362 reportedly as a shahīd (martyr), suggesting a violent death.

Pir Husayn, who was originally the ruler of Karahisar, arrived in Erzincan on 8 June 1362 and succeeded Ahi Ayna Beg. In Abu Bakr Qutbi's Ta'rīkh-i taqwīm, he is mentioned as an emīr-zāda (lit. 'son of an emir') following the statement about Ahi Ayna's demise, hinting at the possibility he was Ahi Ayna's son. Pir Husayn's ascendance to the throne was not straightforward as Erzincan was in the midst of a civil war. He "gained independence" on 10 July, having clashed with emirs opposing his rule, who eventually fled to Bayburt and Tercan. On 11 September, he gained control of Bayburt after a 32-day siege. Although there is a coin specimen minted in Erzincan for Ala al-Din Ali dating back to 1366, Pir Husayn most likely exercised further autonomy, especially following the temporary political vacuum caused by Ghiyath al-Din Muhammad I's death in 1365. However, there aren't any available accounts of the period until Pir Husayn's death in 1379.

=== Mutahharten (1379–1403) ===
Mutahharten took power upon Pir Husayn's death in 1379. He struck his own coins and had the khutbah (sermon) read in his name as a declaration of his sovereignty. Although the Eretnid vizier Kadi Burhan al-Din opposed an immediate campaign, the Eretnid sultan Ali began marching towards Erzincan in the summer of the same year. Mutahharten initially faced defeat in a bloody battle and retreated but still resisted coming under Eretnids, who subsequently faced a major loss. Kadi Burhan al-Din's (r. 1381–1398) rise to power as the regent of Ali's successor Muhammad II Chelebi (r. 1380–81), and his aim at re-imposing authority over the region, prompted Mutahharten to form alliances with Burhan al-Din's rivals and other claimants to the Eretnid throne, such as Shadgeldi, Emir of Amasya (r. 1359–1360/1, 1361/2–1381). However, their 2,000-strong force was soon overpowered by Burhan al-Din, who sent latter's head to Erzincan in 1381 as a warning to Mutahharten. The same year, Kadi Burhan al-Din formally declared his sultanate.

Allied with several Mongol and Turkmen chieftains, Mutahharten went on another campaign on Sivas. However, Burhan al-Din reached Erzincan and razed parts of the city to the ground but was unable to capture the city with winter beginning in 1384–1385. Burhan al-Din's return to Sivas marked the end of the long war between him and Mutahharten. They agreed to recognize each other's sovereignty and to refrain from getting involved in each other's internal relations. Mutahharten was further obliged to send military aid to Kadi Burhan al-Din in times of war.

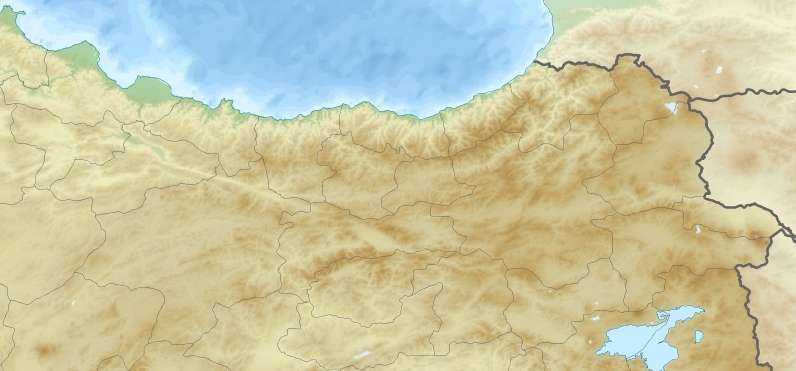
The locations of towns in northeastern Anatolia.

In late 1386, Timur (r. 1370–1405), a Turco-Mongol warlord who attempted to invoke the legacy of Genghis Khan, invaded west Iran and was planning his invasion of the Armenian highlands from his military camp in Karabakh. When Timur's embassy arrived in Erzincan, Mutahharten swiftly agreed to refrain from joining opposition forces and to abide by Timur's rule, which reduced his fears of a direct Timurid attack. Timur recognized Mutahharten's domains through an exchange of gifts. Although Mutahharten halted his campaigns in Anatolia during this time, Timur's presence was favored by him and other enemies of Burhan al-Din.

When Timur's focus shifted away from the region, Mutahharten used the Qara Qoyunlu Turkomans who took refuge in his territory in an expedition in Burhan al-Din's lands, taking advantage of Burhan al-Din's absence. Burhan al-Din returned to Sivas when he learned that Mutahharten was marching there, prompting Mutahharten to stop the campaign in the winter of 1387–1388. In 1387, Mutahharten reported Burhan al-Din to the Mamluk Sultan Barquq (r. 1382–1389, 1390–1399) as an ally of Timur, which initiated a joint campaign with the Mamluks on Sivas that lasted until the Mamluks retreated from the region in 1389.

Upon the news of another Timurid expedition in 1393–1394, Mutahharten reaffirmed his allegiance to Timur. He acted as an ambassador during Timur's siege of Avnik. The author of Bazm u Razm, Astarabadi, who was hostile to Mutahharten, described his actions during this period as cowardly. Astarabadi claimed that Mutahharten stopped administering his region altogether. After allegedly kissing Timur's stirrup, Mutahharten changed the name on his coins and the khutba to Timur's and tried to provoke him to invade all of Anatolia and Syria. However, Timur left Mutahharten without a liege when he departed for Georgia to subdue Tokhtamysh of the Golden Horde (r. 1379–80, 1380–96). With the support of Ahmad Aq Qoyunlu, Burhan al-Din decimated the region of Erzincan for a whole month and granted the Aq Qoyunlu the territory around Bayburt. On 27 October 1395, Mutahharten clashed with Burhan al-Din at Pulur. Although Mutahharten emerged victorious there, Burhan al-Din continued pursuing Mutahharten until Qara Yuluk killed Burhan al-Din on 14 July 1398.

The Ottoman sultan Bayezid I (r. 1389–1402) annexed Sivas in 1398 and demanded that Mutahharten accept his suzerainty. Instead, Mutahharten relied on Timur, who conquered Sivas in August 1400. Bayezid did not shy away from striking back and advanced as far as Erzincan in 1401, where he took Mutahharten and his Trapezuntine wife captive. Mutahharten was ultimately released and restored as the ruler when Qara Yusuf, who had been given control of the place, did not fare well with the locals. Mutahharten briefly acted as an intermediary between the Ottomans and the Timurids, but soon participated in the latter's Anatolian campaign that would become a major blow to the Ottomans at the Battle of Ankara. Mutahharten died in late 1403. He had no surviving legitimate male issue.

=== Fall ===
Exact details on the emirate's end following Mutahharten's demise are obscure. Castilian traveler Ruy González de Clavijo claimed that Mutahharten's daughter's son, Sheikh Ali, first gained control of the city, and after Timur's intervention, Mutahharten's son usurped the throne, although Mutahharten lacked legitimate heirs. According to Clavijo, the city of Erzincan was besieged by the Qara Qoyunlu ruler Qara Yusuf in 1406. However, no other contemporary sources provide a similar account. Iranian historian Hafiz-i Abru noted that in 1410, Mutahharten's other grandson Sheikh Hasan surrendered after resisting a 45-day siege led by Qara Yusuf. Qara Yusuf appointed one of his adherents, Pir Umar, as the governor of Erzincan. Sheikh Hasan was granted control of a fortress near Erzurum, thus putting an end to the emirate. Historian Rustam Shukurov identifies Mutahharten's grandson "Yar Ali" as the emir or governor between 1403–1410 and 1420–1425.

== Culture and economy ==
Ahi Ayna is known to have built a takya (building for Sufi gatherings) known after himself in the city of Erzincan. Mutahharten's legacy in Erzincan includes a madrasa (school) and zawiya (Sufi building).

During the period of the emirate, Erzincan was a scene of literary exchange and production. Tarikh-i Chingiz Khan (lit. 'the history of Genghis Khan') was authored in Erzincan by Sharaf al-Din Sati, a well-respected local dignitary and history-writer. It is known that this work's production involved trade with Syrian cities, as the paper was sourced from Damascus, costing 6000 dirhams, and the work went through binding process in Hama in before arriving in Erzincan. A copy of Rumi's Masnavi was prepared by Muhammad ibn Husayn al-Mawlawi in January–February 1373 likely in Erzincan for "Taj al-Din Shaykh Husayn Beg", who is identified with Pir Husayn.

According to Francesco Balducci Pegolotti, a mid-14th-century merchant, textiles from Erzincan were exported as far as the Italian Peninsula. The region was also rich in copper mines.

== Population ==
The major cities ruled by the emirate and its subordinates, namely Erzincan and Bayburt, housed a majority Christian populace, mainly Armenians, while the rulers were Muslims. Contemporary Maghrebi traveler Ibn Battuta mentioned in his Rihla that Erzincan's Armenian bishop exercised further than solely local influence. Castilian traveler Clavijo moreover relayed how Mutahharten reversed Timur's order of the conversion of a local influential Greek Orthodox priest to Islam, and the total massacre of the local Christians by paying him 9,000 aspers. On the other hand, the emirate also contained some Muslim-majority communities. Ibn Battuta mentioned that the Muslims in Erzincan were Turkish-speakers.

== Bibliography ==
- Bernardini, Michele (October 2001). Veinstein, Gilles (ed.). "Motahharten entre Timur et Bayezid : une position inconfortable dans les remous de l'histoire anatolienne" [Mutahharten between Timur and Bayezid: an uncomfortable position in the turmoil of Anatolian history]. Syncrétismes et hérésies dans l'Orient seldjoukide et ottoman (XIVe-XVIIIe siècle) (in French). Paris: Peeters: 199–211. ISBN 9789042915497. OCLC 56371634.
- Bryer, Anthony (1975). "Greeks and Türkmens: The Pontic Exception". Dumbarton Oaks Papers. 29: 113–148. doi:10.2307/1291371. JSTOR 1291371.
- Jackson, Cailah (4 September 2020). Islamic Manuscripts of Late Medieval Rum, 1270s-1370s Production, Patronage and the Arts of the Book. Edinburgh University Press. ISBN 9781474451482. OCLC 1201195079.
- Miroğlu, İsmet (1995). "Erzincan". TDV Encyclopedia of Islam, Vol. 11 (Elbi̇stan – Eymi̇r) (in Turkish). Istanbul: Presidency of Religious Affairs, Centre for Islamic Studies. pp. 318–321. ISBN 978-975-389-438-8.
- Shukurov, Rustam (June 1994). "Between Peace and Hostility: Trebizond and the Pontic Turkish Periphery in the Fourteenth Century". Mediterranean Historical Review. 9 (1). Routledge: 20–72. doi:10.1080/09518969408569663.
- Sinclair, T. A. (31 December 1989). Eastern Turkey: An Architectural & Archaeological Survey. Vol. II. Pindar Press. ISBN 978-0-907132-33-2.
- Tanındı, Zeren (2012). "The Arts of the Book : Patrons and Interactions in Erzincan between 1365 and 1410". Varia Anatolica. 15. Translated by Beyazıt, Deniz. Publications de l'Institut Français d'Études Anatoliennes: 221–238. ISBN 9782362450020. ISSN 1013-9559. OCLC 475041002.
- Yücel, Yaşar (October 1971). "Mutahharten ve Erzincan Emirliği" [Mutahharten and the Emirate of Erzincan]. Belleten (in Turkish). 35 (140): 665–719. doi:10.37879/belleten.1971.140-665.
