= 1362 =

1362 in various calendars
- Gregorian calendar: 1362; MCCCLXII
- Ab urbe condita: 2115
- Armenian calendar: 811; ԹՎ ՊԺԱ
- Assyrian calendar: 6112
- Balinese saka calendar: 1283–1284
- Bengali calendar: 768–769
- Berber calendar: 2312
- English Regnal year: 35 Edw. 3 – 36 Edw. 3
- Buddhist calendar: 1906
- Burmese calendar: 724
- Byzantine calendar: 6870–6871
- Chinese calendar: 辛丑年 (Metal Ox); 4059 or 3852 — to — 壬寅年 (Water Tiger); 4060 or 3853
- Coptic calendar: 1078–1079
- Discordian calendar: 2528
- Ethiopian calendar: 1354–1355
- Hebrew calendar: 5122–5123
- Hindu calendars
- Vikram Samvat: 1418–1419
- Shaka Samvat: 1283–1284
- Kali Yuga: 4462–4463
- Holocene calendar: 11362
- Igbo calendar: 362–363
- Iranian calendar: 740–741
- Islamic calendar: 763–764
- Japanese calendar: Kōan 2 / Jōji 1 (貞治元年)
- Javanese calendar: 1275–1276
- Julian calendar: 1362; MCCCLXII
- Korean calendar: 3695
- Minguo calendar: 550 before ROC 民前550年
- Nanakshahi calendar: −106
- Thai solar calendar: 1904–1905
- Tibetan calendar: ལྕགས་མོ་གླང་ལོ་ (female Iron-Ox); 1488 or 1107 or 335 — to — ཆུ་ཕོ་སྟག་ལོ་ (male Water-Tiger); 1489 or 1108 or 336

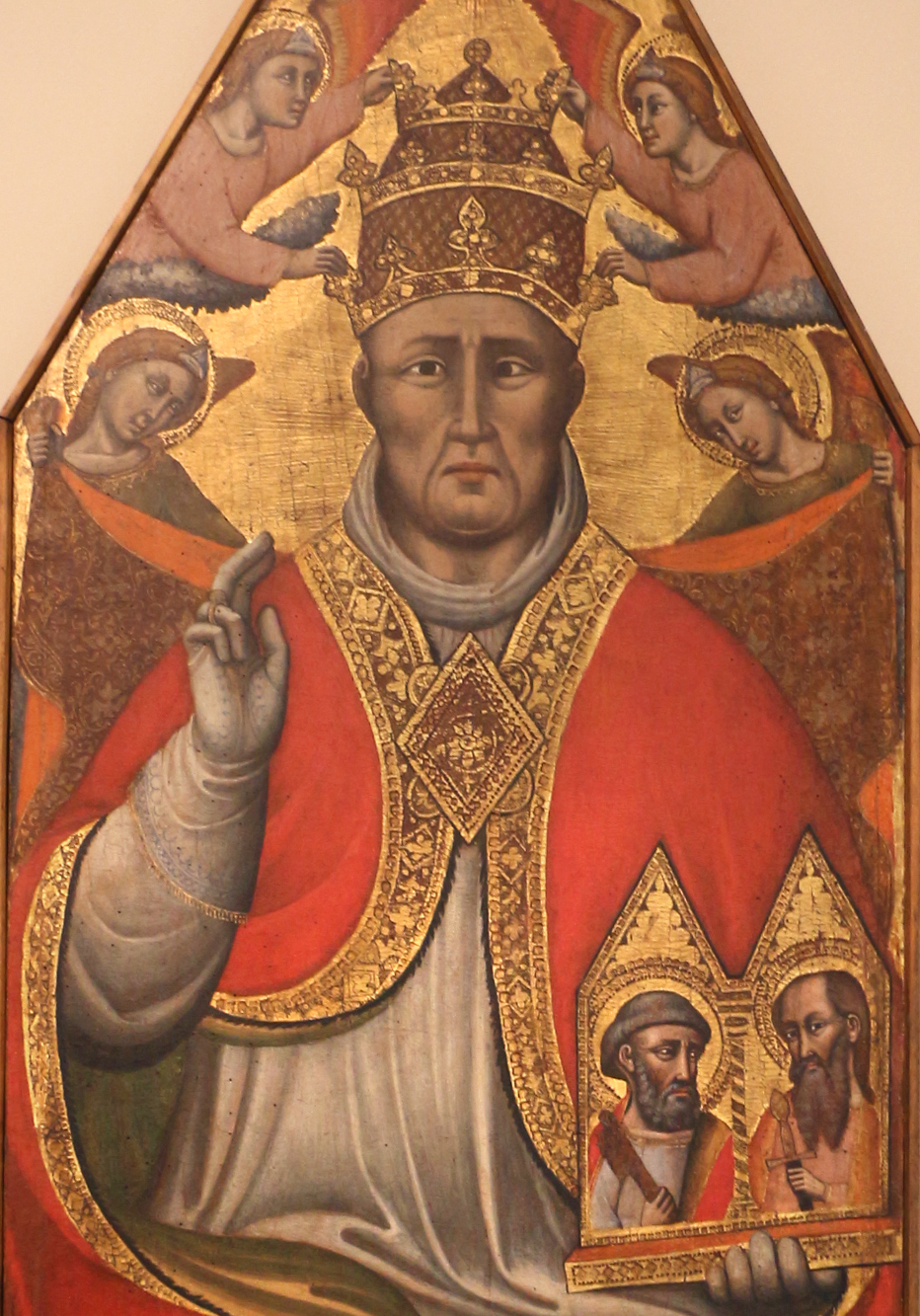
October 28: French diplomat Guillaume de Grimoard, the papal legate to Naples for Pope Innocent VI, is secretly elected as the new Pope, but not informed until being summoned by the Cardinals to Avignon; he takes the name Pope Urban V.

Year 1362 (MCCCLXII) was a common year starting on Saturday of the Julian calendar.

== Events ==
=== January–March ===
- January 1 – The Grand Duchy of Lithuania switches New Year to January 1, before any other country does.
- January 16 – The "Grote Mandrenke" storm tide kills more than 25,000 people after striking the Netherlands, England, Germany and Denmark on the feast day of Saint Marcellus, and destroying the Danish settlement of Rungholt in the Duchy of Schleswig, and the Humber estuary port of Ravenser Odd in England. The East Frisian island of Buise is broken into two islands by North Sea floods.
- February 7 – General Hu Dahai, the chief military adviser to the Chinese warlord Zhu Yuanzhang, the future Emperor of China and the ruler of most of the Anhui and Jiangsu provinces, is assassinated by General Jiang Ying after being lured to the city of Jinhua in the Zhejiang on the pretext of reviewing the troops. Distracting Hu, Jiang kills him with an iron hammer, as well as killing two other visitors, Hu Guanzhu and Geng Zaicheng.
- February 15 – King Haakon VI of Norway, son of King Magnus Eriksson of Sweden, proclaims himself king of Sweden in opposition to his father. However, later in the year, father and son are reconciled and rule Sweden together.
- March 13 – Sultan Muhammad V of Granada, returns to the throne after the usurper Muhammed VI flees the Alhambra and seeks asylum from King Pedro I of Castile.
- March 20 – Simon Sudbury is consecrated as the Bishop of London, serving in the office until becoming the Archbishop of Canterbury in 1375.
- March –
  - Murad I succeeds his father Orhan as sultan of the Ottoman Empire.
  - The nation of Champa (now in southern Vietnam), ruled by King Po Binasuor, raids the Hóa Châu prefecture of Đại Việt (now in northern Vietnam), then withdraws.

=== April–June ===
- April 6
  - Battle of Brignais: The Free Companies defeat a French army.
  - A fire destroys much of St Patrick's Cathedral in Dublin.
- April 17 – Kaunas Castle in Lithuania falls to the Teutonic Order, after a month-long siege.
- April 25 – After the former Sultan Muhammad VI of Granada arrives in the Crown of Castile, King Pedro I not only denies him asylum, but has him executed.
- May 1 – Ulrich IV, co-ruler with his brother Eberhard II as Count of Württemberg in Germany, is forced by the Holy Roman Emperor Charles IV to resign after his insistence that Württemberg be divided between the two counts. As compensation, Ulrich receives Hohenneuffen Castle and several towns and castles.
- May 26 – Giovanna I di Napoli becomes the sole ruler of the Kingdom of Naples after the death, from bubonic plague, of her husband, King Ludovico di Napoli, with whom she had allowed the sharing of power since their marriage in 1347.
- June 8 – Pir Husayn, ruler of Karahisar, invades the Emirate of Erzincan to confront the Emir Ahi Ayna.
- June 22 – An alliance is formed between the Kingdom of England and the Crown of Castile.
- June – Under the terms of the will of Sir John de Wingfield (died 1361), the church of St. Andrew and a college of priests are founded in Wingfield, Suffolk, England.

=== July–September ===
- July 3 – Ahi Ayna, the Emir of Erzincan and conqueror of much of eastern Turkey, the Kingdom of Georgia and the Kingdom of Trebizond and reportedly dies as a martyr after Pir Husayn's invasion of the emirate.
- July 8 – Valdemar IV of Denmark defeats the Hanseatic League in the naval Battle of Helsingborg.
- July 10 – Pir Husayn becomes the new Emir of Erzincan.
- August 14 – King Edward III summons the English Parliament members to assemble at Westminster on October 13.
- August 22 – In what is now Croatia, peace is concluded at Onogoste (now Nikšić in Montenegro) between he Republic of Ragusa and Prince Vojislav Vojinović of the Republic of Dubrovnik.
- September 7 – Joan, Queen of Scots, the Queen consort of Scotland, wife of King David II and sister of King Edward III of England, dies at Hertfordshire in England at the age of 41 after having been separated from David for many years.
- September 22 – A papal concave begins at the Palais des Papes in Avignon as 20 of the Roman Catholic cardinals meet to elect a successor to Pope Innocent VI, who had died on September 12.

=== October–December ===
- October 13 – The English Parliament is opened for the first time with a speech in English, as delivered by the Lord Chancellor, after having been opened for centuries with a speech in Latin. Under Edward III, the Pleading in English Act makes English rather than Law French the official language in English law courts. Sir Henry Green, Chief Justice of the King's Speech, is elected as the Speaker of the House of Lords.
- October 28 – Guillaume de Grimoard, the apostolic legate to the Kingdom of Naples, is selected in absentia as the new Pope of the Roman Catholic Church after 30 days of disagreements in Avignon on a successor, in that none of the proposed candidates receives the require two-thirds (14 of 20) necessary votes. Rather than informing Grimoard of his election, the cardinals send a message to Florence, stating that they wish to consult with him at Avignon, in that Grimoard (who wishes to keep the papacy at Avignon rather than returning it to Rome) might be detained by authorities in Italy. Grimoard reaches Avignon after nine days of travel from Florence, and takes the papal name of Pope Urban V.
- October 30 – The English Parliament ends its session after 17 days, and royal assent is given by King Edward III to laws passed therein, including the Purveyance Acts 1363, limiting government purchases to the King and Queen (or authorized representatives), and penalties for purveyors who violate the law, as well as the Parliament Act 1363 ("A parliament shall be holden once in the year.")
- November 6 – Pope Urban V is crowned after his arrival in Avignon and his consecration as a bishop of the Roman Catholic Church, after having been elected on October 28.
- November 13 – Lionel of Antwerp, the second son of King Edward III of England, is created Duke of Clarence. and John of Gaunt, King Edward's third son, is created Duke of Lancaster
- December 5 – The Battle of Launac is fought in France between Jean II, Count of Armagnac and Gaston III Febus, Count of Foix. Not only does Febus triumph in battle, supported by a archers for Foix who fire a volley of arrows into the Armagnac cavalry, Count Jean II and most of the Armagnac leaders are captured as prisoners of war and held for a total ransom of 600,000 gold florins, each with 3.5g of pure gold, equal to 2,100 kilograms (more than 74,000 ounces) of gold. Of this, 300,000 florins are paid for the release of Count Jean.
- December 21 – Constantine IV succeeds his cousin, Constantine III, as King of Armenia.

=== Date unknown ===
- Autumn 1362 or 1363 – Battle of Blue Waters: Grand Duke of Lithuania Algirdas defeats the Tatars, and takes over Kyiv.
- Red Turban Rebellions: Hu Dahai, aide to Zhu Yuanzhang, is killed by Miao chieftains in Yanzhou (part of modern-day Jinhua and Hangzhou). Chaghan Temur is killed and succeeded by his nephew Köke Temür.
- The Öræfajökull volcano erupts in Iceland, resulting in the destruction of the district of Litlahérað by flood and tephra fall.
- The English Hospice of the Most Holy Trinity and St Thomas is founded in Rome. It goes on to become the English College, a centre for training English priests in Rome.

== Births ==
- January 16 – Robert de Vere, 9th Earl of Oxford and Duke of Ireland (d. 1392)
- Empress Xu (Ming dynasty) of China (d. 1407)
- probable – Wang Fu, Chinese painter (d. 1416)
- date unknown
  - Adolf I, Count of Nassau-Siegen (d. 1420)
  - Murdoch Stewart, 2nd Duke of Albany (d. 1425)

== Deaths ==
- March – Orhan, Ottoman sultan (b. 1281)
- April 6 – James I, Count of La Marche, French soldier (b. 1319)
- April 10 – Maud, Countess of Leicester (b. 1339)
- May 26 – Louis of Taranto (b. 1320)
- July 11 – Anna von Schweidnitz, empress of Charles IV (b. 1339) (childbirth)
- July 22 – Louis of Durazzo, Italian soldier (poisoned) (b. 1324)
- September 7 – Joan of the Tower, Queen consort of king David II of Scotland (b. 1321)
- September 12 – Pope Innocent VI (b. 1282 or 1295)
- December 10 – Frederick III, Duke of Austria, second son of Duke Albert II of Austria (b. 1347)
- December 21 – Constantine III of Armenia (b. 1313)
- date unknown
  - Hu Dahai, Chinese general
  - Emperor John III of Trebizond
