= Ahmed bin Qutlugh =

Beg of Aq Qoyunlu from 1389 to 1403

Bey of Aq Qoyunlu
- Reign: 1389–1403
- Predecessor: Qutlugh bin Tur Ali
- Successor: Uthman Beg
- Died: 1403
- Dynasty: Aq Qoyunlu
- Father: Qutlugh bin Tur Ali
- Mother: Maria (daughter of Basil of Trebizond)

Ahmed bin Qutlugh (Azerbaijani and Persian: احمد بن قتلغ; died 1403), was the third bey of the Aq Qoyunlu confederation (1389–1403).

== Biography ==
Ahmad was the eldest of the four sons of Fakhr ud-Din Qutlug-Bey and Despina Khatun. In 1379, he was sent by his father to Erzincan to fend off an Eretnid attack by the sultan Ala al-Din Ali. The alliance was later sealed with a marriage between Ahmed's daughter and the Bey of Erzincan, Mutahhartan. Following this, Ahmad attacked Sivas killing a general of the Eretnid Qadi Burhaneddin. Unable to capture the city, he had to withdraw. In 1388, Ahmad pledged his loyalty to Burhaneddin, leaving his brother Kara Usman in Sivas as a hostage.

Ahmad had assumed the military leadership of the Aq Qoyunlu about ten years before his father, Qutlug-Bey's death. After the death of his father in 1389, Mutahhartan, with the backing of the Kara Koyunlu, broke their treaty. After losing a number of military encounters, Ahmed was forced to seek protection with Burhaneddin in Sivas. In alliance with Burhaneddin, he made campaigns against the rebellious vassals of Tokat and Amasia. At the same time, Ahmad managed to become the sole ruler of Aq Qoyunlu. In 1395, together with Qadi Burhaneddin, he attacked Erzincan, which was captured and plundered. Ahmad was given the city and territory including Bayburt.

In 1396, Kara Usman rebelled against Ahmad. Ahmad lost Burhaneddin's favor after fleeing Erzincan when he received word of Timur's approach. By 1403, Ahmad, considered a common outlaw, was imprisoned by Kara Usman.

== Sources ==
- Woods, John E. (1999). The Aqquyunlu: Clan, Confederation, Empire. The University of Utah Press.
