= Gadāʾī =

Central Asian poet of the 15th century

Gadāʼī (ɡadaːˈʔiː), or Gadā (Chagatay: كدا, [ɡadaː]), was a 15th-century poet of Central Asia who wrote in the Chaghatay Turkic language. He is recognised by the better-known Ali-Shir Nava'i as a predecessor, whom he had met.

== Life ==
Little is known about Gadāʼī's life. Based on information about him provided by Navaʼi in the third section of Majalis un-Nafāʼis (compiled in 1497 or 1498), which describes poets who were still alive and whom Navaʼi knew, it is possible to deduce that Gadāʼī was born around 1403 or 1404. However, based on other evidence, Ergash Rustamov concluded in the 1960s that Gadāʼī must have been born no later than 1360 and later served at the court of Abul-Qasim Babur Mirza at over 90 years of age.

== Name ==
The poet is referred to as Gadāʼī by Navāʼi, and in the one manuscript of his divans, as Gadā. This name, meaning "beggar", is understood to be a pen name. It is not known what his given name may have been.

== Works ==
Gadāʼī wrote a divan, or collection of poems, in what would now be considered the pre-classical Chaghatay literary language. At the time, this language was known as "Türkī", meaning "Turkish" or "Turkic". Rustamov highlights the fact that Gadāʼī was not a Sufi poet, and incorporated aspects of the local Turkic literary traditions into his work.

The single manuscript containing Gadāʼī's divan is housed in the Bibliothèque Nationale in Paris, and is composed of two halves: the first containing the Divan of Luṭfi (another 15th-century poet who wrote in Chaghatay), and the second containing the "Dīvān-i Gadā", on folios 96b through 161a. The last folio is missing, and may have included metadata about the manuscript, such as the name of the copyist and when it was copied.

The divan consists of mostly ghazals (229), but also five tuyughs, two qaṣīdas, and one mustazād.

== Research ==
The first mention of Gadāʼī in non-Chaghatay literature is thought to be in a 1914 work that mentions him by Mehmet Fuat Köprülü, a Turkish historian. Fuad provided more information about him in his history of Chaghatay literature in 1945. The Uzbek scholar Ergash Rustamov provides the first "scholarly appraisal" of Gadāʼi's work in a source published in the 1960s. János Eckmann published a translation of some of Gadāʼī's works in 1960, which formed the basis of Rustamov's work, and in 1971 published a complete transcription of Gadāʼī's divan, with facsimiles of all the folios, a glossary, and a brief introduction.
