= Tuyugh =

Form of Turkic poetry

A tuyugh is a classical form of poetry in Central Asia found in classical Turkic poetry. Poets to use this style include Ali-Shir Nava'i and Gadāʾī, who both wrote in Chaghatay.
