= Sharaf al-Din Sati =

Author, artisan, and mystic (died 1388)

Sharaf al-Din Sati (died 1388) was a Mevlevi Hanafi mystic, author, and manuscript producer based in Erzincan. He was born to Husam al-Din Hasan al-Mawlavi. Sati traced his origins to Konya. He was "probably" of Mongol origin, although its veracity is unclear. He had a son named Mustanjid and grandson Mu'tazid, who continued Sati's business of manuscript production and Mevlevi connections.

== Bibliography ==
- Jackson, Cailah (2024). Mevlevi Manuscripts, 1268–c. 1400: A Study of the Sources. Oxford: Palgrave Macmillan. ISBN 9783031483677. OCLC 1402246241.
- Peacock, Andrew Charles Spencer (17 October 2019). Islam, Literature and Society in Mongol Anatolia. Cambridge University Press. doi:10.1017/9781108582124. ISBN 9781108499361. OCLC 1124923987.
