= Bazm u Razm =

1398 work by Aziz ibn Ardashir Astarabadi

Bazm u Razm (lit. 'Banquets and Battles') was a work of history, written in Persian, by Aziz ibn Ardashir Astarabadi. It comprises the life, background, and the relations of Kadi Burhan al-Din, ruler of Sivas, who commissioned the work. Astarabadi included, in the work, his time at the court of Sultan Ahmad Jalayir and subsequent departure from the Jalayirid Sultanate after Timur's invasion.

== Contents ==
The Bazm u Razm highlights Astarabadi's flight from the Jalayirid court of Sultan Ahmad Jalayir following Timur's invasion of Persia in 1386. His accounts give a non-Timurid perspective of Sultan Ahmad's reign.

The Bazm u Razm is best understood as a political biography of Burhan al-Din, tracing his life from his birth into a family of jurists through his ascent to power and subsequent career. Its title(Banquets and Battles) suggests that it would contain abundant material on food, yet despite numerous descriptions of banquets, the Astarabadi’s use of stock phrases and ornate literary devices makes it nearly impossible to determine how food and drink were actually used at court. The work does, however, explains the impact on food-production systems in relation to army logistics. The first and only volume was completed in 1398.

== Language of work ==
Astarabadi explains why he wrote the Bazm u Razm in Persian, stating:

..the people of the country of Rum prefer the Persian language (zabān-i fārsī) and like it, and all the inhabitants of this land speak Dari (darī qāyil va nāṭiq), and all the proverbs, orders, correspondence, accounting, registers, laws and so on are in this language.

== Bibliography ==
- Peacock, A.C.S. (2024). "Persian in the Lands of Rum: Texts, Translations and Courtly Patronage". DIYÂR. 5(2):January: 124–143. doi:10.5771/2625-9842-2024-2-124.
- Trépanier, Nicolas (2014). Foodways and Daily Life in Medieval Anatolia: A New Social History. University of Texas Press. ISBN 9780292759299.
- Wing, Patrick (2016). Jalayirids: Dynastic State Formation in the Mongol Middle East. Edinburgh University Press. ISBN 9781474402262.
- Yazıcı, Tahsin (1995). "Esterâbâdî, Azîz b. Erdeşîr". TDV Encyclopedia of Islam, Vol. 11 (Elbi̇stan – Eymi̇r) (in Turkish). Istanbul: Turkiye Diyanet Foundation, Centre for Islamic Studies. p. 438. ISBN 978-975-389-438-8.
