= Abu Bakr Qutbi =

14th-century Iranian historian

Abu Bakr Qutbi Ahari was a 14th-century historian, who authored Tarikh-e Shaykh Uways, a historical work on Shaykh Uways Jalayir (r. 1356–74). Qutbi was from Ahar in the region of Azerbaijan.

== Sources ==
- Aka, Ismail (15 December 1984). "Aharī, Abu-Bakr Qotbī". In Yarshater, Ehsan (ed.). Encyclopædia Iranica. London and New York: Routledge & Kegan Paul. p. 634.
