= Çaltı, İliç =

Village in Turkey

Çaltı
- Village
- Location in Turkey
- Coordinates: 39.4555°N 38.5980°E
- Country: Turkey
- Province: Erzincan
- District: İliç
- Population (2022): 417
- Time zone: UTC+3 (TRT)

Çaltı is a village in the İliç District of Erzincan Province in Turkey. Its population is 417 (2022).
