= Atskuri Fortress =

Is a Georgian feudal fortress

Coordinates: 41°43′42″N 43°09′56″E

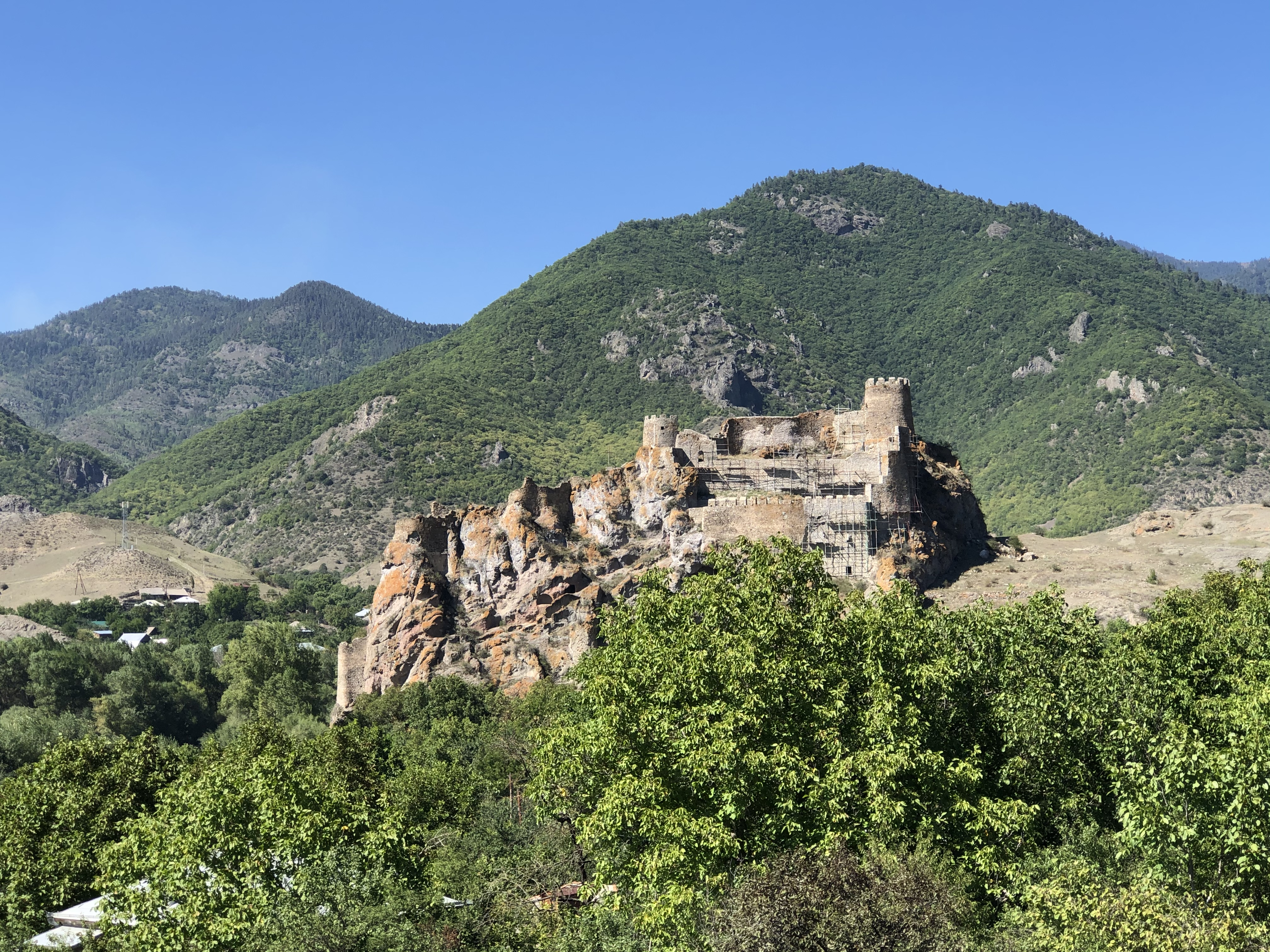
Remnants of Atskuri Fortress viewed from a nearby hill

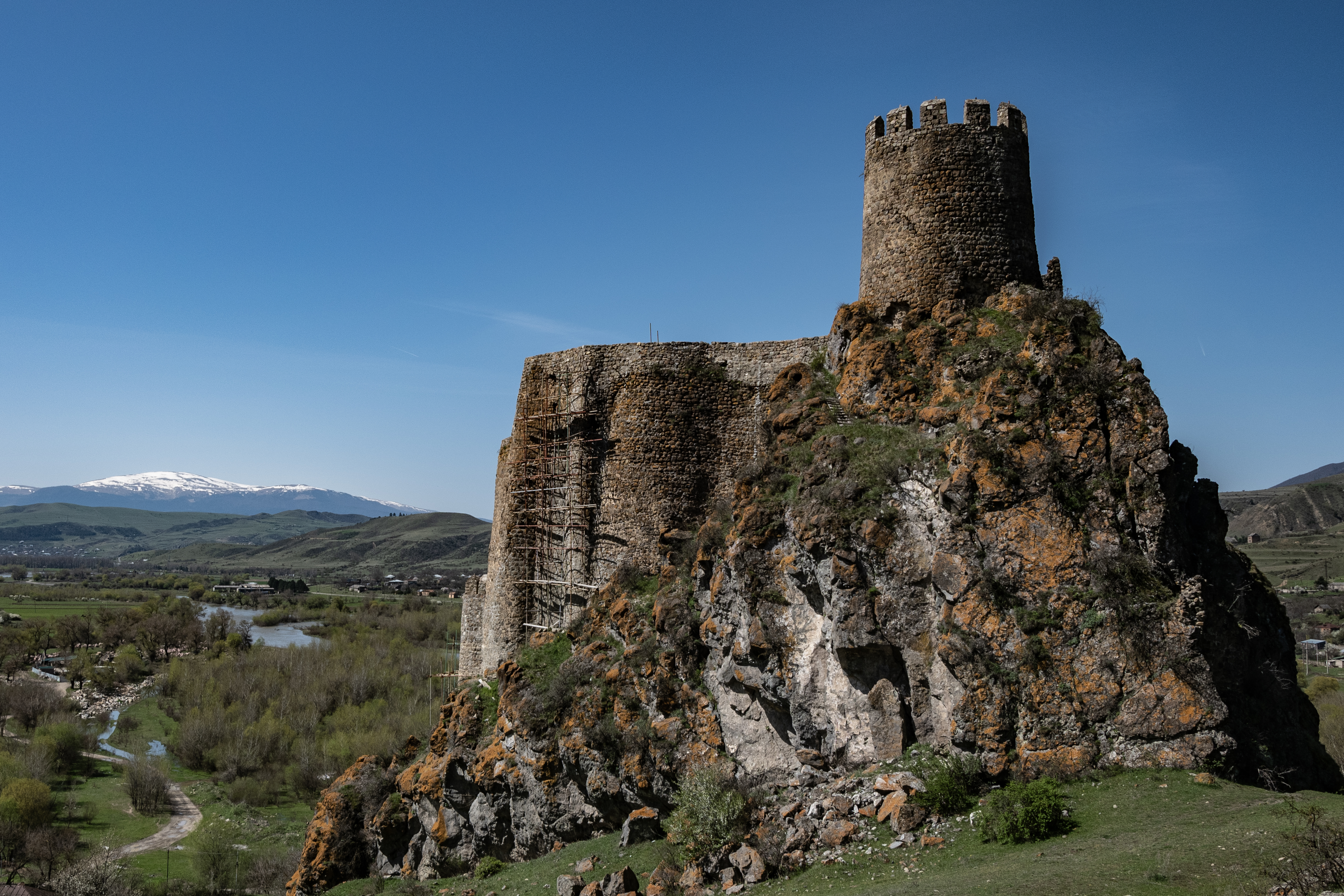
Tower of Atskuri Fortress, with the snow-capped Caucasus mountains and a river basin in the background.

Atskuri (Georgian: აწყურის ციხე) is a Georgian feudal fortress on the right bank of the Mtkvari (Kura) River, approximately 30 kilometres from Borjomi, in the Samtskhe-Javakheti region.

Built in the 9th century, Atskuri Fortress was an important stronghold for the defense of Georgia during the Middle Ages.

== History ==
The fortress was probably situated near the town of Atskuri, of which no traces have been found. First mentioned in the 9th century, the fortress was significantly damaged in the 16th century, when it was occupied by the Turks. It was rebuilt in the 17-18th centuries. In the 1820s the fortress was abandoned.

== Architecture ==
Set atop a high cliff, the fortress occupies a vast area, and is made of several parts, with the citadel at its highest point. The fortress territory also includes ruins of a church with remnants of frescoes. A water-supply tunnel connects the fortress with the river.

== See also ==
- Atsquri church
