= Kadi Burhan al-Din =

Poet and statesman (1345–1398)

Burhān al-Dīn
- Qadi; Atabeg; Sultan

Ruler of the Kadi Burhan al-Din State
- Reign: 1381–1398
- Born: 8 January 1345; Kayseri
- Died: c. 1398 (aged 52–53); Erzincan
- Father: Shams al-Din Muhammad
- Religion: Sunni Islam

Kadi Ahmad Burhan al-Din (8 January 1345, Kayseri – c. 1398, Sivas) (Note: Turkish: Kadı Burhâneddin; Azerbaijani: Qazi Bürhanəddin.) was a Turcoman poet, scholar, and statesman. He was vizier to the Eretnid rulers of Anatolia. In 1381, he took over Eretnid lands and claimed the title of sultan for himself. He is most often referred to by the title Qadi, a title for Islamic judges, which was his first occupation.

To maintain the independence of his principality, he fought against the Ottomans, Mamluks, Karamanids, and Aq Qoyunlu for 18 years. He composed poetry in a Turkic language close to modern Azerbaijani Turkic. In addition to his poems in Turkic, he also wrote in Persian and Arabic and conducted studies on Islamic law. His divan is regarded as the first divan written in the Turkic language. He is considered one of the founders of modern Azerbaijani and Turkish literature, playing a significant role in the development of poetry in the Azerbaijani Turkic language.

On May 7, 2019, by Decision No. 211 of the Cabinet of Ministers of the Republic of Azerbaijan, Qadi Burhan al-Din was included in the list of authors whose works are declared state property in the Republic of Azerbaijan.

== Early life and education ==
The first ancestor of Burhan al-Din who migrated to Anatolia was a Khwarezmian named Muhammad Rasul Sevinc. He belonged to the Salur tribe of the Oghuz Turks. Aziz al-Astarabadi records Burhan al-Din's lineage as follows: Shams al-Din Muhammad, son of Suleyman Siraj al-Din, son of Husam al-Din, son of Jalal al-Din Habib, son of Muhammad, son of Rasul, son of Sevinc. Burhan al-Din's great-grandfather was born around the 1290s in the Kastamonu region. He gained recognition from the qadi of Kayseri, who arranged his marriage to his daughter, which subsequently earned him an official position. According to Aziz al-Astarabadi, many of his descendants also served as qadis. Thus, Burhan al-Din's family upheld the position of qadi for generations. A. Krymsky described Burhan al-Din as "the son, grandson, great-grandson, and great-great-grandson of a qadi." Additionally, Burhan al-Din’s great-grandfather married a woman from the Seljuk dynasty, and his son Suleyman Siraj al-Din became a highly respected figure. As a result, Suleyman married the daughter of the last Sultan of the Seljuks of Konya. His son, Shams al-Din Muhammad, adhered to family tradition and served as a qadi in Kayseri. Ibn Arabshah, while writing about the rulers of the Eretnids, also mentioned Burhan al-Din's father, noting that he was one of the viziers of the Eretnid ruler and described him as the most powerful among them.

Burhan al-Din was born on the 3rd of Ramadan, corresponding to January 8, 1345. His mother came from a noble family and was related to Sultan Ghiyath al-Din Kaykhusraw of the Seljuks. Burhan al-Din’s maternal grandfather, Abdullah Chalabi, was a vizier and the son of the prominent Seljuk bureaucrat Jalal al-Din Mahmud Mustawfi. According to Abdullah ibn Ali Kashani, the author of "Tarikh-e Olcaytu", Burhan al-Din’s mother was also the sister of the Eretnid ruler. She died when Burhan al-Din was only one and a half years old. As a result, he was raised and educated under the guidance of his father. In his youth, Burhan al-Din mastered Persian and Arabic, as well as disciplines such as Islamic law, logic, horsemanship, swordsmanship, and archery.

In 1356, Burhan al-Din accompanied his father to Damascus for educational purposes. Two years later, they traveled to Cairo. Historians believe this journey may have been prompted by political reasons, possibly due to his father's exile or forced departure from Kayseri. In Cairo, Burhan al-Din studied jurisprudence, hadith, and Quranic exegesis. Later, in 1362, he returned to Damascus to study poetry under Qutb al-Din al-Razi for a year and a half. After the death of Qutb al-Din in 1364, Burhan al-Din's father also died shortly thereafter. Following the deaths of his father and teacher, Burhan al-Din returned to his hometown.

After his return to Kayseri in 1364, the Eretnid ruler Muhammad Bey appointed him as qadi and arranged his marriage to his daughter. In 1365, Muhammad Bey died under unclear circumstances. Some speculate he was killed during a campaign to suppress rebellions in Amasya (led by Haji Shadgeldi), Milas (led by Haji Amir Ibrahim), or Karahisar (led by Kılıç Arslan). Others suggest he may have been assassinated due to political conflicts. Burhan al-Din's role in these events remains unknown. The renowned Scottish orientalist E. Gibb, citing Ibn Hajar, notes that Burhan al-Din married the ruler's daughter, but their relationship eventually soured, leading Burhan al-Din to kill his father-in-law and seize power.

At the time of Muhammad Bey’s death, his son Alaeddin Ali was only 13 years old and thus incapable of governing effectively. Taking advantage of the ensuing instability, the Karamanids captured Niğde and Aksaray. In 1375, Alaeddin Bey of the Karamanids seized Kayseri, forcing Alaeddin Ali to flee to Sivas. In 1378, Burhan al-Din reclaimed Kayseri and expelled Alaeddin Karamanid. Consequently, Alaeddin Ali appointed Burhan al-Din as his vizier. However, Burhan al-Din’s aspirations for power created tensions between them. Burhan al-Din ultimately emerged victorious in this struggle, consolidating both military and political control. His authority was solidified when he was granted the title of beylerbeyi or malik al-umara, titles previously used during the Seljuk era.

During his tenure as vizier, Burhan al-Din implemented measures to stabilize the region. A conflict arose between Burhan al-Din and Emir Haji Shadgeldi over the control of Amasya, which the latter had seized from Alaeddin Eretnid. In 1380, Alaeddin Ali succumbed to the plague in Kazabad. At the time of his death, his son was only seven years old. Although a public assembly urged Burhan al-Din to govern the state as regent, he declined. Consequently, the regency was entrusted to Kılıç Arslan, who was from the Seljuk dynasty and had married Alaeddin Ali’s widow. However, this decision caused widespread discontent, as many believed Burhan al-Din was better suited for leadership. Alarmed by Burhan al-Din’s growing influence, Kılıç Arslan plotted to eliminate him. However, Burhan al-Din acted first, killing Kılıç Arslan on February 19, 1381. Following this event, the public assembly once again supported Burhan al-Din, and he assumed the regency. Later that year, Burhan al-Din defeated his main rival, Haji Shadgeldi of Amasya, and declared his sovereignty in Sivas. After delivering a khutbah in his name, he sent envoys to rulers across Anatolia, Syria, and Iraq to announce his ascension to power.

== Sources ==
Aziz ibn Ardashir Astrabadi (also known as Abdulaziz Baghdadi) served as the court poet of Qadi Burhan al-Din and authored the work Bazm wa Razm. In this work, he provided information about Burhan al-Din, his patron. This work was utilized by the renowned 15th-century Arab historian Ibn Hajar (1372–1448). Ibn Hajar's work, in turn, was referenced by the 16th-century Ottoman historian Daskopruzade. The famous orientalist E.J.W. Gibb, in his work, benefited from the materials that Daskopruzade had derived from Ibn Hajar.

Another source providing information about Burhan al-Din's life is the work of Ibn Arabshah (1392–1450), a scholar from Damascus. Ibn Arabshah, who spent many years in captivity under Timur, later wrote his own biography. Krimski notes that, curiously, Gibb did not use or was unaware of Ibn Arabshah's work, which contains considerable information about Burhan al-Din. Additionally, Ibn Arabshah was familiar with the work of Aziz ibn Ardashir, noting that it was preserved in Karaman and consisted of four volumes.

The description of Burhan al-Din’s execution and the annexation of his state by the Ottoman Empire can be found in the memoirs of Johannes Schiltberger, who was captured by the Ottomans at the Battle of Nicopolis (1396). Schiltberger participated in the Ottoman campaign that annexed Sivas and provides details about these events.

The correspondence between Kadi Burhan al-Din and rulers of neighboring states, as well as between those rulers themselves, also serves as a valuable source of information about his life and activities.

== Historical Context ==
In the early 14th century, the Anatolian Seljuks, centered in Konya, fell under the pressure of the Ilkhanate. Following their collapse, various beyliks emerged in their place. In 1335, Eretna Bey, one of the Ilkhanid governors in Anatolia, declared his independence. However, he temporarily accepted vassalage to the Mamluk Sultan. The initial capital of the Eretnid Beylik was Erzincan, later moving to Kayseri. During this period, the newly formed beyliks frequently engaged in conflicts with one another over territorial disputes. The Eretnid Beylik was governed by Eretna Bey's descendants until 1381, when Qadi Burhan al-Din declared himself an independent ruler.

== Rise to power ==
Although he was favored by the sultan, Burhan al-Din secretly participated in the rebellion of the local magnates which led to Ghiyath al-Din's killing in 1365. Burhan al-Din's popularity spread as he was serving as the qadi of Kayseri, bolstering his political strength. He built strong personal relations, especially with local nomadic tribes. By 1376, he had become a military commander with significant power in a realm that was facing political turmoil. The previous year, Karamanids captured Kayseri in a surprise attack with the help of the Mongol tribes of Samargar and Chaykazan, prompting Ala al-Din Ali to flee to Sivas. Burhan al-Din tried to fend off the Karamanids with the hopes that he could claim Kayseri for himself. He wasn't successful, getting arrested when Ali uncovered his true intentions. The Emir of Sivas, Hajji Ibrahim, who allied with the leader of Samargar, Khidr Beg, rescued Burhan al-Din and imprisoned Ali instead. Ali was eventually liberated by Burhan al-Din in 1378. In June of that year, Burhan al-Din was made vizier by Eretnid emirs in order to prevent a possible revolt of peasants disgruntled by Ali's incompetence.

== Reign ==
Referring to Sa'd al-Din Efendi, Gibb mentions that Burhan al-Din captured Sivas and Kayseri and ruled for 20–30 years. However, this is an exaggeration. Based on information from sources, it becomes evident that Burhan al-Din ruled for either 17 or 18 years. His years of rule were marked by continuous conflicts with rebellious local rulers as well as struggles against powerful states such as the Ottomans, Mamluks, and Aq Qoyunlus.

In 1381, after murdering the naib (deputy) of the ruler of Eretna, he formally proclaimed himself the ruler, initially using the title atabeg and later sultan. He issued his own coins and had the khuṭba delivered in his name. He was continuously involved in skirmishes with neighboring states. He gained many enemies with his rise to power, including the Mamluk Sultanate, Ottoman Empire, Aq Qoyunlu, Qara Qoyunlu, Karamanids, and local emirs, such as those of Amasya and Erzincan, one of whom, Mutahharten, was a worthy rival. To reduce the number of his opponents, Burhan al-Din pardoned many of whom he had defeated. He followed no set principle but only the benefit of his political existence in forging relations with neighboring powers. The sultanate Burhan al-Din usurped had a large Turkmen and Mongol population but also consisted of many of the older, established urban centers of the Seljuk and Ilkhanid Anatolia. His sultanate resembled these states more than the Turcoman beyliks.

In 1383, Burhan al-Din survived an assassination attempt by some local beys in Sivas. To avenge his father, Haji Shadgeldi, he received support from his father-in-law, Candaroglu Kötürüm Bayezid, and defeated Burhan al-Din, who had taken action against him (785/1383–84). Subsequently, by collaborating with the Beylik of Dulkadir and forming regular military units, he brought the Turcomans in the region stretching from Sivas to the Mediterranean under his control. After eliminating the threats posed by the Turcomans and Mongols, he married off his sister to the lord of Tokat Fortress, and with their support, launched a campaign against Amasya, defeating its rulers consecutively (1384).

Candaroglu Kötürüm Bayezid, aware of a potential Ottoman campaign led by Sultan Murad I against them, sent a message to Burhan al-Din, expressing his desire for an alliance. However, when his insincerity was realized, he not only lost the support of Burhan al-Din, a strong ally, but also his throne (1384). Around the same time, the governor of Tokat Fortress came to Sivas to pledge allegiance to Burhan al-Din. In 1387, while Burhan al-Din was in Kösedağ, he learned that the people of Sivas had revolted. He dispatched one of his commanders, who successfully suppressed the uprising.

Burhan al-Din skillfully exploited the conflicting claims of the local rulers in his vicinity, supporting one against the other. He also strengthened his army by recruiting men from the nomadic Turkcoman and Mongol tribes. He successfully restored the former borders of his beylik but faced conflicts with the Mamluks after capturing Malatya, as it was traditionally considered within the Mamluk sphere of influence. According to Ibn Hajar, in response to the capture of Malatya, a large Mamluk army was dispatched against him. Acting in alliance with some Anatolian rulers, the Mamluk army laid siege to Sivas for several months in 1388 but failed to defeat Burhan al-Din. Subsequently, Sultan Barquq of the Mamluks was forced to sign a peace treaty with him.

In 1389, Ottoman Sultan Murad I was killed in the Battle of Kosovo. His successor, Bayezid I, immediately headed to Bursa, as the vassal rulers in Anatolia had risen in rebellion. The coalition against the Ottomans included the beyliks of Karaman, Aydın, Saruhan, Menteşe, Germiyan, and Hamid. The coalition leaders were Karamanoglu Alaeddin and Burhan al-Din. Alaeddin occupied Beyşehir and advanced as far as Eskişehir, Germiyanoglu Yakub II reclaimed his territories, while Burhan al-Din captured Kırşehir. In May 1390, Bayezid, preparing for a campaign against the Karamanids in Afyonkarahisar, recaptured Beyşehir and laid siege to Konya. Meanwhile, Süleyman Bey of the Candarids returned to Kastamonu and formed an alliance with Burhan al-Din to assist the Karamanids. This threat seemingly forced Bayezid to lift the siege of Konya and sign a peace treaty with the Karamanids. In 1391/92, Bayezid targeted Süleyman Bey, but Burhan al-Din intervened to support his ally. On April 6, 1392, a Venetian report noted that Byzantine Emperor Manuel II, as an Ottoman vassal, was preparing to join a naval expedition against Sinop. This campaign resulted in the annexation of most Candarid territories, except Sinop. Süleyman Bey was killed. Later, despite Burhan al-Din's objections and threats, Bayezid occupied Osmancık. However, Burhan al-Din eventually launched an attack against Bayezid near Çorumlu, forcing him to retreat. Burhan al-Din advanced as far as Ankara and Sivrihisar. Ahmed, the emir of Amasya, besieged by Burhan al-Din’s forces, sought Ottoman assistance and handed over his fortress to the Ottomans (1392). This incident is also mentioned in the memoirs of the captive soldier Schiltberger, who was in Bayezid’s service.

In 1391/92, the Battle of Kırkdilim took place. Burhan al-Din’s court poet, Aziz ibn Ardashir, claims that Burhan al-Din emerged victorious in this battle. However, letters from Manuel II Paleologus, who participated in the campaign as Bayezid’s vassal, suggest otherwise. The local rulers recognized Bayezid as their overlord, but as the army retreated, they were attacked by Burhan al-Din’s forces.

Burhan al-Dīn was defeated by the Mamluks in 1387 but soon allied with them against the Aq Qoyunlu, only to later ally with the latter against rebellions of the beys of Amasya and Erzincan.

In 1393, the rulers of the Tacettinids, Tashanids, and Bafra pledged allegiance to Burhan al-Din. That same year, Mongol rulers in Anatolia encouraged him to attack the Ottomans, but his advisors rejected this proposal. Concerned about Ottoman dominance over the Yeşilırmak basin, Burhan al-Din took measures to counter this and encouraged the Ottomans to move southward. By 1393, Burhan al-Din’s state had become the strongest rival to the Ottoman Empire in Anatolia. Consequently, the Anatolian emirates divided into two factions: one supporting Burhan al-Din and the other supporting the Ottomans. That same year, Bayezid launched several campaigns against him, capturing some fortresses and cities. In 1394, Burhan al-Din campaigned against the Karamanids. During this time, the Anatolian rulers received a letter from Timur, who had captured Tikrit in 1394, demanding their submission.

Burhan al-Din executed the envoys who came to him with this letter. Sources indicate that he beheaded some of Timur’s envoys, hung their heads around the necks of the survivors, and sent them back to their lands. When Burhan al-Din rejected Timur's letter, he sent a copy of it to the Mamluk Sultan Barquq and Bayezid I. Thus, the alliance between him and the Mamluk Sultan also included the Ottoman Sultan and the Golden Horde Khan, Tokhtamysh. To disrupt this alliance, Timur set out and entered Anatolia in early 1394, reaching Erzurum. However, he suddenly decided to turn back from Erzurum. When the threat of Timur subsided for a while, Qadi Burhan al-Din launched a campaign against Ahmad Bey, the Emir of Amasya, who had attacked his lands, and devastated the region. Timur was aware of Qadi Burhan al-Din's activities against him. Taking advantage of this, Alaeddin Bey of the Karamanids declared his allegiance to Timur and became his ally. Thus, Burhan al-Din, the ruler of Sivas, found himself caught between two enemies. Consequently, in 1397, he sought assistance from his former adversary, the Mamluk Sultan, offering to become a Mamluk vassal in return. At the same time, he needed support to counter the advancing Aq Qoyunlu ruler, Kara Yuluk Osman Bey. Timur was aware of Qadi Burhan al-Din's activities against him. Timur, in a letter to Bayezid, also mentioned Burhan al-Din’s alliance with the Mamluk Sultan, his former enemy. In his letter to Bayezid I, Timur also mentioned Burhan al-Din and his alliance with his former enemy, the Mamluk Sultan:

The wretched son of the judge of Sivas devises devilish schemes and seeks to cooperate with the Circassian youth.

However, it is evident from one of Qadi Burhan al-Din's poems that he did not care for these threats and was not afraid of Timur:

When Sham and Rum submit to us,

We are iron for the enemy, mildly for our friends. Brave men tread our paths;

For friends, we are a blessing; for foes, a doom.

With the help of Barquq, Burhan al-Din was able to overcome his enemies. Later, Burhan al-Din formed an alliance with Qara Yuluk Osman Bey of the Aq Qoyunlu and conducted campaigns against rebellious emirs in Amasya and Erzincan.

However, it is apparent from his poems that Burhan al-Din did not hold Tokhtamysh Khan in high regard, but due to their common enemy, Timur, he entered into an alliance with him:

Whatever God has decreed from the beginning shall happen;

The eye sees only what it is destined to see. In both worlds, we have sought refuge in God.

What is Tokhtamysh, or even Aksak Timur?

=== Death ===
In 1398, Burhan al-Din was killed in the Karabel region during a battle with Qara Yuluk Osman. The Ottoman historian Saadeddin Efendi mentions that this event occurred in the Harput Mountains, where Burhan al-Din had taken refuge from Sultan Bayezid I. Although Burhan al-Din's son, Zeynal, ruled the principality between 1398 and 1399, the Ottomans soon captured Sivas.

Schiltberger and Ibn Arabshah describe the events surrounding Burhan al-Din's death. According to them, a conflict arose between Qara Yoluq Osman and Burhan al-Din due to Osman's failure to fulfill agreed nomadic migration conditions. Qara Yuluk Osman launched a sudden attack on Burhan al-Din's camp, forcing him to flee. However, Burhan al-Din was captured before he could escape. Osman besieged Sivas, demanding its surrender from Burhan al-Din's son. When the request was denied, Osman executed Burhan al-Din.

Despite Burhan al-Din’s appeals for clemency and his offer to hand over Kayseri, he was executed. His body was dismembered into four parts, with each part displayed on poles, and his head placed on a spear outside the city.

Burhan al-Din's son sought help from Bayezid I, who dispatched his eldest son with an army of 40,000 troops. Consequently, the territories of the Burhan al-Din state came under Bayezid’s control. Schiltberger, who participated in this campaign, writes, “I too took part in this expedition.” According to Schiltberger and Ibn Arabshah, Burhan al-Din was executed in the Islamic month of Dhu al-Qa‘dah, corresponding to July–August 1398. However, other sources suggest alternative dates. After analyzing the historical records, F. K. Brun concluded that 1398 is the most accurate date. While the exact burial site remains uncertain, it is believed that Burhan al-Din was interred in the location known as the Tomb of Qazi Burhan al-Din in Sivas. His gravestones are preserved in the Gök Madrasa. According to the Encyclopaedia of Islam, the tomb in Sivas, still standing today, does not bear an inscription indicating the date of his death.

== Poetry ==
He was an outstanding poet, who wrote in Turkish and Persian. He played significant role in the development of the Azerbaijani poetry. His diwan comprises 1,500 ghazals, 119 tuyughs, and a few distichs. According to Jan Rypka, he was "a poet of profane love; mystical notes are sounded more rarely in his work". Despite his ability, he was relatively unknown, and his work had little influence on later Azerbaijani or Ottoman poetry. According to the Turkish scholar Mehmet Fuat Köprülü, Burhan al-Din's works "have all the peculiarities of the Azerbaijani dialect." Turkish historian and linguist Muharrem Ergin states that, despite being written in Anatolia, the works by Burhan al-Din fall within the realm of the Azerbaijani language due to their linguistic peculiarities.

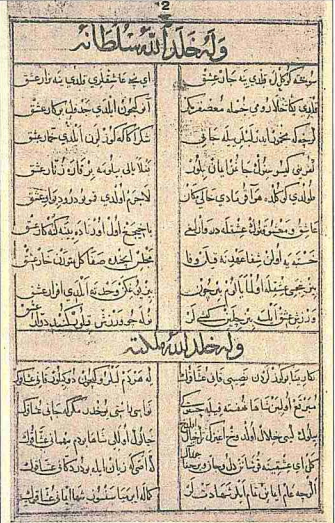
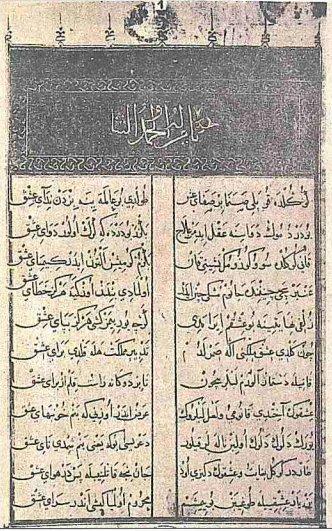
Diwan of Qāḍī Burhān al-Dīn

Numerous studies have been conducted on the life, activities, personality, and state governance of Qazi Burhaneddin, as well as on the research and publication of his literary legacy. Particularly noteworthy is the work "Bazm ve Razm" by Aziz ibn Ardashir Astarabadi, who served as Burhan al-Din’s historian from 1394 onward. Valuable information about Qadi Burhan al-Din is also found in Ibn Ardashir’s Ajaib al-Maqdur, as well as in sources related to the Anatolian Seljuks, the Beyliks, the Timurid period, and the Aq Qoyunlu, alongside accounts from Arabic and Ottoman histories. Nevertheless, medieval sources primarily focus on Burhan al-Din’s political, diplomatic, and military activities, his campaigns, the structure of his state, and his relations with other states and tribes. His poetic endeavors, however, were placed in the background. In fact, his artistic achievements were of little significance to medieval authors. This is naturally linked to the perception of Burhan al-Din as a statesman and ruler, as his works were more closely associated with history rather than literary studies. Chroniclers and historians such as Taşköprüzade in Shaqaiq al-Numaniyya, Khoja Sadeddin in Taj al-Tavarikh, and Katib Chelebi in Kashf al-Zunun discuss Burhan al-Din solely as a poet.

=== Research ===
The study of Burhan al-Din as an artist and the analysis of his literary legacy mainly belong to recent periods. His introduction to Russian, European, and English-speaking audiences owes much to scholars such as P. Melioranski, A. Krymsky, H. Gibb, L. Levonian, F. Goadsell, and A. Bombaci. In 1895, P. Melioranski published an article titled "Excerpts from the Divan of Burhan al-Din of Sivas" in the journal Vostochnyye Zametki. In this article, he translated 12 tuyuqs and 20 rubais into Russian and provided valuable insights into the poet’s life and work. The renowned British Orientalist H. Gibb introduced European readers to Qazi Burhaneddin’s life and creative work for the first time in his 1900 publication A History of Ottoman Literature. Similarly, F. Goadsell, director of a language school in America, wrote an article about the Azerbaijani poet, analyzing his tuyuqs and highlighting the poet’s skill in this genre. Şehabeddin, in his introduction to Goadsell’s work, examined Burhan al-Din’s life, era, and creative journey, arriving at new conclusions.

The study of Burhan al-Din’s literary legacy in Turkish literary scholarship began in the 20th century. Scholars such as Ş. Süleyman, M. F. Köprülü, Y. Kabaklı, N. S. Banarlı, A. Alpaslan, S. Nüzhet, and M. Ergin emphasized his unique position in the history of Turkic literature, characterizing him as a ruler-poet who wrote on worldly themes with an optimistic spirit. M. F. Köprülü, in an article published in Dergah Mecmuası, praised Burhan al-Din for writing ghazals on secular themes rather than religious ones. In the preface to the 1924 publication Divan-i Fuzuli, Köprülü analyzed the stylistic and thematic features of Burhan al-Din’s poetry, stating:

Despite the primitiveness and vibrancy of its form and language, there is a sincere and vivid uniqueness in his works. His poems reflect the transience of the world and the unity of the beloved and the lover, showing some influence of Persian mystics. At the same time, his verses contain heartfelt national concepts derived from everyday life, and beneath these crude lines lies the spirit of a courageous warrior.

According to Köprülü, the emotions and thoughts of ordinary people are vividly expressed in Burhan al-Din’s ghazals. In the preface to his 1926 book "Turkish Poetry from Its Origins to the Tenth Hijri Century", Köprülü described Burhan al-Din as a creator of worldly and realistic poetry.

The Turkish scholar Y. Yücel authored a fundamental work titled "Qazi Burhaneddin Ahmed and His State", focusing primarily on his socio-political and military activities as a ruler, with only passing references to his poetic endeavors. Based on historical sources, this monograph holds significant scholarly value. Turkish scholar Vasfi Mahir Kocatürk portrayed Burhan al-Din as a mentor to master poets like Nasimi and Nava’i. He demonstrated, using literary examples, that Nasimi wrote naziras and responses to Burhan al-Din’s poems, learning from the artistic beauty of his works. Kocatürk concluded that Nasimi’s poetic language is an evolved version of Burhan al-Din’s poetic style. Literary critic Y. Kabaklı described Burhaneddin as a “commander-poet who expressed heroism, love, and mysticism with fiery enthusiasm,” presenting his creative legacy as a new manifestation of national poetic traditions in the literature of Turkic peoples.

In Azerbaijani literature, the exploration and promotion of Burhan al-Din’s artistic heritage began with M. F. Köprülü and were later continued by I. Hikmət. Although Köprülü briefly discussed the poet in "Studies in Azerbaijani Literature", I. Hikmət authored a comprehensive essay on him, analyzing Burhan al-Din’s life, creative work, themes, and linguistic features of his poetry. The poet’s unique role in the development of the Tuyuq genre in Azerbaijani literature was especially highlighted.

Burhan al-Din’s poetic works have been published in various compilations across different countries. His divan was first published in facsimile form by the Turkish Language Association in Istanbul in 1943, and in 1980, Turkish scholar M. Ergin published the complete divan. In Baku, selections from his poetry and his divan have been published multiple times, with A. Safarli as the compiler of these editions. In addition to these copies, a manuscript consisting of 19 lines and 65 leaves (the end is missing) kept in the Süleymaniye Manuscript Library, Carullah Efendi collection, has the author's name written as Hamiduddin Sivasi on the inner cover and is included in the catalog as such. When compared with the two existing copies, it was determined that this work is another writing of "Terci ut-tövzih".

=== Works ===
Burhan al-Din authored works on Islamic law and poetry, among which his most renowned piece is Tarjih al-Tawzih ("The Reiteration of Clarifications"), written in Arabic. This book, addressing the principles of jurisprudence, serves as an annotation to a larger work titled Talmih. Remarkably, the work was written without referencing any other books, relying solely on logical reasoning, and it stands out as a significant intellectual contribution authored by a ruler.

One copy of this manuscript is preserved in the Ragıp Paşa Library under catalog number 831, with notes indicating it was completed in 800 AH/1398 AD. Another copy, consisting of 169 folios with 19 lines per page, is located in the Millet Feyzullah Efendi collection under catalog number 585.

Burhan al-Din also authored a Sufi treatise titled "Elixir of Happiness in the Mysteries of Worship" (İksir əs-Səadət fi Əsrar əl-İbadət), which he referred to in Arabic as "Sa'adat al-iksir fi asrar al-ibadah" ("The Elixir of Happiness in the Mysteries of Worship"). During the years 1395–1396, which he spent in Sivas, Burhan al-Din engaged in addressing state and public affairs arising from ongoing military campaigns. In his remaining time, he completed this treatise. The work has not been published. The only known Arabic manuscript is preserved at the Ayasofya section of the Süleymaniye Library under inventory number 1658. This manuscript consists of 176 folios, each containing nine lines. The text, written in the naskh script, is fully vowelized. Marginal and upper-page notes occasionally provide additional explanations or grammatical clarifications to aid comprehension. The first folio includes the title of the work, the author's full name—al-Imam al-'Alim al-Allama al-Hibr al-Muhaqqiq Burhan al-Din al-Hakim al-Sivasi—and invocations for blessings. Additional notes on this folio indicate that the manuscript was endowed by Ottoman Sultan Mahmud Khan and is part of the Haramayn Sharifayn endowments. Another commentary on the treatise in Ottoman Turkish is housed in the Şazeli Tekke section of the Süleymaniye Library. The commentary, written as a manuscript, can be found between folios 53 and 94 under inventory number 52. Each page of this commentary contains 17 lines.

Following the opening Bismillah, praise, and salutations, Burhan al-Din notes in the treatise's introduction that the writing of the work was inspired by the path of kashf (spiritual unveiling) followed by saints. He also emphasizes that the work adheres to the scholarly standards (ulama-i rusum) of his time. He asserts that he relied exclusively on the Qur’an and the Sunnah, distinguishing between essential truths and extraneous meanings in his discourse.

The treatise comprises three introductory sections. The first discusses wujud (existence), the second focuses on the "order of creation," and the third addresses the "wisdom of creation."

After these introductions, Burhan al-Din elaborates on the seven attributes of humans and identifies seven obligatory forms of worship: faith (iman), prayer (salat), fasting (sawm), pilgrimage (hajj), almsgiving (zakat), jihad, and sacrifice (qurban). He explains the higher purposes of these acts of worship and other religious observances, such as festivals, while delving into their external wisdom. He also draws connections between these practices and the manifestations of the Asma al-Husna (Beautiful Names of Allah).

Burhan al-Din's poetic Divan is preserved among Ottoman manuscripts in the British Museum. The only surviving copy of this work, produced during his lifetime, is adorned with miniatures. Dated to 1393, the Divan comprises over 20,000 verses and is divided into two unequal parts: the first contains 1,500 ghazals, while the second includes 20 rubaiyat and 119 tuyuqs—short mystical poems. According to Gibb, Burhan al-Din was the only poet among Western Turks to utilize the ancient poetic form tuyuq, which consists of four lines with the rhyme scheme a-a-b-a.

The sole surviving copy of the Divan was brought to London as part of the collection of Thomas Fiott Hughes, an employee of the British Embassy in Istanbul. It is currently housed in the British Museum (Or. nr. 4126). The manuscript, copied in 796 AH (1393–94) by Khalil ibn Ahmad, one of Burhan al-Din's calligraphers, is vowelized and written in a beautiful Seljuk naskh script. The text features gilded headers and framed pages. The Divan comprises ghazals (pp. 1–581), rubaiyat (pp. 582–585), and tuyuqs (pp. 586–608), containing over 1,300 ghazals, 20 rubaiyat, and 115 tuyuqs. The Divan is not arranged in classical order; rather, the poems appear in the sequence in which they were likely composed. Burhan al-Din did not use a pen name (takhallus) in his poetry.

The first scholarly study of the Divan was conducted in 1895 by Russian orientalist P. Melioranski, who translated 20 rubaiyat and 12 tuyuqs into Russian. F. F. Godsell later published four ghazals, along with all the rubaiyat and tuyuqs, in an article titled "Qazi Burhan al-Din: His Life and Work." A facsimile edition of the Divan was published with the support of the Turkish Language Association, and a critical edition was prepared by Mehmed Ergin (Istanbul, 1980). Ali Alparslan's Selections from Qazi Burhan al-Din's Divan includes a comprehensive analysis of the poet's work, along with 100 ghazals, seven rubaiyat, and 18 tuyuqs.

In 1988, Azerbaijani scholar Professor Alyar Safarli prepared and published the Divan in Baku. Subsequent editions included a brief biography of the poet written by Safarli.

Burhan al-Din's Divan exhibits unique characteristics that set it apart from later poetry collections. Unlike subsequent divans, which arranged ghazals alphabetically by the final letter of their rhyme, Burhan al-Din's work lacks such organization. Furthermore, his ghazals do not include a pen name or signature, which was customary in later periods. The prosody and thematic structure of his poems, although written in Turkish, bear the influence of Persian lyrical poetry traditions.

=== Languages ===
Sources provide varying accounts regarding the language of Burhan al-Din's works. Badr al-Din Ayni (1360–1451) states that Burhan al-Din's works were written in Arabic, Turkic, and Persian. Krymsky notes the same languages. Khadija Tören, in her article for the Encyclopedia of Islam, mentions that he wrote poems in Arabic, Persian, and Turkic. Claude Cahen offers a more distinct perspective on the matter.

==== Azerbaijani Turkish Version ====
Although most sources reiterate that Burhan al-Din wrote in Persian and Arabic, Russian sources present some variation. The main issue concerns which form of Turkic Burhan al-Din used. The Concise Literary Encyclopedia and the Great Russian Encyclopedia contain contradictions about the Turkic language of his works, particularly his divan. Turkish historian Fuad Köprülü, one of the first researchers on Burhan al-Din's works, argues that the characteristics of his divan align with Azerbaijani Turkish. Azerbaijani-origin Turkish linguist Ahmed Caferoğlu, in the Encyclopedia of Islam, highlights Burhan al-Din's and Nasimi's contributions to the development of Azerbaijani literature. Azerbaijani scholar Chingiz Huseynov, who wrote the article on Burhan al-Din in the Concise Literary Encyclopedia, states that Burhan al-Din wrote in Azerbaijani and Ottoman Turkish as well as Persian. Turkologist Beller-Hann posits that Burhan al-Din's works represent Middle Azerbaijani or an early stage of Iranian Turkish. Safarli, in his publication of Burhan al-Din's divan, emphasizes that the language of the works is Azerbaijani Turkish and that Burhan al-Din was a pioneer of literature in this language.

==== Old Anatolian Turkish with Azerbaijani Dialect ====
In the 14th century, the Anatolian Turkish language had two dialect zones: the western zone, including Konya, Eskişehir, Kırşehir, Sivrihisar, Bolu, Kütahya, and Aydın, and the eastern zone, covering Kastamonu, Çankırı, Sinop, Erzurum, Kayseri, Erzincan, and Sivas. Over time, these zones formed the basis of Azerbaijani and Ottoman Turkish, respectively.

Linguist Maharram Ergin, who published Burhan al-Din's divan, notes that Azerbaijani and Ottoman dialects had not yet distinctly formed during this period and that several centuries were still needed for this differentiation. He also observes that Burhan al-Din's divan displays features of the Azerbaijani dialect.

Turkish historian Ertaylan, who conducted one of the first academic studies on literature in Azerbaijani Turkish, writes that Burhan al-Din 's most important work, the Divan, was written in Azerbaijani Turkish. Koprulu, in his History of Turkish Literature, asserts that the Azerbaijani dialect is clearly evident in Burhan al-Din's works. Tören claims that the language of Burhan al-Din's works is Old Anatolian Turkish, yet in another article for the Turkish-Islamic Encyclopedia, she states that Burhan al-Din's poetic language belongs to the Azerbaijani region of Old Anatolian Turkish. Banarlı shares similar views. Historian Ismail Uzuncharshili asserts that Burhan al-Din's works were written in the Azerbaijani dialect. The author of the Encyclopedia of Islam's article on Burhan al-Din, C. Rypka, includes him among poets who used the Azerbaijani dialect.

==== Two Dialects ====
The first researcher of Burhan al-Din's poetry, Gibb, wrote:

His ghazals and rubai were written in a pure yet distinct western Turkish dialect. However, the tuyughs are rich in eastern Turkish words and grammatical forms not used elsewhere.

Turkish linguist H. Develi confirms that Burhan al-Din's Divan includes works written in both dialects of Old Anatolian Turkish. The western dialect was his native tongue, while he learned the eastern dialect during his time in Cairo, where the official and literary language was Mamluk Kipchak. Develi states that this language could be termed "generally eastern Turkic." Eastern dialectal features primarily appear in the tuyughs, where eastern and western Turkish elements coexist. According to Develi, Burhan al-Din occasionally used the musicality of the eastern dialect to enrich his style, though he was not fully proficient in it. Develi suggests that studying Nasimi and Fuzuli's texts is more appropriate for understanding the history of Azerbaijani language development than Burhan al-Din's.

==== Old Anatolian Turkish Version ====
Some authors argue that during Burhan al-Din's era, the "Anatolian Turks" had a unified language, and clear boundaries between the dialects of Old Anatolian Turkish were absent. Turkish linguist A. N. Kononov believed that although Burhan al-Din wrote in "Turkic related to Azerbaijani," there are no uniquely Azerbaijani characteristics in his divan's language because western Oghuz and Azerbaijani dialects had not yet diverged at that time.

Turkologist V. G. Guzev, in his monograph on Ottoman Turkish, also mentions that the Turks in Anatolia during this period shared a common language:

"The number of works in the language of Anatolian Turks increased significantly in the 14th and 15th centuries, including Burhan al-Din's Divan." Guzev explains that the term "Old Ottoman," often used for this language, is a misnomer and that "Old Anatolian Turkish" is more accurate. The language had two dialect zones—western and eastern. Guzev notes that eastern works display features resembling Azerbaijani Turkish. E. R. Tenishev, editor of the journal Soviet Turkology and the publication Comparative-Historical Grammar of Turkic Languages, classifies Burhan al-Din among poets who wrote in Seljuk (Old Anatolian Turkish, Old Ottoman) literary language. Turkish scholar Nuri Yüce, in his article on Ottoman Turkish, similarly argues that Burhan al-Din wrote in Old Ottoman (Old Anatolian) Turkish.

== Significance, Personality, and Evaluation ==
Burhan al-Din was highly regarded by his contemporaries and historians of later periods. Ibn Arabshah wrote about him:

This young man was highly talented, so devoted to learning that he even forsook sleep, and within a short time, mastered various sciences profoundly... He was a scholar, capable, noble, and a person who aspired to perfection, distinguished by precise and subtle expressions and words. Despite his great influence, he was close to the people and treated them kindly. He was very knowledgeable, a poet, sensitive, thoughtful, pleasant, determined, courageous, and valiant. He embodied the wisdom and virtue of the hereafter, fearlessly distributing it to thousands. He loved scholars, held assemblies with them, and was attentive to the welfare of the people.

The historian Stavrides described him as "one of the most remarkable figures of 14th-century Anatolia." Burhan al-Din, in addition to his position as a deputy, ruled for seventeen years. Sources portray him as a competent soldier, a courageous ruler, and a patron of scholars. After military campaigns, he took necessary measures to revive economic life, avoided imposing new taxes, and ensured the safety of roads. "Courage and bravery were intrinsic to his nature," wrote Ibn Hajar. However, he was not without flaws. Gibb characterized his personality as "ambitious and aggressive."

Daskopruzadeh and Sa'd al-Din described Burhan al-Din's work Tercîh as a highly esteemed text among the "ulema" of the time. Burhan al-Din was the first poet of Eastern Anatolia whose poetry has been preserved and can be definitively attributed to him. His Divan is the oldest collection of this kind. Burhan al-Din is recognized as a poet who made significant contributions to the development of Anatolian and Azerbaijani Turkish poetry and is considered one of the brightest representatives of 14th-century Turkish and Azerbaijani literature. Burhan al-Din also holds an important place in Azerbaijan's cultural history and is regarded, alongside Nasimi, as a significant figure in the development of Azerbaijani literature. Together with Nasimi, he is considered one of the founders of Azerbaijani aruz poetry. His Divan is of great importance for studying the historical lexicon, grammar, and dialectology of the southwestern group of Turkic languages, particularly Azerbaijani. The lexicon of the Divan shows no substantial differences from the modern Azerbaijani language, but it is notably distinct from the lexicon of other Turkic poets' divans.

According to Badr al-Din al-Ayni, Burhan al-Din composed "beautiful" poetry. Daskopruzadeh, apparently referencing Ibn Hajar, stated, "Mawlana Burhan al-Din was a master in composing poetry." Gibb described him as "a remarkable individual," noting that "even if not the first, he was among the earliest lyric poets of Western Turkey."

Despite being an eminent poet, some argue that Burhan al-Din did not achieve sufficient recognition and did not influence either Azerbaijani or Ottoman poetry. Joseph von Hammer-Purgstall, for instance, did not mention him in his work. However, historians such as Daskopruzadeh, Khoja Sa'd al-Din, and Katib Chelebi recorded that Qadi Burhan al-Din was a renowned poet. Nevertheless, Ottoman poets never referenced him, as he lived beyond the borders of the Ottoman Empire and was given little attention in Ottoman sources. Subsequently, P. Melioranski was the first to study Burhan al-Din’s Divan and published some of his poems in 1885 ("Fragments from the Divan of Ahmad Burhan al-Din of Sivas"). This was followed by E. Gibb in his work "The History of Ottoman Poetry" in 1909.

== Family ==
Burhān al-Dīn is reputed to have had 4 children: Muḥammad (died 1390), Zayn al-‘Abidin, Fulāna, and Ḥabība Seljūq Khātūn (died 1446). Zayn al-‘Abidin reigned for a few weeks after his father's demise. Burhān al-Dīn's daughters married Dulkadirid rulers. Fulāna married Nasir al-Dīn Mehmed Beg, and Ḥabība Seljūq Khātūn married Suleimān Beg:

- Spouse: The daughter of Eretnaoğlu Mehmed Bey. They married in 1364.
- Spouse: A woman from the ruling family of the Hacıemiroğulları. They married in 1386.
- Son: Alaeddin Ali (also known as Zeynal or Zeynalabidin). Ottoman historian Neşri records his death in 1442/1443.
- Son: Mehmed Çelebi. He died in Sivas in 1391 and was buried there.
- Son: Abbas. No additional information is available about him.
- Daughter: Habibe Seljuk Hatun. She died in 1446/1447 and was buried in Sivas. She was named after Burhan al-Din’s grandmother, who was a descendant of Sultan Kaykaus of the Anatolian Seljuks.
- Daughter: Though her name is unknown, it is recorded that she married Nasireddin Mehmed Bey of the Dulkadir.
- Daughter: Rabia. No further details about her life are available.

== Bibliography ==
- Кримський, Агатангел (1927), Бурганеддін Сіваський (бл. 1344-1397), кадий, владущий емір і поет-лірик, Т. 2, вип. 2. Письменство XIV-XVвв.
- Тильман, Н. (1997), Тимур-завоеватель и исламский мир позднего средневековья / Перевод с немецкого Ясинской Л.И. (PDF), Ростов-на-Дону: Феникс
- Rypka, J. (1986), Burhan al-Din, Leiden: E.J. Brill. Vol. I. - Encyclopaedia of Islam, New Edition, ISBN 90-04-09794-5
- Özaydın, Abdulkerim (2001), Kadı Burhâneddin, Islam Ansiklopedisi
- Usul, D. I. (2016), İlhanlı döneminde Uygurlar (doktora tezi) (PDF), SELÇUK ÜNİVERSİTESİ
- Aziz b. Erdeşir-i, çev. Mürsel Öztürk (1990), Bezm-u Rezm, Ankara: Kültür Bakanlığı
- Ибн Арабшах (2007), История амира Темура / пер. Х. Н. Бабабекова., Ташкент: Институт истории народов Средней Азии имени Махпират
- Gibb, E. J. W. (1900), A history of Otoman poetry, London: Luzac & Co., LTD
- İpşirli, M. (1992), Beylerbeyi, Islam Ansiklopedisi
- Шильтбергер, ИОАНН (1984), Путешествие Ивана Шильтбергера по Европе, Азии и Африке, с 1394 года по 1427 год, АН АзССР, Институт Востоковедения, перевод Ф. К. Бруна - Элм
- Калимуллиной, пер. Л. Калимуллиной (2010), Письмо Тамерлана Баязиду I // Восточно-европейская политика Тимура, Институт истории им. Ш. Марджани АН РТ. Т. 3.
- Zachariadou, E. A (1980), I. Bayezid ve Kadı Burhaneddin Arasındaki Çekişmede II. Manuel Palaiologos (Manuel II Palaeologos on the strife between Bayezid I and Kadi Burhan al-Din Ahmed) (PDF), London: Bulletin of the School of Oriental and African Studies, University of London. Vol. 43.
- Parry, V.J. (1986), Bayezid I, Leiden: E.J. Brill - Encyclopaedia of Islam, New Edition, ISBN 90-04-09794-5
- Keçiş, M. (2013), Manuel Palaiologos'un Mektuplarında Sultan Yıldırım Bayezid ve Osmanlılar (PDF), Las Vegas: The Journal of Academic Social Science Studies - Macrothink Institute
- Taeschner, Fr (1986), AMASYA, Leiden: E.J. Brill. Vol. I. - Encyclopaedia of Islam, New Edition, ISBN 90-04-09794-5
- Səfərli, Əlyar (2005), Qazi Bürhanəddin. Divan (PDF), Baku: Öndər
- Еремеев, Д. Е.; Мейер, М. С. (1992). История Турции в средние века и новое время. Изд-во МГУ. ISBN 978-1-108-35530-8.
- Cahen, Claude (1968). Pre-Ottoman Turkey: A general survey of the material and spiritual culture and history, c. 1071–1330. New York: Taplinger. pp. 362–363.
- Heß, Michael R. (19 July 2021). "Kadı Burhaneddin". In Fleet, Kate; Krämer, Gudrun; Matringe, Denis; Nawas, John; Rowson, Everett (eds.). Encyclopaedia of Islam (3rd ed.). Brill Online. doi:10.1163/1573-3912_ei3_COM_24579. ISSN 1873-9830.
- Javadi, H.; Burrill, K. (1988). "Azerbaijan x. Azeri Turkish Literature". Encyclopædia Iranica, Vol. III, Fasc. 3. pp. 251–255.
- Mustafayev, Shahin (2013). "Ethnolinguistic Processes in the Turkic Milieu of Anatolia and Azerbaijan (14th–15th Centuries)". In Lascu, Stoica; Fetisleam, Melek (eds.). Contemporary Research in Turkology and Eurasian Studies: A Festschrift in Honor of Professor Tasin Gemil on the Occasion of His 70th Birthday. Cluj-Napoca: Cluj University Press. pp. 333–346. ISBN 978-973-595-622-6.
- Rypka, Jan (1960). "Burhān al-Dīn". In Gibb, H. A. R.; Kramers, J. H.; Lévi-Provençal, E.; Schacht, J.; Lewis, B. & Pellat, Ch. (eds.). The Encyclopaedia of Islam, Second Edition. Volume I: A–B. Leiden: E. J. Brill. pp. 1327–1328. OCLC 495469456.
- Uzunçarşılı, İsmail Hakkı (20 April 1968). "Sivas - Kayseri ve Dolaylarında Eretna Devleti" [State of Eretna in Sivas - Kayseri and Around]. Belleten (in Turkish). 32 (126). Turkish Historical Association: 161–190.
- von Zambaur, Eduard Karl Max (1927). Manuel de généalogie et de chronologie pour l'histoire de l'Islam avec 20 tableaux généalogiques hors texte et 5 cartes [Handbook of genealogy and chronology for the history of Islam: with 20 additional genealogical tables and 5 maps] (in French). H. Lafaire.
- Zacharidou, Elizabeth A. (1980). "Manuel II Palaeologos on the Strife between Bāyezīd I and Ḳāḍī Burhān al-Dīn Aḥmad". Bulletin of the School of Oriental and African Studies, University of London. 43 (3): 471–481. doi:10.1017/S0041977X00137395. JSTOR 615736.
- Uzuncarsili, I. H. (1969), Anadolu Beylikleri ve Akkoyunlu, Karakoyunlu Devletleri, Ankara: Türk Tarih Kurumu
- Babayev, Yaqub (2018), Azərbaycan Ədəbiyyatı Tarixi (XIII-XVIII əsrlər), Bakı: Elm və təhsil
- Köprülü, Fuat (1924), Fuzuli: Hayatı ve Eseri, İstanbul: Yeni Şark Kütüphanesi
- Köprülü, Fuat (1926), Turkish Poetry from Its Origins to the Tenth Hijri Century, İstanbul
- Dinç, Emine Nurefşan (2009), KADI BURHÂNEDDİN'İN TERCÎHU't-TAVZÎH İSİMLİ ESERİNİN TAHKÎKİ VE DEĞERLENDİRİLMESİ, İstanbul: T.C MARMARA ÜNİVERSİTESİ SOSYAL BİLİMLER ENSTİTÜSÜ İLAHİYAT ANABİLİM DALI İSLAM HUKUKU BİLİM DALI
- Karataş, Nizamettin (2014), Kadı Burhâneddin'in İksîru's-Seâdât fî Esrâri'l- İbâdât adlı eserinin tahkiki ve İslam Hukuku açısından tahlili, Sivas: Cumhuriyet Üniversitesi
- British Library, Turkish and Turkic manuscripts.
- КЛЭ, Краткая литературная энциклопедия (1962), Бурханеддин, Moskva: Под ред. А. А. Суркова. — Советская энциклопедия. Т. 1.
- Tören, Hatice (2001), Kadı Burhâneddin (Edebi ve Tasavvufi Şahsiyeti), Islam Ansiklopedisi
- Гузев, В. Г. (1979), Староосманский язык, Moskva: Наука
- Develi, Hayati (2004), Kadı Burhaneddin'in Dili Azerbaycan Türkçesi midir?, Kırşehir: Kırşehir Kültür Araştırmaları Bilgi Şöleni
- Caferoglu, Ahmet (1986), Adhari (Azeri), Leiden: E.J. Brill - Vol. I / ed. by H. A. R. Gibb, J. H. Kramers, E. Lévi-Provençal, J. Schacht, B. Lewis, Ch. Pellat. Assisted by S. M. Stern, C. Dumont and R. M. Savory. - Encyclopaedia of Islam, New Edition, ISBN 90-04-09794-5
- Beller-Hann, I. (1992), The Oghuz split: the emergence of Turc Ajämi as a written idiom, Materialia Turcica, ISSN 2630-5909
- Гусейнов, Ч. Г. (2006), "Бурханеддин", Большая российская энциклопедия. Том 4: Большой Кавказ — Великий канал, Moscow: Большая российская энциклопедия, ISBN 5-85270-333-8, archived from the original on 22 June 2025
- Гузев, В. Г. (1997), Староанатолийско-тюркский язык // Тюркские языки, Бишкек: ред. Тенишев Э.Р.. Изд. Дом "Кыргыстан". Т. 2., ISBN 978-5-655-01214-1
- Tören, Hatice (2000), "Kadı Burhaneddin Divanında Bazı Yeni Okuyuşlar", İlmî Araştırmalar: Dil, Edebiyat, Tarih İncelemeleri, no. 9, İstanbul: İlmî Araştırmalar : Dil, Edebiyat, Tarih İncelemeleri. Fatih Sultan Mehmet Vakıf Üniversitesi, ISSN 1304-9828
- Ergin, Muharrem (1980), Kadı Burhaneddin Divanı, İstanbul: Edebiyat fakültesi matbaası
- Banarlı, Nihad Sami (1983), Resimli Türk Edebiyatı Tarihi, İstanbul: Panorama Kitap
- Кононов, А. Н. (1977), Основные этапы формирования турецкого письменного литературного языка (PDF), Вопросы языкознания. Т. 4.
- Тенишев, Э. Р. (1997), Тюркоязычных письменных памятников языки // Тюркские языки / Э. Р. Тенишев (ответственный редактор), Moskva: Институт языкознания РАН, ISBN 5-655-01214-6
- Ихсаноглу, Юдже Нури (2006), Османо-турецкий язык // История османской цивилизации / Ихсаноглу Э. (ред.), Moskva: Восточная литература. (История Османского государства, общества и цивилизации. В 2-х тт)
- Stavrides, T. (2001), The Sultan of vezirs: the life and times of the Ottoman Grand Vezir Mahmud Pasha Angelović (1453—1474), Leiden; Boston: BRILL, ISBN 9004121064
- Асланов, В. И. (1976), Из наблюдений над лексикой "Дивана" Кады Бурханеддина / Туркологика. Андрей Николаевич Кононов, Юрий Ашотович Петросян, Академия наук СССР. Отделение литературы и языка, Институт востоковедения., Leninqrad: Наука
- Акрем, Джафар (1973), Метрика поэзии Насими // Имадеддин Насими: сборник статей, Баку: Элм
- Emecen, F. (2009). "Anatolian emirates". Encyclopedia of the Ottoman Empire (PDF). New York: Facts on File. pp. 40–42. ISBN 978-0-8160-6259-1.
- Chittick, William C. (1981). "Sultan Burhān al-Dīn Sufi Correspondence". Wiener Zeitschrift für die Kunde des Morgenlandes. 73: 33–45. JSTOR 23871262.
