= Akhiya =

Community groups in the Ottoman Empire

Akhiya or Akhi brotherhoods (from the Arabic اخي, “my brother”) were the Sufi guilds of young men dedicated to the betterment of the community focused around Anatolia, in the lands that would become the Ottoman Empire. Present beginning around the time of the Seljuk breaking of the Sultanate of Rum in the thirteenth century, these organizations would provide an organizational force in what were largely loosely hinterlands. Akhiya (or Young Brotherhood) were a crucial part of the urban development and infrastructure of early Ottoman history. The brotherhoods were formed out of the medieval Islamic futuwwa organizations. The purpose of each brotherhood was to provide an infrastructure for production and trade in the town in which it was set up and provide a social framework for the men of town.

== Etymology ==
The term akhi, derived from the Arabic word for brother, carries a particular religious connotation derived from the Quran, which instructs “the believers are but brothers.” Specifically, the brother was the leader of the organization, as chosen by his fellow members, who were known as fityan (youths). Ibn Battuta, in his travels through Anatolia, identifies the Akhiya and Futuwwa (Order of Youth, Chivalry) as interchangeable terms, both of which described the same work being done.

== Organization ==
Akhi groups in what would become Ottoman lands were centred around a lodge or hospice, where the members of the group would reside and partake in communal living and rituals. These rituals would have a distinctly religious element, with the Sufi traditions that distinguished Anatolia from much of the orthodox Sunni world at the time in full presence as the power of the Sultanate of Rum receded. The hospice would also serve as a guesthouse for travellers, with hospitality being perhaps the most important virtue to the members.

It would be nearly impossible to overstate the extent of the influence these lodges had on the region during the Beylikate Period in Anatolia. Ibn Battuta observed during his travels in the region that “in every district, town, and village, there are to be found members of the organization". G.G. Arnakis identifies the organizations as being at least partially responsible for the relative peace that broke out after the Seljuk conquest. In areas where imperial power, be it of the Ottomans, other beyliks, or the Seljuks, barely radiated beyond the court, these groups provided stability and organization to towns that would otherwise be unimaginable. As apt to kill off corrupt and tyrannical police as they were to debate captured Christian archbishops, the Akhiya served to protect their communities and faith at a time when the boundaries between principalities were loose at best.

As the Ottomans under Orhan began to consolidate power, they began to absorb many of the functions of the brotherhoods, leaving them intact while the empire remained nascent. The brotherhoods would form the core of Ottoman communities, afforded an elite status and respect by the imperial court in exchange for their irreplaceable position in the social fabric. While later Sultans would seek to crush the political power of the Akhiya, their communal influence would remain for essentially the entire length of the Ottoman Period, taking on a role identified by some observers as resembling European Freemasonry, with a focus turning to social bonds and cooperation between workers.

The brotherhoods were led by a Young Brother or Akhi who was chosen by all the other men of the brotherhood to be the leader. This man was typically unmarried, but could also be a married man or even a city elite. In some cases, the Akhi could even be someone who already held a high government position himself. The Akhi was responsible for building and furnishing the city hospice. He was also the one to entertain guests when they visited and stayed at the hospice. The members of the brotherhood were called Fityán (youths) and would work during the day and bring their money back to the Akhi once they had finished in the afternoon. This money was then used to further stock the hospice with food and other necessities. If there were no travelers, the members would eat in the evening and then repeat the same process the next day. However, if there was a traveler in town, he would be housed at the hospice and the food bought would go to him every day until he left to continue his travels.

The brotherhoods were set up in newly conquered Ottoman towns and could be found throughout Anatolia in every town and village. In some cases, such as in Bursa, the brotherhood could fully set up within a town in around five years. but it took time to develop influence amongst the people and recruit members. Even in situations where the city that had been conquered was not previously Muslim, the Akhi Brotherhoods were still able to gain influence, Bursa once again being an example of this. The brotherhoods supported the working class, but also many Akhi’s had the influence of elites.

== Disposition and beliefs ==
The men of the brotherhood were generally very well-mannered and generous as they ascribed to the ideas of chivalry and virtue put forth in the Futuuwa. Ibn Battuta described them as “men so eager to welcome strangers, so prompt to serve food and to satisfy the wants of others, and so ready to suppress injustice and kill tyrannical agents of police and the miscreants who join with them.” Many of the brotherhoods formed their fellowship through documents similar to a “futuwwatnames” which preached virtues like modesty, self-control and denial.

== Influence ==
The brotherhoods had an important role in the formation of early Ottoman society and in the creation of the janissaries. During times of transition in the central government, the Akhi would take control of their city and try to avoid too much damage as the power transitioned to the next regime. They would also control much of the trade and production in the town, thus having a solid control on the economic regulation. They were essentially the Ottomans “clean up force” as they would move into a town and settle it. They held such tremendous power in some places that local Christian guilds were often forced to merge with the brotherhoods for their own livelihoods. This allowed the brotherhoods to quickly take control of the urban areas.

== Dissolution ==
Eventually, the Akhi Brotherhoods became trade guilds and lost their autonomy as they became elements of the central state. As trade became more international or at least under a larger scope, the brotherhoods were no longer able to control the economy of a particular town or region. The system worked till roughly the end of the 16th century.

== Other usage ==
In the United Kingdom Akhi is slang for “brother” or “my brother” being a loanword from Arabic. The word has also been adopted by rap and drill artists in the London music scene.

== See also ==
- Ahis
