= Timeline of the Khitans =

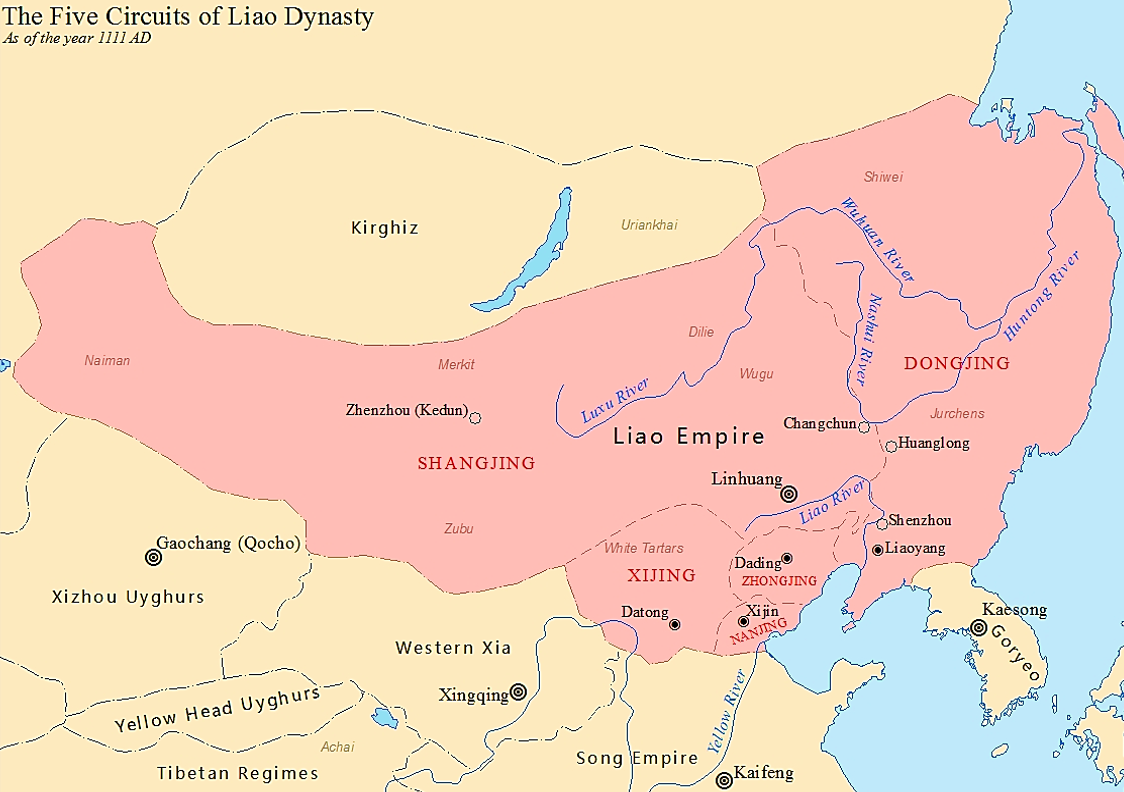
Liao dynasty (916–1125)

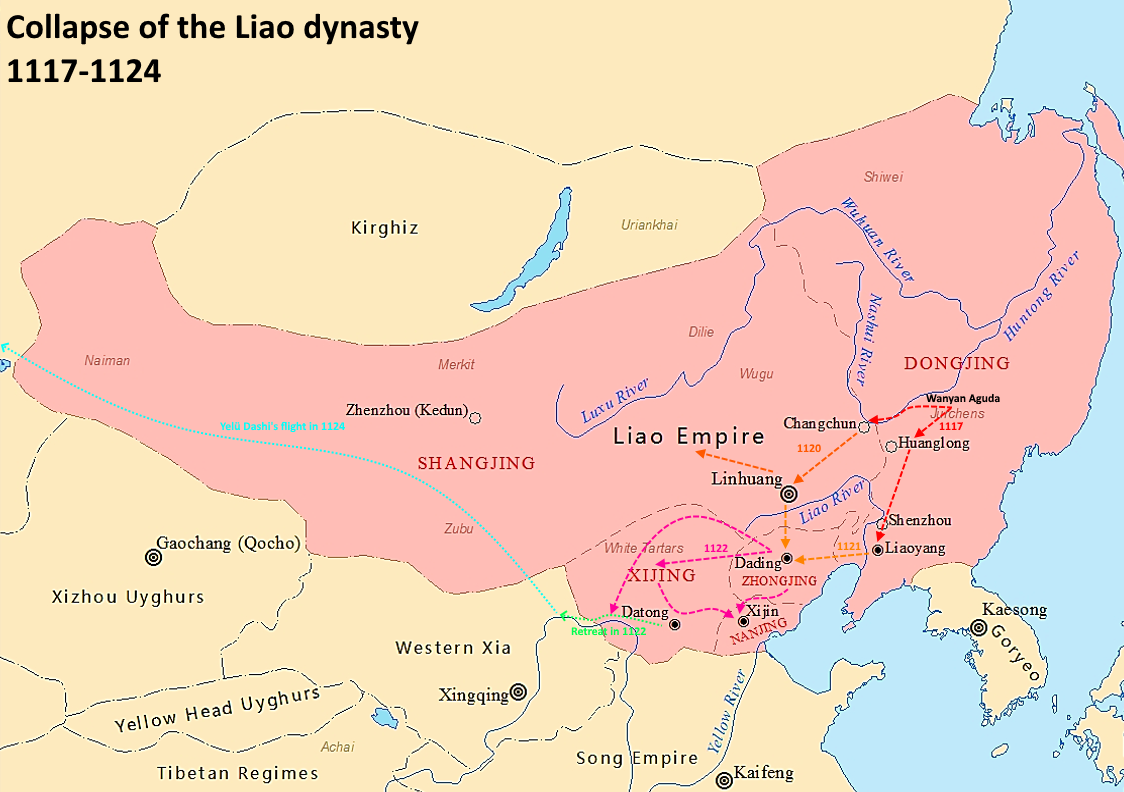
Collapse of the Liao dynasty (1117–1124)

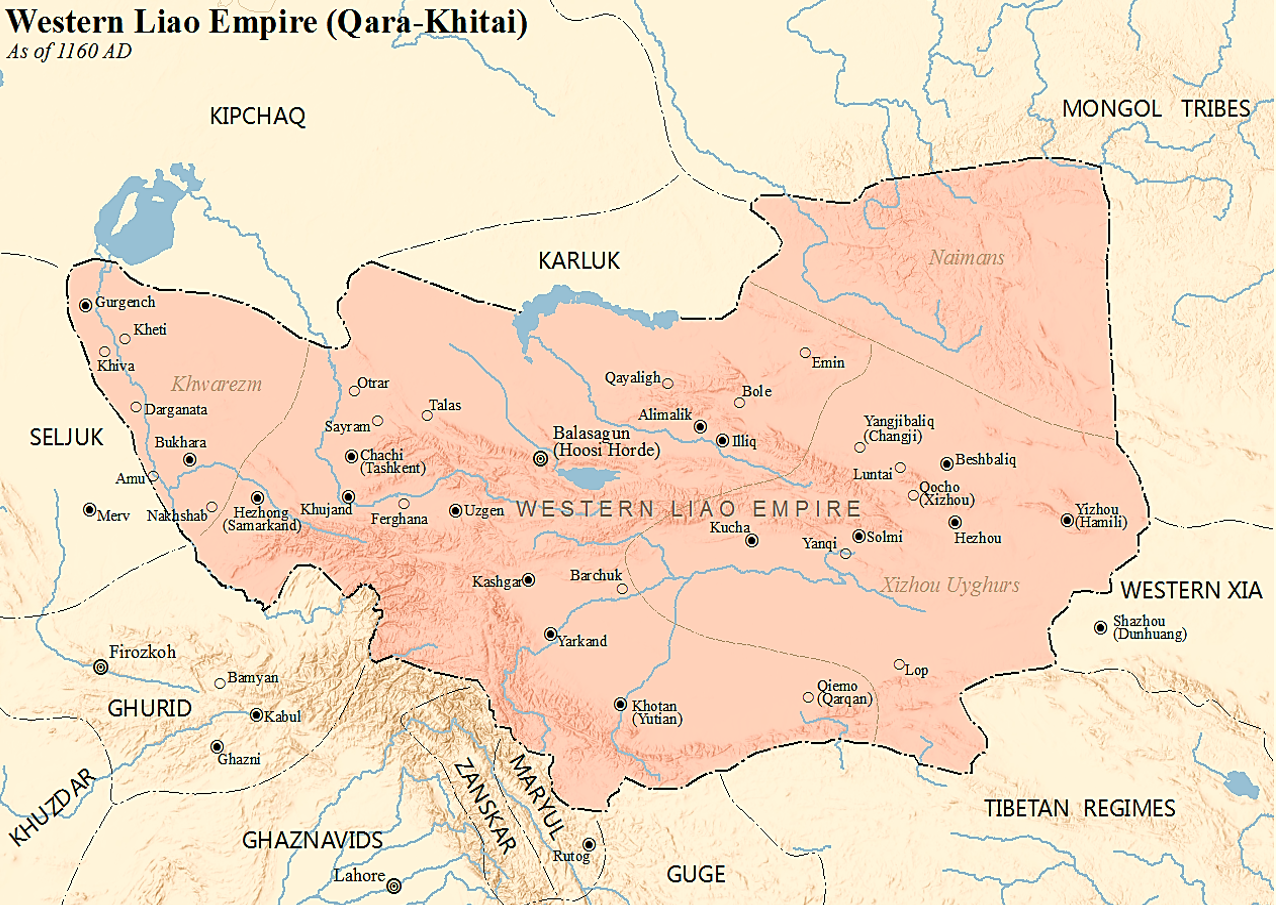
Western Liao (Qara Khitai) (1124–1218)

This is a timeline of the history of the Khitans. The Khitans were a nomadic people in Northeast Asia related to the Xianbei. Following the collapse of the Tang dynasty, they established the Liao dynasty in 916, encompassing parts of modern-day China, Mongolia, North Korea, and Russia. The Liao dynasty was eventually conquered by the Jin dynasty in 1125. Remnants of the Liao court led by Yelü Dashi fled westward to Central Asia where they established the Western Liao dynasty. In 1211, the Western Liao throne was usurped by a Naiman called Kuchlug. In 1218, the Mongol Empire defeated and conquered the Western Liao dynasty.

== 4th century ==
Year	Date	Event
388		The Kumo Xi are defeated by the Northern Wei. As a result, the Khitans split from the Kumo Xi and emerge as a recognizable group of people around the Songmo region in modern Heshigten Banner and Ongniud Banner; at some point they migrate to the east of Daling River in modern Beipiao, Fuxin, and Zhangwu County

== 6th century ==
Year	Date	Event
553		Khitans raid Northern Qi, who retaliate dealing devastating losses to the Khitans
585		Khitans move to the area between the Laoha River and Liao River

== 7th century ==
Year	Date	Event
605		Yami Qaghan of the Eastern Turkic Khaganate attacks the Khitans on behalf of the Sui dynasty
618		Dahe Duoluo comes to power
619		Khitans led by Sun Aocao, great-grandfather of Sun Wanrong, submit to the Tang dynasty
627		Dahe Mohui succeeds Dahe Duoluo
628		Khitans led by Dahe Mohui submit to the Tang dynasty as vassals
644		Dahe Kuge succeeds Dahe Mohui
648		Khitans submit to the Tang dynasty as vassals
653		Abugu succeeds Dahe Kuge
654		Mohe and Goguryeo attack the Khitans
660		Tang dynasty attacks the Khitans and captures their leader Abugu at Songmo; Abugu is sent to Luoyang;
675		Dahe Jinzhong comes to power
696		Li Jinzhong (Mushang Khan) of the Khitans along with his brother-in-law Sun Wanrong revolt against Tang hegemony and attack Hebei; Li dies soon after and Sun succeeds him
697		Tang dynasty and Qapaghan Qaghan of the Second Turkic Khaganate defeat Sun Wanrong and Khitans become vassals of the Turks; Dahe Shihuo succeeds Sun Wanrong

== 8th century ==
Year	Date	Event
716		Khitans break alliance with the Turks and ally with Tang
717		Dahe Suogu succeeds Dahe Shihuo
720		Ketuyu attacks Suogu and Suogu flees to the governor-general of Ying Prefecture, who sends 500 Tang soldiers to back Suogu but is defeated
720		Dahe Yugan succeeds Dahe Suogu
724		Dahe Tugan succeeds Dahe Yugan
725		Dahe Shaogu succeeds Dahe Tugan, who fled to the Tang dynasty in fear of Ketuyu
730		Ketuyu of the Khitans attacks Tang
730		Julü succeeds Dahe Shaogu
732		Tang forces inflict heavy casualties on the Khitans and Kumo Xi
733		A Tang-Kumo Xi army attacks a Turk-Khitan army
734		Zhang Shougui defeats Khitan forces in Youzhou (Hebei)
735		Guozhe murders Ketuyu and succeeds Julü
736		An Lushan attacks the Khitans but is defeated
740		An Lushan attacks the Khitans
745		Two Khitan tribes revolt and are defeated by An Lushan
746		Kailuo succeeds Guozhe
750		Chinese cultural dominance in Liaoning disappears and is replaced by Khitan culture
752		An Lushan attacks the Khitans
778		Su Khagan succeeds Kailuo
795		60,000 Kumo Xi raid the Tang dynasty and are defeated by Liu Ji

== 9th century ==
Year	Date	Event
800		Bala Khagan succeeds Su Khagan
820		Zhaogu Khagan succeeds Bala Khagan
830		Kumo Xi raid Youzhou and are defeated by Li Zaiyi
842		Qushu succeeds Zhaogu Khagan
847		The Kumo Xi rebel against the Tang dynasty and are defeated by Zhang Zhongwu
860		Xi'er succeeds Qushu
882		Qinde succeeds Xi'er
890		The Khitans drive the Kyrgyz away from the Orkhon Valley

== 10th century ==
=== 900s ===
Year	Date	Event
901		Abaoji is elected leader of the Yila tribe
903		Abaoji becomes Yuyue, commander of all the Khitan nation's military forces
905		Abaoji secures an alliance with Li Keyong in Datong
907	27 February	Khitan chieftain Abaoji becomes khagan of the Khitans
908		Abaoji attacks the Shiwei

=== 910s ===
Year	Date	Event
910		Abaoji subdues a rebellion by the Kumo Xi
912		Abaoji attacks the Zubu
915		Abaoji attacks the Khongirad
916		Abaoji declares himself emperor of the Khitans and force Goryeo and Silla to pay tribute
917		Wuyue offers the Khitans naphtha but they refuse
918		Khitans relocate their capital to Shangjing, the Supreme Capital
919		Khitans subdue the Khongirad

=== 920s ===
Year	Date	Event
922		Abaoji raids Jin
923		Abaoji raids Later Tang
924		Abaoji conquers the Tartars
926		Khitans conquer Balhae and set up the puppet kingdom of Dongdan
926	6 September	Abaoji dies and his son Yelü Bei withdraws his claim to the throne, and the second son Yelü Deguang becomes Emperor Taizong of Liao
928		Khongirad rebels in the north
929		Emperor Taizong of Liao orders the relocation of the Dongdan Kingdom and its people to the Eastern Capital in modern Liaoyang

=== 930s ===
Year	Date	Event
930		Yelü Bei flees to Later Tang
933		Khitans attack the Tanguts
936	28 November	Khitans install Shi Jingtang as emperor of the Later Jin. In return Shi transfers 16 prefectures in Shanxi and Hebei to the Liao.
937		Shi Jingtang of the Later Jin kills Yelü Bei

=== 940s ===
Year	Date	Event
947		The Khitan state is named the Liao dynasty
947		Liao dynasty invades Later Jin and sacks Xiang Prefecture, killing most of its population
947	15 May	Emperor Taizong of Liao dies and the son of Yelü Bei, Yelü Ruan, succeeds him as Emperor Shizong of Liao

=== 950s ===
Year	Date	Event
951	7 October	Emperor Shizong of Liao is murdered by a relative and is succeeded by Yelü Jing, son of Emperor Taizong of Liao, who becomes Emperor Muzong of Liao
952		Liao dynasty assists Northern Han in repelling Later Zhou
954		Liao dynasty assists Northern Han in repelling Later Zhou
959		Later Zhou invades the Liao dynasty but retreats after their emperor dies

=== 960s ===
Year	Date	Event
960	February	Zhao Kuangyin declares himself Emperor Taizu of Song, replacing Later Zhou
963		Minor skirmishes occur along the Liao dynasty and Song dynasty borders
964		Liao dynasty assists Northern Han in repelling Song dynasty
965		Khongirad and Shiwei tribes rebel
967		Minor skirmishes occur along the Liao dynasty and Song dynasty border
969	12 March	Emperor Muzong of Liao is murdered by his attendants and is succeeded by Yelü Xian, son of Emperor Shizong of Liao, who becomes Emperor Jingzong of Liao

=== 970s ===
Year	Date	Event
973		Jurchens raid Liao dynasty
975		Liao dynasty attacks Jeongan but fails
976		Liao dynasty assists Northern Han in repelling Song dynasty
976		Jurchens raid Liao dynasty
977		Liao dynasty assists Northern Han in repelling Song dynasty
977		An examination hall is built in Southern Capital
979		Liao dynasty attempts to assist Northern Han in repelling Song dynasty but is intercepted en route and demolished
979		Battle of Gaoliang River: Song dynasty invades Liao dynasty and is defeated

=== 980s ===
Year	Date	Event
980		Emperor Jingzong of Liao invades the Song dynasty and retakes territory in Hebei
982		Emperor Jingzong of Liao invades the Song dynasty but is defeated
982	13 October	Emperor Jingzong of Liao dies and his son Yelü Longxu succeeds him as Emperor Shengzong of Liao; Empress Xiao Yanyan becomes regent
983		The Liao dynasty reverts to calling itself the Khitans
986		Song dynasty attacks the Khitans but is defeated
988		Khitans begin holding regular imperial examinations

=== 990s ===
Year	Date	Event
992		Khitans attack the Tanguts
993		First conflict in the Goryeo–Khitan War: Khitans invade Goryeo and acquire nominal tributary status over Goryeo
997		Zubu tribes rebel
998		Khitans invade the Song dynasty

== 11th century ==
=== 1000s ===
Year	Date	Event
1000		Khitan forces retreat from the Song dynasty after failing to take key cities
1001		Khitans attack the Song dynasty but are repulsed
1003		Khitans invade the Song dynasty and retreat without making permanent gains
1004		Emperor Shengzong of Liao conducts a full-scale invasion of the Song dynasty which ends in stalemate and the Chanyuan Treaty, an agreement to an annual payment of silk and silver from the Song to the Khitans
1006		The Kumo Xi are assimilated into the Khitan nation
1007		Zubu tribes rebel
1009		Empress Xiao Yanyan dies

=== 1010s ===
Year	Date	Event
1010		Second conflict in the Goryeo–Khitan War: Mokjong of Goryeo is murdered by Kang Cho and the Khitans send an expedition to punish him; Kang Cho is killed
1012		Zubu tribes rebel
1018		Third conflict in the Goryeo–Khitan War: Khitans invade Goryeo but are defeated
1019		Third conflict in the Goryeo–Khitan War: Khitans prepares another army to attack Goryeo

=== 1020s ===
Year	Date	Event
1020		Hyeonjong of Goryeo sends envoys to pay tribute to the Khitans
1027		Khitans attack the Ganzhou Uyghur Kingdom but are repelled and then ambushed by Zubu tribes
1029		Da Yanlin, a distant relative of the defunct Balhae regime, rebels; he is defeated

=== 1030s ===
Year	Date	Event
1031	25 June	Emperor Shengzong of Liao dies and his son Yelü Zongzhen succeeds him as Emperor Xingzong of Liao; Xiao Noujin becomes regent
1034		Xiao Noujin attempts to dethrone Emperor Xingzong of Liao but fails and is banished
1038	10 November	Li Yuanhao declares himself Emperor Jingzong of Western Xia
1039		Xiao Noujin returns to the capital

=== 1040s ===
Year	Date	Event
1042		Khitans force the Song dynasty to increase annual tribute to 200,000 taels of silver and 300,000 bolts of silk
1044		Khitans attack the Western Xia but fail
1049		Khitans attack Western Xia but are repelled

=== 1050s ===
Year	Date	Event
1050		Khitans attack Western Xia and extract tribute
1055	28 August	Emperor Xingzong of Liao dies and is succeeded by his son Yelü Hongji, who becomes Emperor Daozong of Liao
1055		All officials are required to wear Chinese court dress
1056		The Pagoda of Fogong Temple is completed
1059		Institutes of higher learning are established in the capitals and prefectural and county schools are established

=== 1060s ===
Year	Date	Event
1063		A group of Khitan dissidents ambush Emperor Daozong of Liao but are defeated
1066		Khitans revert to calling their state the Liao dynasty
1069		Zubu tribes rebel

=== 1070s ===
Year	Date	Event
1076		Trade of gunpowder ingredients with the Liao dynasty and Western Xia is outlawed by the Song dynasty
1082		Unusually heavy snowfall kills 70 percent of livestock and horses

=== 1080s ===
Year	Date	Event
1085		The Shilu, the Veritable Records, are produced

=== 1090s ===
Year	Date	Event
1093		Mogusi of the Zubu and the Dilie tribes of western Heilongjiang raid the Liao dynasty

== 12th century ==
=== 1100s ===
Year	Date	Event
1100		Mogusi of the Zubu is captured and hacked to pieces at the capital
1100		The Tianning Temple (Beijing) is completed
1101	12 February	Emperor Daozong of Liao dies and his grandson Yelü Yanxi succeeds him as Emperor Tianzuo of Liao
1102		The Zubu and Dilie tribes are pacified

=== 1110s ===
Year	Date	Event
1114		The Jurchens under Wanyan Aguda attack the Liao dynasty
1115		Wanyan Aguda declares himself emperor of the Jin dynasty
1115		Yelü Zhangnu rebels and is defeated
1116		Gao Yongchang rebels in the east and asks the Jurchens for help and ends up getting annexed by the Jin dynasty
1117		Emperor Taizu of Jin defeats the Khitan army of the Liao dynasty
1118		Zubu tribes rebel against the Liao dynasty and Liao territory suffers from famine
1118		Emperor Taizu of Jin captures the Liao dynasty's Eastern Capital

=== 1120s ===
Year	Date	Event
1120		Emperor Taizu of Jin captures the Liao dynasty's Supreme Capital
1121		Emperor Taizu of Jin captures the Liao dynasty's Central Capital
1122		Emperor Tianzuo of Liao flees the Southern Capital and his uncle Yelü Chun is declared emperor of Northern Liao, however he dies three months later and the title is passed down to Yelü Ding, the son in hiding with his father the emperor also in hiding; real power goes to Empress Dowager Xiao Defei
1122		Jin dynasty conquers the Western Capital and Southern Capital
1122		Yelü Dashi and Empress Dowager Xiao Defei retreat to the west and meet up with Emperor Tianzuo of Liao, who executes the empress for disloyalty
1123		Song dynasty attacks the Liao dynasty but is repelled
1123		Yelü Dashi is captured by the Jin dynasty and leads an attack on Emperor Tianzuo of Liao, who escapes; afterwards Yelü Dashi escapes from the Jurchens and rejoins the emperor
1124		Emperor Tianzuo of Liao attacks the Jin dynasty despite warnings from Yelü Dashi
1124		Yelü Dashi declares himself king and flees with 200 followers to the Orkhon River, where he eventually takes the title of gurkhan, meaning "Universal Khan"
1125	26 March	Emperor Tianzuo of Liao is captured by the Jin dynasty; so ends the Liao dynasty
1128		Emperor Tianzuo of Liao dies in captivity
1129		Yelü Dashi annexes two Jin tribes

=== 1130s ===
Year	Date	Event
1130		Yelü Dashi leaves the Orkhon River with 20,000 followers and travels to the Kingdom of Qocho where the ruler welcomes him
1131	summer	Yelü Dashi attacks the Karakhanids at Kashgar but is repelled
1134		Yelü Dashi captures Balasagun and vassalizes the nearby Kankalis, Karluks, Kyrgyz, and Kingdom of Qocho
1134		Yelü Dashi launches an invasion of the Jin dynasty, which ends in failure
1137		Yelü Dashi defeats Mahmud of the Western Karakhanids near Khujand and annexes Fergana and Tashkent
1137		Khitans raid Jin dynasty

=== 1140s ===
Year	Date	Event
1141	9 September	Battle of Qatwan: Yelü Dashi annihilates the army of Ahmad Sanjar of the Seljuk Empire and vassalizes the Khwarazmian dynasty
1142		Qara Khitai plunders Khwarezm and forces Atsiz to pay an annual tribute of 30,000 dinars
1143		Yelü Dashi dies and his wife Xiao Tabuyan succeeds him as regent

=== 1150s ===
Year	Date	Event
1151		Yelü Yilie, son of Yelü Dashi, becomes gurkhan of the Qara Khitai

=== 1160s ===
Year	Date	Event
1161		Khitans rebel against the Jin dynasty
1163		The Khitan rebellion is defeated by the Jin dynasty
1163		Yelü Yilie dies and is succeeded by his sister, Yelü Pusuwan
1165		Qara Khitai conquers Balkh

=== 1170s ===
Year	Date	Event
1171		Qara Khitai defeats a Khwarazmian army
1172		Qara Khitai assists Ala ad-Din Tekish in taking the Khwarazmian dynasty from his brother Sultan Shah of Khwarezm
1175		Naimans and Kankalis switch sides to the Jin dynasty
1177		Yelü Pusuwan is discovered in an affair with Xiao Fuguzhi and gets executed; Yelü Yilie's son Yelü Zhilugu becomes gurkhan of the Qara Khitai

=== 1180s ===
Year	Date	Event
1181		Qara Khitai assists Sultan Shah of Khwarezm in taking Merv, Sarakhs, and Abiward
1181		Kipchaks raid the Qara Khitai

=== 1190s ===
Year	Date	Event
1198		Qara Khitai assists Ala ad-Din Tekish against the Ghurids but is defeated and loses Balkh

== 13th century ==
=== 1200s ===
Year	Date	Event
1204		Qara Khitai defeats Muhammad of Ghor
1204		Kashgar and Khotan rebel unsuccessfully against the Qara Khitai
1205		Ghurids seize Termez from the Qara Khitai
1206		Qara Khitai retakes Termez
1206	spring	Kokochu, also known as Teb Tengri, chief shaman of the Mongols, bestows upon Temüjin the title of Genghis Khan, "Oceanic Ruler" of the Mongol Empire, at the kurultai of Burkhan Khaldun, sacred mountain of the Mongols
1207		Muhammad II of Khwarezm captures Bukhara and Samarkand
1208		Kuchlug of the Naimans arrives at the Qara Khitai court
1209		Kingdom of Qocho rebels against Qara Khitai and switches allegiance to the Mongol Empire of Genghis Khan
1209		Qara Khitai captures Samarkand

=== 1210s ===
Year	Date	Event
1210		Kuchlug sacks Uzgen
1210	August	A Qara Khitai army is defeated by Muhammad II of Khwarezm, who captures the Khitan commander Tayangu and annexes Fergana and Otrar
1210		Buraq Hajib is captured by Muhammad II of Khwarezm
1211		The Karluks rebel against the Qara Khitai and switch sides to the Mongol Empire of Genghis Khan
1211		Muhammad II of Khwarezm seizes Uzgen
1211		Qara Khitai defeats Kuchlug but the returning army is refused entry into Balasagun due to being mistaken for Khwarazmian troops and ends up massacring the entire city
1211		Kuchlug ambushes and captures Yelü Zhilugu, after which he usurps the throne of the Qara Khitai
1211		Kuchlug attacks Ozar of Almaliq unsuccessfully, and Ozar submits to the Mongol Empire of Genghis khan
1213		Yelü Zhilugu dies
1214		Kuchlug captures Kashgar
1216		Jebe of the Mongol Empire attacks the Qara Khitai and seizes Kashgar
1218		Kuchlug is captured and executed by the Mongol Empire; so ends the Qara Khitai

=== 1220s ===
Year	Date	Event
1224		Buraq Hajib becomes governor of Kerman and converts to Islam, at which point the caliph grants him the title of Qutlugh Sultan
1226		Buraq Hajib rebels against the Khwarazmian dynasty
1227	September	Emperor Mozhu of Western Xia surrenders to the Mongol Empire and is promptly executed; so ends the Western Xia

=== 1230s ===
Year	Date	Event
1232		Buraq Hajib submits to the Mongol Empire and becomes Qutlugh Khan
1234	9 February	Siege of Caizhou: Emperor Aizong of Jin abdicates to a distant relative, Hudun, who becomes Emperor Mo of Jin, and commits suicide; Emperor Mo of Jin is killed by the Mongols; so ends the Jin dynasty
1235		Buraq Hajib dies
1236		Qutb al-Din, cousin of Buraq Hajib, comes to power and is succeeded by Rukn al-Din, son of Buraq Hajib

=== 1250s ===
Year	Date	Event
1252		Rukn al-Din is succeeded by Qutb al-Din, cousin of Buraq Hajib and husband of his daughter Kutlugh Turkan
1257		Qutb al-Din is succeeded by his wife Kutlugh Turkan

=== 1270s ===
Year	Date	Event
1279	19 March	Battle of Yamen: Mongol fleet annihilates the Song fleet and Zhao Bing dies at sea; so ends the Song dynasty

=== 1280s ===
Year	Date	Event
1282		Kutlugh Turkan is succeeded by her stepson Soyurghatmish

=== 1290s ===
Year	Date	Event
1292		Soyurghatmish is succeeded by Padishah Khatun, daughter of Qutb al-Din and Kutlugh Turkan
1296		Padishah Khatun is succeeded by Sultan b. Hajjaj, son of Kutlugh Turkan and Qutb al-Din

== 14th century ==
Year	Date	Event
1304		Sultan b. Hajjaj is succeeded by Jahan, son of Soyurghatmish
1306		Öljaitü of the Ilkhanate deposes Jahan and installs a Mongol governor in Kerman
1307		The last Qutlughkanid Jahan escapes to Shiraz
1328		Jahan's daughter, Qutlugh Khatun, marries Mubariz al-Din Muhammad, the founder of the Muzaffarids
1340		Mubariz al-Din Muhammad takes Kerman and reinstates the Qara Khitai

== 19th century ==
Year	Date	Event
1811		People of the Ili region are still calling themselves the Qara Khitai

== See also ==
- Administrative divisions of the Liao dynasty

== Bibliography ==
- Andrade, Tonio (2016), The Gunpowder Age: China, Military Innovation, and the Rise of the West in World History, Princeton University Press, ISBN 978-0-691-13597-7.
- Asimov, M.S. (1998), History of civilizations of Central Asia Volume IV The age of achievement: A.D. 750 to the end of the fifteenth century Part One The historical, social and economic setting, UNESCO Publishing
- Barfield, Thomas (1989), The Perilous Frontier: Nomadic Empires and China, Basil Blackwell
- Barrett, Timothy Hugh (2008), The Woman Who Discovered Printing, Great Britain: Yale University Press, ISBN 978-0-300-12728-7 (alk. paper)
- Beckwith, Christopher I (1987), The Tibetan Empire in Central Asia: A History of the Struggle for Great Power among Tibetans, Turks, Arabs, and Chinese during the Early Middle Ages, Princeton University Press
- Biran, Michal (2005), The Empire of the Qara Khitai in Eurasian History: Between China and the Islamic World, Cambridge Studies in Islamic Civilization, Cambridge, England: Cambridge University Press, ISBN 0521842263
- Bregel, Yuri (2003), An Historical Atlas of Central Asia, Brill
- Drompp, Michael Robert (2005), Tang China And The Collapse Of The Uighur Empire: A Documentary History, Brill
- Ebrey, Patricia Buckley (1999), The Cambridge Illustrated History of China, Cambridge: Cambridge University Press, ISBN 0-521-66991-X (paperback).
- Ebrey, Patricia Buckley; Walthall, Anne; Palais, James B. (2006), East Asia: A Cultural, Social, and Political History, Boston: Houghton Mifflin, ISBN 0-618-13384-4
- Golden, Peter B. (1992), An Introduction to the History of the Turkic Peoples: Ethnogenesis and State-Formation in Medieval and Early Modern Eurasia and the Middle East, OTTO HARRASSOWITZ · WIESBADEN
- Graff, David A. (2002), Medieval Chinese Warfare, 300–900, Warfare and History, London: Routledge, ISBN 0415239559
- Graff, David Andrew (2016), The Eurasian Way of War Military Practice in Seventh-Century China and Byzantium, Routledge, ISBN 978-0-415-46034-7.
- Haywood, John (1998), Historical Atlas of the Medieval World, AD 600-1492, Barnes & Noble
- Latourette, Kenneth Scott (1964), The Chinese, their history and culture, Volumes 1-2, Macmillan
- Lorge, Peter A. (2008), The Asian Military Revolution: from Gunpowder to the Bomb, Cambridge University Press, ISBN 978-0-521-60954-8
- Luttwak, Edward N. (2009), The Grand Strategy of the Byzantine Empire, The Belknap Press of Harvard University Press
- Millward, James (2009), Eurasian Crossroads: A History of Xinjiang, Columbia University Press
- Mote, F. W. (2003), Imperial China: 900–1800, Harvard University Press, ISBN 978-0674012127
- Needham, Joseph (1986), Science & Civilisation in China, vol. V:7: The Gunpowder Epic, Cambridge University Press, ISBN 0-521-30358-3
- Rong, Xinjiang (2013), Eighteen Lectures on Dunhuang, Brill
- Schafer, Edward H. (1985), The Golden Peaches of Samarkand: A study of T'ang Exotics, University of California Press
- Shaban, M. A. (1979), The ʿAbbāsid Revolution, Cambridge: Cambridge University Press, ISBN 0-521-29534-3
- Sima, Guang (2015), Bóyángbǎn Zīzhìtōngjiàn 54 huánghòu shīzōng 柏楊版資治通鑑54皇后失蹤, Yuǎnliú chūbǎnshìyè gǔfèn yǒuxiàn gōngsī, ISBN 978-957-32-0876-1
- Skaff, Jonathan Karam (2012), Sui-Tang China and Its Turko-Mongol Neighbors: Culture, Power, and Connections, 580-800 (Oxford Studies in Early Empires), Oxford University Press
- Standen, Naomi (2007), Unbounded Loyalty Frontier Crossings in Liao China, University of Hawai'i Press
- Steinhardt, Nancy Shatzman (1997), Liao Architecture, University of Hawaii Press
- Twitchett, Denis C. (1979), The Cambridge History of China, Vol. 3, Sui and T'ang China, 589–906, Cambridge University Press
- Twitchett, Denis (1994), "The Liao", The Cambridge History of China, Volume 6, Alien Regime and Border States, 907–1368, Cambridge: Cambridge University Press, pp. 43–153, ISBN 0521243319
- Twitchett, Denis (2009), The Cambridge History of China Volume 5 The Sung dynasty and its Predecessors, 907-1279, Cambridge University Press
- Wang, Zhenping (2013), Tang China in Multi-Polar Asia: A History of Diplomacy and War, University of Hawaii Press
- Whiting, Marvin C. (2002), Imperial Chinese Military History, Writers Club Press
- Wilkinson, Endymion (2015). Chinese History: A New Manual, 4th edition. Cambridge, MA: Harvard University Asia Center distributed by Harvard University Press. ISBN 9780674088467.
- Xiong, Victor Cunrui (2000), Sui-Tang Chang'an: A Study in the Urban History of Late Medieval China (Michigan Monographs in Chinese Studies), U OF M CENTER FOR CHINESE STUDIES, ISBN 0892641371
- Xiong, Victor Cunrui (2009), Historical Dictionary of Medieval China, United States of America: Scarecrow Press, Inc., ISBN 978-0810860537
- Xu, Elina-Qian (2005), HISTORICAL DEVELOPMENT OF THE PRE-DYNASTIC KHITAN, Institute for Asian and African Studies 7
- Xue, Zongzheng (1992), Turkic peoples, 中国社会科学出版社
- Yuan, Shu (2001), Bóyángbǎn Tōngjiàn jìshìběnmò 28 dìèrcìhuànguánshídài 柏楊版通鑑記事本末28第二次宦官時代, Yuǎnliú chūbǎnshìyè gǔfèn yǒuxiàn gōngsī, ISBN 957-32-4273-7
- Yule, Henry (1915), Cathay and the Way Thither: Being a Collection of Medieval Notices of China, Vol I: Preliminary Essay on the Intercourse Between China and the Western Nations Previous to the Discovery of the Cape Route, Hakluyt Society
