= Kurdujin Khatun =

Ilkhanid princess

Ruler of Kirman
- Reign: June/July 1295 – November 1295
- Predecessor: Padishah Khatun
- Successor: Muzaffar al-Din Mohammad

Ruler of Shiraz
- Reign: 1319–1338
- Predecessor: Abish Khatun
- Successor: Sultan Khatun or Injuids
- Born: After 1273
- Died: 1338
- Spouse: Suyurghatmish; Chupan
- Issue: Yagi Basti
- House: Borjigin (paternal line); Salghurids (maternal line); Qutluqkhanid (by marriage); Chobanids (by marriage)
- Father: Möngke Temür
- Mother: Abish Khatun

Kurdujin Khatun (prior to 1273–1338) was an Ilkhanid princess who ruled Kerman from 1295 to 1296, and Shiraz from 1319 to 1338.

== Life ==
Kurdujin Khatun was born to Abish Khatun and Möngke Temür, the son of Hulagu Khan.

=== First Marriage ===
Kurdujin's marriage to Suyurgatmish of Kerman, a Khitan ruler, helped her new husband gain many allies, including Suqunjaq Noyan (governor of Iraq), Khuzestan, and Qutui Khatun, the mother of Tekuder. Suyurgatmish was confirmed as the new ruler of Kerman by Tekuder in 1282.

Kurdujin further extended her influence when she inherited her mother's estate in 1286. However, after Gaykhatu's coronation, the political climate suddenly changed, and Padishah Khatun, who became the ruler of Kerman, imprisoned Suyurgatmish. Kurdujin helped her husband to escape, but he was captured and executed on August 21, 1294.

=== Struggle against Padishah Khatun ===
Kurdujin Khatun got revenge when Baydu, the son-in-law of Suyurgatmish, ascended to the throne. Baydu demanded that Padishah Khatun come to his coronation ceremony. After gathering allies, Kurdujin invaded Kerman and besieged the city. Around the same time, some of Padishah Khatun's emirs changed loyalties to Kurdujin. These included Emir Timur, Emir Shadi, Emir Mubarek, and her nephew, Nasrat al-Din Yulukshah.

Padishah Khatun finally surrendered the city and sent the keys to Kurdujin. Padishah was imprisoned and later accused of treason. Kurdujin Khatun obtained the order to execute Padishah Khatun from Baydu, thanks to her stepdaughter, Shah Alam. Padishah was executed near Kushk-e Zar in June or July 1295.

After her victorious entrance, Kurdujin Khatun ruled Kerman briefly in 1295. However, she was soon replaced by Muzaffar al-Din Mohammad, Muzaffar al-Din Hajjaj's son, in 1295, on order of Ghazan, the new Ilkhan.

=== Later life ===
Khatun lived in Shiraz for some time. She gave refuge to her stepson Qutb al-Din Shah Jahan in 1306, when he was deprived of ruling Kerman by Öljeitü.

In 1319, she ruled Shiraz in her own right on the order of Abu Said, but the rule was limited to the city and symbolic. She is sometimes listed as the 11th ruler of the Salghurids. While a descendant of the Salghurids was still nominal ruler in Fars, Mahmud of the Injuids controlled Fars. The death of Kurdujin is said to have occurred in c. 1338.

After Kurdujin's death, her niece Sultan Khatun succeeded her in Shiraz. However, it is unlikely that this information is accurate.

== Marriages ==
Khatun married 4 times in her life:

1. Suyurgatmish (ended in 1294): Ruler of Kerman
2. Amir Taj al-Din Satilmish, formerly a supporter of Kutlugh Turkan.
3. Toghai, a basqaq who was Satilmish's nephew, arrived at Fars in 1320.
4. Amir Chupan (died in 1327), with whom she had three sons:
  - Siukshah
  - Yagi Basti
  - Nowruz

Abu Said promised to marry her to Ghiyath-uddin ibn Rukn-uddin, the Kartid ruler of Herat, but Baghdad Khatun prevented this move.

== Legacy ==
She was mentioned in the works of the historian Wassaf, who praised her for being charitable. She also founded the Madrasa-i Shahi (Royal College) in Shiraz.

== Ancestors ==
Ancestors of Kurdujin Khatun

16. Genghis Khan
8. Tolui
17. Börte
4. Hulagu Khan
18. Jakha Gambhu
9. Sorghaghtani Beki
2. Mengü Temür
20. Quduqa Beki
10. Torolchi of Oirats
5. Oljai Khatun
22. Genghis Khan
11. Checheikhen
23. Börte
1. Kurdujin Khatun
24. Sa'd I
12. Qutlugh Khan Abu Bakr
6. Sa'd II
3. Abish Khatun
28. Qotb al-Din Abu Mansur
14. Alauddawla Mahmud Shah
7. Turkan Khatun
30. Buraq Hajib
15. Yaqut Turkan
