= Baydu =

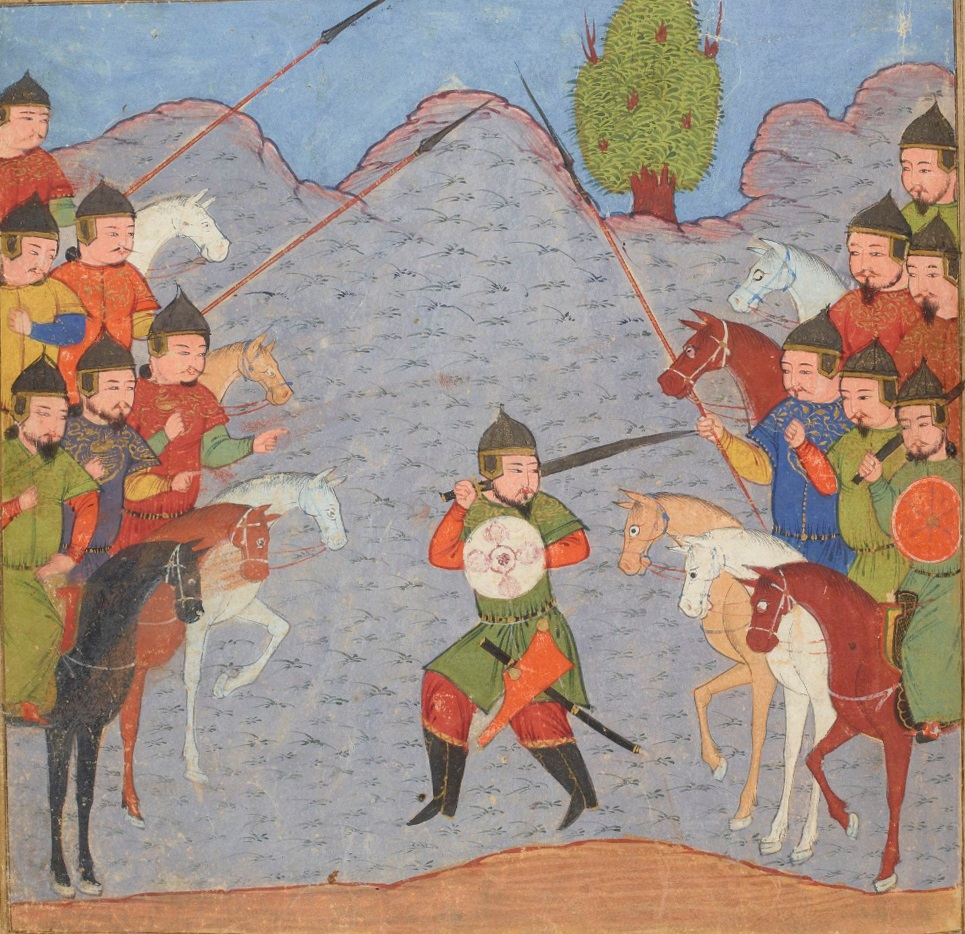
- Negotiations between representatives of Ghazan and Baydu. Miniature from the manuscript of Jami' al-tawarikh. 15th century, Herat

Ilkhan
- Reign: 24 March 1295 – 4 October 1295
- Predecessor: Gaykhatu
- Successor: Ghazan
- Vizier: Jamal ud-Din Dastgerdani
- Born: 1255 or 1256; Mongolia
- Died: 4 October 1295; Outside Tabriz
- House: Borjigin
- Dynasty: Hulaguid
- Father: Taraqai
- Mother: Qaraqcin

Baydu (Mongolian script:ᠪᠠᠶᠢᠳᠤ; Mongolian: Байду) (died 1295) was the sixth ruler of the Ilkhanate in West Asia, division of the Mongol Empire based on the Iranian Plateau. He was the son of Taraqai, who was in turn the fifth son of Hulagu Khan. He succeeded his cousin Gaykhatu as khan of the Ilkhanate in 1295.

== Life ==
He was born in Mongolia to Taraqai and Qaraqcin. His father was Hulagu's fifth son and was killed by lightning strike on his way to Iran. Baydu and his mother arrived in Iran with Qutui Khatun's camp alongside Tekuder and other princes in 1269. Reportedly, he never commanded an army and was considered to be easily controlled by Mongol emirs. He participated in Abaqa Khan's invasion of Syria in 1281. During his predecessors' reigns, he was a viceroy in Jazira.

=== Under Gaykhatu ===
He was considered one of candidates to the Ilkhanid throne after death of Arghun. Nobles like Taghachar, Qoncuqbal, Toghan, and Tuqal supported Baydu. However he refused the throne, stating throne belongs to the brother or a son according to yassa, while Mahmud Aqsarai simply states that when Baydu didn't appear at the kurultai, Gaykhatu was enthroned instead. Baydu stood stationed in Baghdad and even travelled to the coronation feast of the new khan Gaykhatu. However, after getting drunk Gaykhatu insulted Baydu telling one of his servants to hit Baydu. This grew a resentment in Baydu towards him. Baydu left hastily towards to his appanage near Baghdad leaving his son Qipchak as a hostage in Gaykhatu's court. He was supported by Oirat emir Chichak (son of Sulaimish b. Tengiz Güregen), Lagzi Küregen (son of Arghun Aqa), El-Temur (son of Hinduqur Noyan) and Todachu Yarquchi, who followed him to Baghdad. He was also aided by his vizier Jamal ud-Din Dastgerdani. According to Hamdullah Qazwini, Baydu's main motivation on moving against Gaykhatu was his sexual advances against Qipchak.

=== Revolt ===
When son-in-law Ghurbatai Güregen brought him news of treachery, Gaykhatu ordered arrest of several amirs including his personal keshig Tuladai, Qoncuqbal, Tukal, Bughdai, including Kipchak and put into jail in Tabriz. While his followers Hasan and Taiju demanded their executions, Taghachar advised against it. Baydu on his side, moved to kill Muhammad Sugurchi, governor of Baghdad and arrested governor Baybuqa of Diyarbakir. Gaykhatu sent his father-in-law Aq Buqa and Taghachar against Baydu on 17 March 1295, himself arriving at Tabriz 4 days later. Little he knew that Taghachar already shifted allegiance to Baydu who left for his encampment at night. While he wanted to flee to Anatolia, his councillors advised to fight against Baydu. Nevertheless, Gaykhatu fled to Mughan. Arriving in Tabriz, Taghachar set Qoncuqbal and Tuladai free, while Gaikhatu desperately begged for mercy. Despite his appeal, he was strangled by a bowstring so as to avoid bloodshed on 21 March 1295. However, some sources put this event on 5 March or 25 April.

=== Reign ===
Baydu was considered easygoing and controllable, and under him, the Ilkhanate was divided among the co-conspirators. However, Gaykhatu's death was not without consequences, especially Prince Ghazan in Khorasan grew restless. Baydu explained the fact that Ghazan was away during events leading to Gaykhatu's fall, therefore nobles had no choice but to raise him to throne. Nevertheless, Amir Nowruz encouraged Ghazan to take steps against Baydu, because he was nothing but a figurehead under grips of nobles. Mar Yahballaha III also noted Baydu being a weak khan. Conspirators divided the empire between themselves: Taghachar took governorate of Anatolia, Tuladai gained Persian Iraq and Lorestan, while Qoncoqbal took Shiraz and Shabankara to himself Tukal went back to his ancestral lands in Georgia. Meanwhile, his mother-in-law Kurdujin Khatun was installed as governor of Kerman and had Padishah Khatun executed. Aq Buqa Jalair, chief commander of Gaykhatu was also killed on demands of Qoncuqbal.

Ghazan started to move against Baydu toward his headquarters in Azerbaijan. Baydu's forces commanded by Ildar Oghul (his cousin and Prince Ajay's son) met him near Qazvin. First battle was won by Ghazan but he had to fall back after realizing Ildar's contingent was just a fraction of whole army, leaving Nowruz behind. After a short truce, Baydu offered Ghazan co-ruling of Ilkhanate and Nowruz the post of sahib-i divan to which as a counter-condition Ghazan demanded the revenues of his father's hereditary lands in Fars, Persian Iraq, and Kerman. Nowruz denied conditions, which led to its arrest. According to an anecdote, he promised to bring Ghazan back tied-up on condition of his release. Once he reached Ghazan, he sent back a cauldron to Baydu; a word play on the Turkish word kazan.

Amir Nowruz promised him the throne and his help on a condition of Ghazan's conversion to Islam. Nowruz entered Qazvin with 4,000 soldiers and claimed an additional number of 120,000 on his way toward Azerbaijan which caused panic among masses which was followed by defections of Taghachar's subordinates and other powerful emirs like Qurumishi and Chupan. Seeing imminent defeat, Baydu fled to Tukal in Georgia. Baydu attempted to escape and flee from Azerbaijan to Georgia, but was taken prisoner near Nakhchivan he was taken to Tabriz and executed on the 5 October 1295, ending the civil war with his successor. Relatives, including his son Qipchaq (d. 26 September 1295) and Ildar Oghul were also executed.

== Personality ==
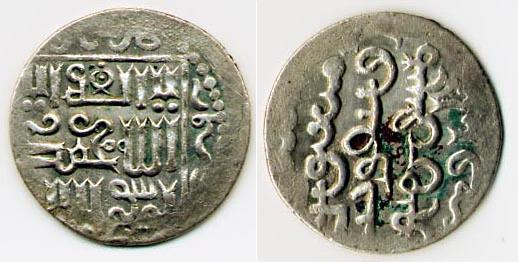
A coin from the reign of Baydu with Uyghur script

Baydu had strong sympathies for Christianity, but was required to act outwardly as a Muslim. Some sources state he did not act even as Muslim. According to Saunders in Mongol Conquests, Baydu allowed churches on his ordo and wore a cross around his neck. He was urged by his followers to rid himself of Ghazan, the son of Arghun Khan, but refused out of affection.

== Family ==
Baydu had three consorts, two of them from Qutlugkhanid dynasty:

- Ordu Qutlugh Khatun, daughter of Qutb al-Din, ruler of Kerman, and full sister of Suyurghatmish;
- Shah Alam Khatun, daughter of Suyurghatmish and Kurdujin Khatun, and granddaughter of Qutb al-Din;
- A daughter of Tuladai

=== Children ===
- Qipchaq – from Shah Alam Khatun, executed together with his father:
  - Qipchaq
  - Muhammad
- Ali;
  - Musa (1336–1337)
- Muhammad; with the daughter of Tuladai
- Yol Qutlugh Khatun, married on 3 July 1295 to Qunchuqbal;

== Notes ==
Regnal titles
Preceded by Gaykhatu	Ilkhan; 1295	Succeeded by Mahmud Ghazan
