= Suyurghatmish =

Suyurqatmish

Ruler of Kirman
- Reign: 1282 – 1292
- Predecessor: Kutlugh Turkan
- Successor: Padishah Khatun
- Died: 21 August 1294; Kerman
- Spouse: Kurdujin Khatun; Ilak Khatun
- Issue: Qutb al-Din Shah Jahan
Names
- Jalal ad-Din Suyurgatmish
- Father: Qutb al-Din Mohammad

Jalal ad-Din Suyurgatmish was Qutlughanid ruler of Kerman and a son of Qutb al-Din Mohammad.

== Life ==
His mother's identity is unknown, he had a full sister Ordu Kutlugh who was married to Baydu. He was a childhood friend with Tekuder, son of Hulagu, a connection that would prove helpful in future. An ambitious person, he went to the court of Abaqa to obtain noble rights of his step-brother Muzaffar al-Din Hajjaj in 1279. Having obtained recognition, he arrived at Kerman on 19 September 1280 and forced her step-mother Kutlugh Turkan to make him a co-ruler by 19 October, had the khutba proclaimed in his name too. A number of members of the court joined Suyurgatmish, including Muiz al-Din Malekshah, a high ranking noble. However she soon "complained to her daughter Padishah Khatun and received a yarligh forbidding her stepson to meddle in the affairs of Kirman".

== Reign ==
Following Abaqa's death in 1281, he obtained a great power due to his friendship with Tekuder, new Ilkhan. He was also allied to Suqunjaq Noyan - governor of Iraq and Khuzestan and Qutui Khatun - mother of Tekuder. He was confirmed as the new ruler of Kirman by Tekuder in 1282. Although Kutlugh Turkan's loyalists in Kirman, namely Amir Satilmish, Amir Muhammad Qutlugh Tash, Amir Muhammad Ayad Güz and Amir Muhammad Alamdar tried to raise Soyokshah - her daughter Bibi Turkan's son to throne, this proved futile when Soyokshah revealed the plot. Suyurgatmish's protege Qutui persuaded Tekuder to support Suyurgatmish against a possible alliance with rival prince Arghun. His next years spent in constant power struggle between his siblings Bibi Turkan and Padishah Khatun.

== Death ==
While he managed to secure his throne thanks to powerful chief minister Buqa, this situation came to an abrupt end in 1291 with death of Arghun. Padishah Khatun who was now married to new Ilkhan Gaykhatu, demanded lordship over Kirman to which Ilkhan agreed. He was imprisoned by Padishah in October 1292. However he managed to escape thanks to his wife Kurdujin Khatun, only to be imprisoned again. Suyurgatmish was finally strangled to death on 21 August 1294.

== Family ==
He was married to Kurdujin Khatun a daughter of Abish Khatun - daughter of Sad II, Atabeg of Fars and Mengü Timur - son of Hulegu and a certain Ilak Khatun. She also had a concubine named Isen. They had following issues:

- Shah Alam — married to Baydu
- Qutb al-Din Shah Jahan — ruler of Kerman between 1304–1306.
