= Muzaffar al-Din Hajjaj =

Qutlugh-Khanid prince (b. 1247, d. 1291)

Co-ruler of Kirman
- Reign: 1257 – 1267
- Predecessor: Qutb al-Din Mohammad
- Successor: Kutlugh Turkan (as sole ruler)
- Co-ruler: Kutlugh Turkan
- Born: c. 1247; Kerman
- Died: July 1291 (aged 43–44)
Names
- Muzaffar al-Din Hajjaj Sultan
- Father: Qutb al-Din Mohammad
- Mother: Kutlugh Turkan

Muzaffar al-Din Hajjaj was a nominal Qutlughkhanid prince of Kerman, a son of Qutb al-Din Mohammad and Kutlugh Turkan.

== Life ==
Muzaffar al-Din Hajjaj was a minor when his father Qutb al-Din Mohammad died in 1257. Kerman nobles assembled and asked Hulegu for Kutlugh Turkan's appointment as the ruler of the principality. Hulegu confirmed Hajjaj as the new ruler of Kerman, while Kutlugh Turkan was assigned only the civil affairs. Hajjaj's brother-in-law Azad al-Din Hajji was confirmed as the supreme commander, much to Turkan's displeasure, who later obtained full sovereign rights.

Hajjaj married Arghun Aqa's daughter Begi Khatun - a woman his father wanted to marry - in 1264. This was the year when Turkan was acknowledged by Hulegu as a ruler in her own right, putting Hajjaj under her shadow. Once he reached adulthood, Hajjaj began to fight at the front of the Ilkhanid army ranks, Chagataid where he achieved fame. This was confirmed when he was honored by Abaqa in 1270. According to "History of Qara-Khitai Shahs" (Tāriḵ-e šāhi-e Qarāḵtāʾiān), he grew ambitious and asked Turkan to dance in front of her while his followers chanted "The sky and the stars are old. Your fortuitous lot is young. It would be better if the old would give its turn to the young!". Tarkan hastily left for Padishah Khatun's headquarters in order to quell Hajjaj's upcoming uprising.

== Exile and death ==
Hajjaj contacted several Ögedeid and Chagataid princes to plot against Abaqa. This plot was revealed when some of his ministers and commanders, including Taj al-Din Satilmish defected to Turkan, who in turn asked for Abaqa's interference. Learning of Abaqa's advance to Kirman, he left for Sistan in 1275 and then for Delhi Sultanate in 1279. His wife and children were taken to Abaqa's court, his lands were confiscated, then granted to Suyurgatmish. He died in July 1291.

== Family ==
He was married to Begi Khatun, daughter of Arghun Aqa and had at least 4 issues:

- Qutb al-Din Taghishah — ruled Sirjan.
- Muzaffar al-Din Mohammad — ruled Kirman from 1296 to 1304
- Mahmudshah
- Ala al-Din Hasanshah (with Begi Khatun)
- Dundi Shah Khatun (with Begi Khatun)
