= El Qutlugh Khatun =

Early 14th century Ilkhanate princess

El Qutlugh
- Noble family: Borjigin
- Spouse: Ghurbatai Güregen
- Father: Abaqa Khan
- Mother: Bulujin Egechi

El Qutlugh Khatun (Persian: ايلقتلغ; fl. 1323) was the daughter of Abaqa Khan (r. 1265–82), the second Mongol ruler of the Ilkhanate. Her story, included in Khalīl ibn Aybeg al-Ṣafadī's (around 1297-1363) bibliographic dictionary, sheds light on changing gender norms during the widespread conversion in the Ilkhanate to Islam. Her story also depicts the status of women during the period.

== The Hajj ==
It is unclear how many women went on the Hajj during the pre-modern era. According to al-Ṣafadī', however, El Qutlugh was one of the women who did make the journey. She travelled on horseback (not in a palanquin fastened to a camel) with a quiver of arrows at her waist. There were differences in her journey in comparison to the wives of senior Mamluk officials from the same period. Her Hajj trip took place in 1323.

== Family ==
She was married to Ghurbatai Güregen from the Hushin tribe. Her husband was active during Arghun and Gaykhatu's reign, and supported the latter during Baydu's revolt. He also had two children named Beglemish and Bitigchi, although it is not known if El Qutlugh was their mother. Ghurbatai was murdered some time after Gaykhatu's reign and El Qutlugh was known to have avenged him, however exact date is not known.

== Ghazan's death ==
Mamluk sources credit her with inciting Bulughan Khatun to poison Ghazan Khan.
