= Muzaffar al-Din Mohammad =

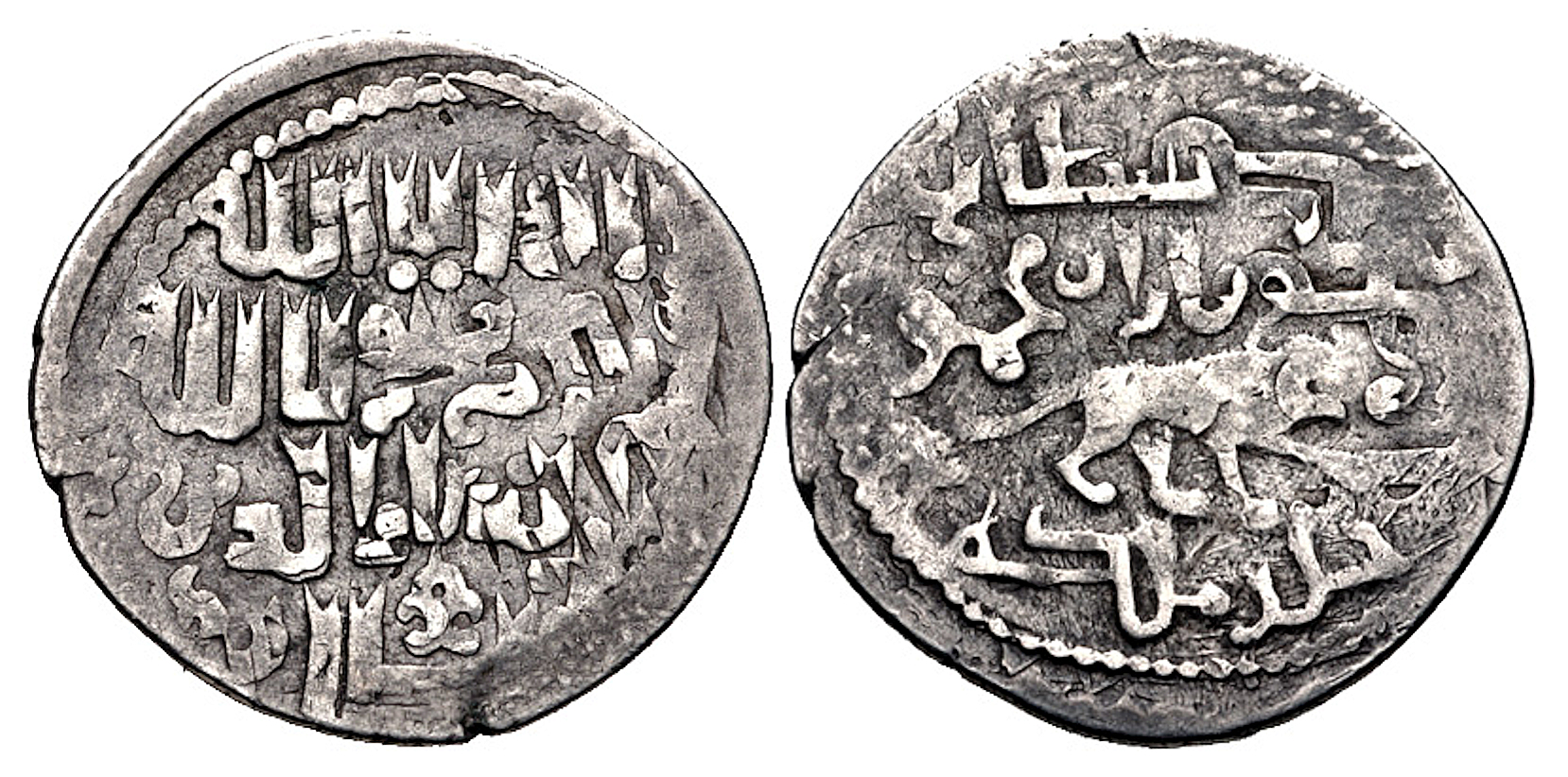
- Coinage of Muzaffar al-Din Mohammad Shah Sultan (r.1296-1304). Citing the Il-khanate ruler Ghazan Mahmud as overlord.

Ruler of Kirman
- Reign: 1296 – 1304
- Predecessor: Kurdujin Khatun
- Successor: Qutb al-Din Shah Jahan
- Born: Kerman
- Died: 1304; Kerman
Names
- Muzaffar al-Din Abu'l Harith Muhammad Shah Sultan
- Father: Muzaffar al-Din Hajjaj
- Mother: Begi Khatun

Muzaffar al-Din Mohammad was the penultimate Qutlughkhanid ruler of Kerman.

== Life ==
He was the son of Muzaffar al-Din Hajjaj. He succeeded Kurdujin Khatun as hereditary ruler of Kerman on the order of Ghazan in 1295/1296. One of his first orders was to bring remains of her aunt Padishah Khatun to be reburied in Kerman. His reign was troubled by rebellions of his cousins Nasrat al-Din Yulukshah, Ghiyath ad-Din Solokshah and his brother Qutb al-Din Taghishah - ruler of Sirjan. His brutal repression of them made him unpopular to the point of resignation of his vizier Fakhraddin Harawi. He was reported to be cruel to his half brothers Hasanshah and Mahmudshah too. He died in 1304 from excessive drinking of wine.

He was succeeded by his cousin Qutb al-Din Shah Jahan.
