= Qutb al-Din Shah Jahan =

Ruler of Kirman
- Reign: 1304 – 21 April 1305
- Predecessor: Muzaffar al-Din Mohammad
- Successor: Malik Nasiruddin Mohammad b. Burhan
- Born: Kerman
- Died: Shiraz
- Issue: Makhdum Shah
Names
- Qutb al-Din Shah Jahan Sultan
- Father: Suyurghatmish
- Mother: Ilak Khatun
- Religion: Islam

Qutb al-Din Shah Jahan was the last Qutlughkhanid ruler of Kerman.

== Life ==
He was a son of Suyurghatmish. His reign was brief after his succession to his cousin. He was reported to be cruel, corrupt and extremely tempered. He was replaced by a Mongol governor Malik Nasiraddin Mohammad on the orders of Öljeitu. He lived the rest of his life in Shiraz with her step-mother Kurdujin Khatun. His daughter Makhdum Shah was married to Mubariz al-Din Muhammad in 1328, who became the founder of Muzaffarid dynasty.
