= Qutb al-Din Mohammad =

Qutlughanid ruler of Kerman (r.1252-1257)

Ruler of Kirman (first reign)
- Reign: 1235
- Predecessor: Buraq Hajib
- Successor: Rukn al-Din Mubarak Khwaja

Ruler of Kirman (second reign)
- Reign: 1252 - 1257
- Predecessor: Rukn al-Din Mubarak Khwaja
- Successor: Kutlugh Turkan and Hajjaj
- Died: 1257; Kerman
- Spouse: Kutlugh Turkan
- Issue: Muzaffar al-Din Hajjaj; Suyurghatmish; Padishah Khatun
Names
- Qutb al-Din Abu'l Fath Mohammad
- Father: Hamīd Pur

Qutb al-Din Mohammad — was Qutlughanid ruler of Kerman and a nephew of Buraq Hajib, founder of dynasty.

== Life ==
He was a son of Hamīd Pur (or Khan Temür), thus a nephew of Buraq Hajib. His father was an emir in service of Khwarazmshah dynasty, who served as commander of Bukhara in c. 1220.

== First reign and exile ==
He succeeded his uncle Buraq Hajib in 1235 and married Kutlugh Turkan on 5 September 1235. However, his reign was very short as he was quickly replaced by his cousin Rukn al-Din on the order of Ögedei Khan. He left for Mongolia through Shahdad-Zozan route and was ordered to join Mahmud Yalavach in China as soon as he arrived. He was present at Güyük Khan's election in 1246, from whom he asked to be recognized as ruler of Kirman once again. However, this was discouraged by Güyük's trusted advisor Chinqai who was a tutor to Rukn al-Din previously.

== Second reign ==
His aspiration to rule Kirman again was realized after Güyük's and Chinqai's subsequent deaths in 1251. He acquired yarligh from Möngke Khan to rule Kerman same year. As the result, Rukn al-Din fled to his nephew Salghur shah - Atabeg of Yazd with his mother Uka Khatun in 1252, later getting into contact with Caliph al-Mustasim. When Möngke heard of this treason thanks to a commander named Buqa, he authorised Qutb al-Din to execute his cousin. Sometime later he suppressed a rebellion by a person claiming to be Jalal ad-Din. He was confirmed as a vassal to Hulagu Khan and made many visits to his court. He died in 1257/1258 and was succeeded by his wife Kutlugh Turkan.

== Family ==
He was married to Kutlugh Turkan (or Khan Turkan, a daughter of Buraq Hajib), but had other sons from different wives and concubines:

- Muzaffar al-Din Hajjaj Sultan (with Kutlugh Turkan)
- Jalal al-Din Suyurgatmish
- Padishah Khatun (with Kutlugh Turkan) — married to Abaqa, then Gaykhatu.
- Bibi Turkan (with Kutlugh Turkan) — married Adud al-Din Amir Hajji, then Shams al-Din b. Malik Tazigu
- Ordu Kutlugh (full sister of Suyurgatmish) — married to Baydu.
- Yul Kutlugh — married to Malikshah b. Sam
