= Qutb ad-Din =

Qutb ad-Din or Qutb-ud-Din (Arabic: قطب‌ الدین, romanized: quṭb ad-dīn; ALA-LC: Quṭb al-Dīn) is an Arabic male given name translated as 'the pivot of the faith' or 'axis of the faith'.

Notable people with this given name include:

- Qutb al-din Hasan (died 1100), king of the Ghurid dynasty
- Qutb al-Din Muhammad, or Muhammad I of Khwarazm (died 1127), appointed Shah of Khwarazm by the Seljuk sultan
- Qutb al-Din Mawdud (died 1170), Zengid Emir of Mosul
- Qutb al-Din Aibak (died 1210), founder of the Mamluk Sultanate of Delhi
- Qutb ad-Din Muhammad (died 1219), Zengid Emir of Sinjar
- Qutb ad-Dīn Haydar (died ca. 1221), Persian Sufi saint
- Qutbuddin Bakhtiar Kaki (1173–1235), Indian Sufi saint
- Qutb al-Din Mohammad (d. 1257) member of Qutlugh-Khanids, married Kutlugh Turkan
- Qutb al-Din al-Shirazi (1236–1311), Persian scientist, musician and poet
- Qutb al-Din Razi (1295–1365) Persian Islamic philosopher, logician and jurist
- Qutb ud din Mubarak Shah (died 1320), ruler of the Khilji dynasty in India
- Qutb al-Din Muhammad (died 1346), Mihrabanid malik of Sistan
- Qutb al-Din ibn 'Izz al-Din (died 1386), Mihrabanid malik of Sistan
- Qutb al-Din Muhammad ibn Shams al-Din Shah 'Ali (c. 1366 – 1419), Mihrabanid malik of Sistan
- Qutb-ud-Din Ahmad Shah II, Sultan of Gujarat Sultanate from 1451 to 1458
- Qutb-ud-Din Bahadur Shah of Gujarat (died 1537), Sultan of Gujarat Sultanate
- Qutb ud-Din Muhammad Mu'azzam, later Bahadur Shah I (1643–1712), Mughal Emperor
- Ghotbeddin Sadeghi (born 1952), Iranian theatre director, playwright, stage and film actor

== See also ==
- Qutb
- al-Din
