= Kutlugh Turkan =

Ruler of Kirman (r. 1257–1282)

Ruler of Kirman
- Reign: 1257 – 1282
- Confirmation by Hulagu: 1264
- Predecessor: Qutb al-Din Mohammad
- Successor: Suyurghatmish
- Co-ruler: Hajjaj (1257–1267)
- Born: c. 1208/1213; Transoxiana
- Died: 1283 (aged 69–70); Tabriz, Ilkhanate
- Burial: Gubba-i Sabz Mausoleum, Kerman
- Spouse: Buraq Hajib; Qutb al-Din Mohammad
- Issue: Padishah Khatun; Muzaffar al-Din Hajjaj
Names
- Ismat al-Dunya wa al-Din Khodavand Kutlugh Turkan

Kutlugh Turkan (c.1208/1213 – 1283), was a sovereign ruler of Kirman from 1257 until 1282.

== Early life ==
Different accounts exist regarding her early life. According to "History of Qara-Khitai Shahs" (Tāriḵ-e šāhi-e Qarāḵtāʾiān) by anonymous author, she might have been born in Transoxiana between 1208 and 1213 and later sold as a slave to an Isfahani merchant, who adopter her and raised with excellent education. While other sources talk of her as a concubine to Qiyasaddin Pirshah (son of Muhammad II of Khwarazm), then of Buraq Hajib. Although Fatema Mernissi proposed that she was Buraq Hajib's daughter.

She married Qutb al-Din Mohammad on 5 September 1235, a nephew of Buraq Hajib and his successor. However they were sent to Ögedei's court when Buraq Hajib's son Rukn al-Din Mubarak Khawja (d. 1252) was recognized as the new ruler of Kirman. They returned to Kirman when Qutb al-Din was confirmed as new ruler in December 1252 by Möngke. However, she was widowed in September 1257, when their son Hajjaj Sultan was still a minor.

== Reign ==
She was recognized as new sovereign of Kirman by decision of Hulagu Khan and Kirman nobles in 1257. "History of Qara-Khitai Shahs" states she was only supposed to have a say in civil affairs, while her son-in-law Azod-al-Din was in charge of military affairs per order of Hulagu. This situation soon changed when she appealed to Ilkhan to change his decision. She established good connections with Ilkhanate by sending her son to the army of Hulagu.

She was officially confirmed in her title by Hulagu 1264, titled 'Ismat al-dunya wa al-din and had the khutba proclaimed in her name. According to Fatema Mernissi, Kutlugh of Kirman was one of Muslim female rulers who met the Muslim criteria of sovereignty. She obtained Sirjan for her daughter Padishah Khatun when she visited newly crowned Abaqa Khan in 1265. They were soon married in 1272. Next years of her reign were troubled by her sons Hajjaj and Suyurghatmish's contest to her right to rule, who even planned to assassinate her. However, she retreated to Sirjan where her daughter ruled. Hajjaj soon proved an ineffective ruler and had to flee to Delhi Sultanate next year. Her stepson Suyurghatmish arrived in Kerman on 19 September 1280 and forced her to make him a co-ruler by 19 October, had the khutba proclaimed in his name too. She soon "complained to her daughter Padishah Khatun and received a yarligh forbidding her stepson to meddle in the affairs of Kirman".

== Last years ==
The last years of her reign was described as a golden age of Kirman. She funded public granaries in 1263/4, receiving praise from her subjects. She was involved in construction of various public projects such as fortresses (1279), madrasas, hospitals, mosques, qanats and at least 16 charitable organizations. In 1282, however, new Ilkhan Ahmad Tekuder confirmed Suyurghatamish on the throne of Kirman under influence of her mother Qutui Khatun. Kutlugh Tarkan traveled to the Mongol court at Tabriz to protest but without success. She died in summer 1283 in Charandab district of Tabriz. She was buried at Gubba-i Sabz Mausoleum of Qutlughanids in Kirman.

== Family ==
She was married to Qutb al-Din Mohammad on 5 September 1235 and had at least three issues with him:

- Muzaffar al-Din Hajjaj Sultan
- Padishah Khatun (with Kutlugh Turkan) — married to Abaqa, then Gaykhatu.
- Bibi Turkan (with Kutlugh Turkan) — married Adud al-Din Amir Hajji, then Shams al-Din b. Malik Tazigu
