= Padishah Khatun =

Qutlugh-Khanid dynasty ruler of Kirman (1256–1295) (r.1292-1295)

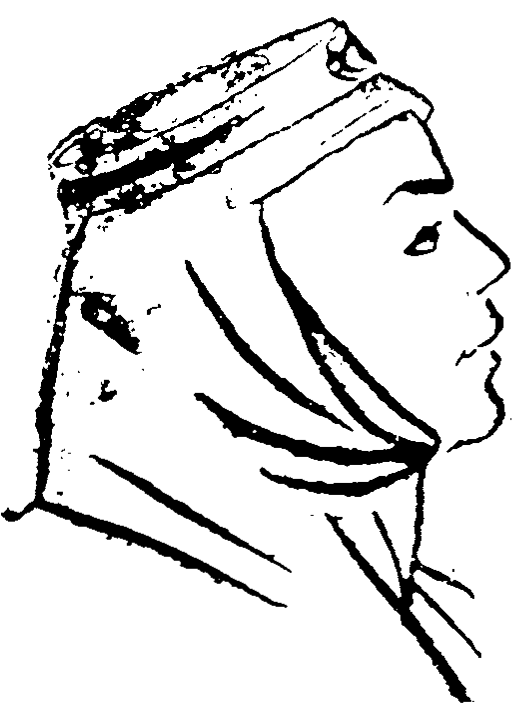
- 1956 drawing of Padishah Khatun

Ruler of Kirman
- Reign: 1292 – 1295
- Predecessor: Suyurghatmish
- Successor: Kurdujin Khatun

Khatun consort of the Ilkhanate
- 1st Tenure: 1272–1282
- 2nd Tenure: 1291–1295
- Born: 1256; Kerman
- Died: June 1295 (aged 38–39); Kushk Sar, Ilkhanate
- Burial: Gonbad-e Sabz Mausoleum, Kerman
- Spouse: Abaqa Khan; Gaykhatu
Names
- Safwat al-Din Padishah Khatun
- House: Qutlugh-Khanid (by birth); Borjigin (by marriage)
- Father: Qutb al-Din Mohammad
- Mother: Kutlugh Turkan
- Religion: Buddhism

Safwat al-Din Khatun (Persian: صفوت الدنیا خاتون; 1256 – 1295), otherwise known as Padishah Khatun (Persian: پادشاه خاتون), was the ruler of Kirman from 1292 until 1295 as a member of the Qutlugh-Khanid dynasty in Persia and a poet in Persian language.

== Life ==
She was born in 1256, as the youngest daughter of Qutb al-Din (d. 1257) and Kutlugh Turkan of Kerman. She already had her own fiefdom in Sirjan thanks to her mother Kutlugh Turkan's visit to coronation ceremony of Abaqa in 1265.

Her first spouse was Abaqa Khan to whom she was married on 22 May 1272. She converted to Buddhism from Islam upon her marriage. The marriage was arranged by her mother to secure Mongol support for her rule. She was granted the household of Abaqa's late mother Yesunjin. She was instrumental in strengthening the rule of her mother Kutlugh Turkan and was her supporter against her siblings Muzaffar al-Din Hajjaj (1276) and Suyurghatmish (1280).

== After Abaqa's death ==
She did not leave for Kerman after Abaqa's death in 1282, choosing to stay in court and live with her mother until her death in 1283. She sent her sister Bibi Khatun to protect her interests in Kirman during her stay in court, ceding Sirjan to her. She obtained to co-rule Kirman due to her influence on Arghun in 1284. However, powerful vizier Buqa ruled in favor of Suyurghatmish, hastily married her to Gaykhatu and thus obtained her removal to Anatolia in 1286. She regained Sirjan in 1289 from Arghun.

== Reign ==
Upon Gaykhatu's election in 1291, Padishah again found herself in a position of power. She demanded to be given the rule of Kirman as her personal fief, which her spouse agreed to. She imprisoned her half-brother Suyurghatmish in October 1292. However he managed to escape thanks to his wife Kurdujin Khatun, only to be imprisoned again. He was finally strangled to death on 21 August 1294. She was soon granted the rule of Yazd and Shabankara. She even meddled in Ormus politics, replacing Rukn al-Din Masud with Sayf al-Din Ayaz as the prince.

She minted coins in Kerman with the regnal name Padishah Khatun, citing her husband the Ilkhan Gaykhatu as overlord with the title Padishah-I Jahan (Ruler of the World/Universe).

== Death ==
When her husband Gaykhatu was assassinated on 21 March 1295, Padishah was thrown into a difficult position. She was immediately imprisoned on orders of Kurdujin Khatun and Shah Alam - Suyurghatmish's widow and daughter. She was strangled to death on her way to Baydu's court in Kushk-e Zar in June/July 1295. She was buried in Gonbad-e Sabz Mausoleum as her mother during reign of Muzaffar al-Din Mohammad.

== Legacy ==
Padishah earned mention in the travel diary of Venetian traveler, Marco Polo, a contemporary of Padishah. He described her as “an ambitious and clever woman, who put her own brother Siyurgutmish to death as a rival.” She had both silver and gold coins struck in her name. She left handful amount of Persian poetry under the pseudonym Lala Khatun and Hasanshah. She described herself as "the child of a mighty Sultan and the fruit of the garden that is the heart of the Turks" in of her poems. She was also skilled at calligraphy.
