= Kushk Sar =

Kushk Sar كوشك سار
- village
- Location within Iran
- Coordinates: 28°41′01″N 52°59′02″E
- Country: Iran
- Province: Fars
- County: Jahrom
- Bakhsh: Simakan
- Rural District: Pol Beh Pain

Population (2006)
  - Total: 694
- Time zone: UTC+3:30 (IRST)
  - Summer (DST): UTC+4:30 (IRDT)

Kushk Sar (Persian: كوشك سار, also Romanized as Kūshk Sār and Kūshk-e Sār) is a village in Pol Beh Pain Rural District, Simakan District, Jahrom County, Fars province, Iran. At the 2006 census, its population was 694, in 150 families.
