= Qutlugh-Khanids =

Mongolic dynasty in Kirman, Iran (1222–1306)

Qutlugh-Khanids Persian: قراختاییان کرمان
- 1222–1306
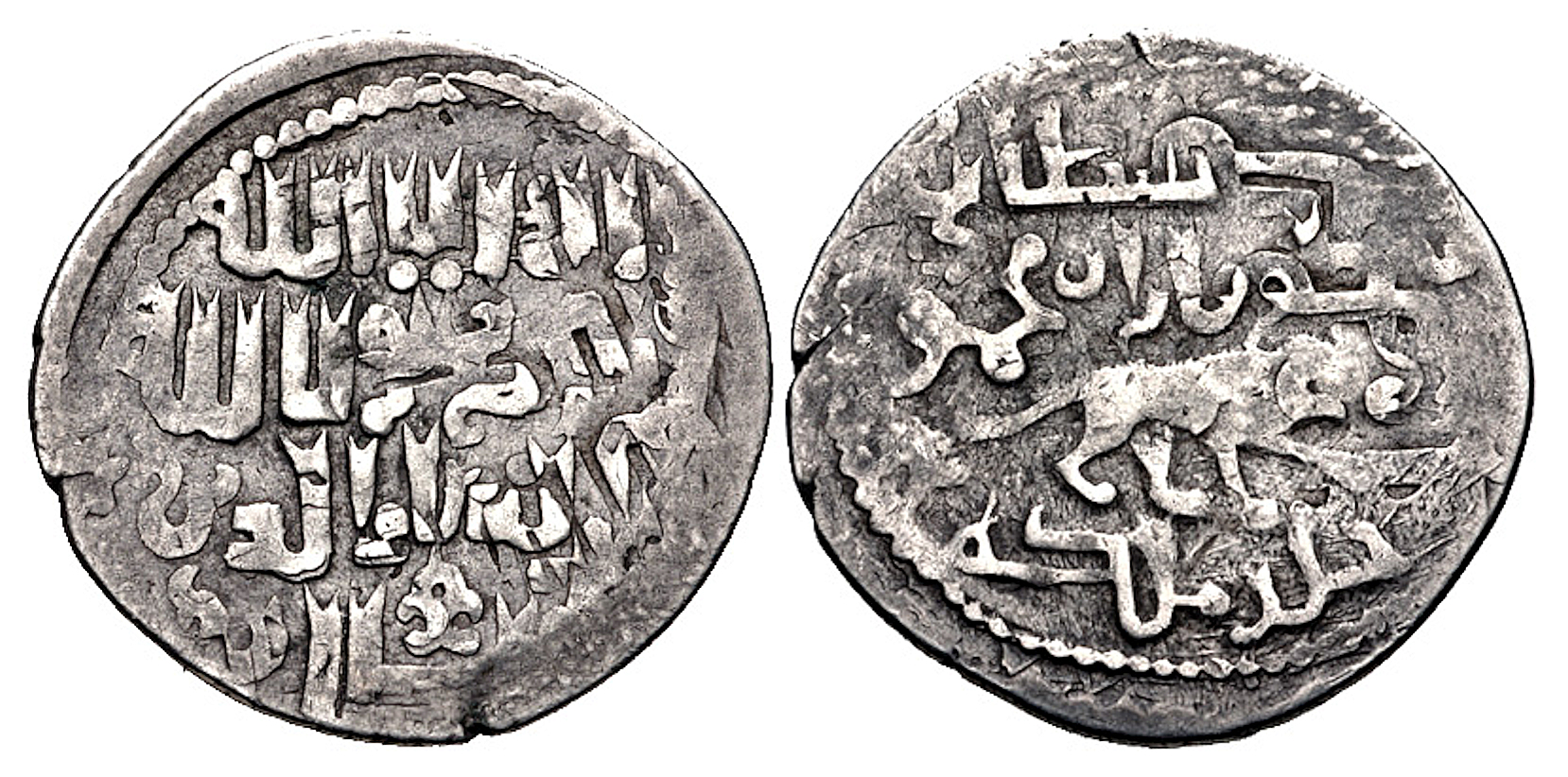
- Coinage of Qutlugh-Khanid ruler Muzaffar al-Din Mohammad Shah Sultan (r.1296–1304). Citing the Il-khanate ruler Ghazan Mahmud as overlord.

- Kirman (in present-day Kerman province, Iran
- Status: Sultanate
- Government: Monarchy
- History
  - Established: 1222
  - Disestablished: 1306
Preceded by
Qara Khitai
Succeeded by
Khwarazmian Empire
Mongol Empire
Ilkhanate
- Today part of: Iran

The Qutlugh-Khanids (Persian: قراختاییان کرمان, otherwise known as the Qutlugh-Khanid dynasty, Kirmanid dynasty, or infrequently as the Later Western Liao; 后西辽) was a dynasty of ethnic Khitan origin that ruled over Kirman (in present-day Kerman province, Iran) from 1222 to 1306.

It was founded by Buraq Hajib, who emigrated from the Qara Khitai (Western Liao dynasty) during the collapse of the realm. Originally an independent entity, the Qutlugh-Khanid dynasty subsequently ruled as vassals of the Khwarazmian Empire, the Mongol Empire and the Ilkhanate. The dynasty was removed from power by the Ilkhanid ruler Öljaitü, who appointed Nasir al-Din Muhammad ibn Burhan as governor of Kirman.

== Later Western Liao ==
Although there was no mention of a dynasty called the "Later Western Liao" (后西辽) in traditional Chinese scholarship, historian Wang Zhilai wrote a paper On the Later Western Liao (关于"后西辽") in 1983, where he proposed to call the Qutlugh-Khanids the "Later Western Liao", thereby positioning the dynasty as an extension of the Western Liao.

The region of Kerman was also settled by non-Muslim Mongol tribes, the Avḡāni and Jormāʾi, who had been granted autonomy by Abaqa Khan (ruled 1265–1282). They were later allies of the Muzaffarids and entered into marital alliances with them.

== End of the Kirmanid dynasty ==
The Mongol Ilkhanid ruler Öljaitü (r. 1304–1316) ended the Kirman Kara-Khitan dynasty in 1306 after the last of the Qutlugh Khans, Quțb al-Dīn II, neglected to pay his dues to the Mongol treasury. The Qutlugh Khan escaped to Shiraz, and his daughter later became the wife of Mubariz al-Din Muhammad, the founder of the Muzaffarid dynasty.

== List of monarchs of the Qutlugh-Khanid dynasty ==
- Baraq Hajib (1222–1235)
- Qutb al-Din Muhammad Khan (1235)
- Rukn al-Din Khwajajuk (1235–1252)
- Qutb al-Din Muhammad Khan (second reign; 1252–1257)
- Muzaffar al-Din Hajjaj (1257–1267/8) (co-ruler of Kutlugh Turkan)
- Kutlugh Turkan (1257–1282)
- Jalal al-Din Suyurghatmish (1282–1292)
- Safwat al-Din Padishah Khatun (1292–1295)
- Kurdujin Khatun (1295)
- Muzaffar al-Din Mohammad (1295–1304)
  - Yuluk Shah (1295) — in rebellion
  - Suyuk Shah (1301–1302) — in rebellion
- Qutb al-Din Shah Jahan (1304–1306)

== Genealogy of House of Qutluq-Khan ==
House of Qutluq-Khan

Qutluq-Khanids

Qulduz
Baraq r. 1222–1235	Hamid-Pur
Mubarak-Khwaja r. 1235–1252	Muhammad I r. 1235–1235, 1252–1257	Qutluq-Turkhan r. 1257–1282
Kurdujin r. 1295–1295	Suyurghatmysh r. 1282–1292	Hajjaj r. 1257–1267	Padishah r. 1292–1295
Shah-Jahan r. 1304–1306	Muhammad II r. 1295–1304

== See also ==
- Qara Khitai
- Liao dynasty
- Khitan people

== Sources ==
- Minorsky, V. (2012). "Ḳutlug̲h̲-K̲h̲ānids". In P. Bearman; Th. Bianquis; C.E. Bosworth; E. van Donzel; W.P. Heinrichs (eds.). The Encyclopedia of Islam, SECOND. BRILL Online.
- Wing, Patrick (2014). "Mozaffarids". Encyclopaedia Iranica.
