= Rukn al-Din =

Rukn al-Din, Rukn ad-Din or Rukn ud-Din (Arabic: ركن الدين, lit. 'Pillar of the Faith') is a honorific title, now used as a given name. It may refer to:

- Abu Muhammad al-Juwayni (died 1046), renowned Islamic scholar.
- Abu al-Muzaffar Rukn ud-Dīn Barkyāruq bin Malikšāh (died 1105), sultan of Great Seljuq
- Abbas ibn Abi al-Futuh (died 1154), Fatimid vizier
- Rukn al-Dīn Mas'ūd, or Mesud I (died 1156), sultan of the Seljuqs of Rûm
- Rukn ad-Din Suleiman Shah, or Süleymanshah II (1196–1204), Seljuq Sultan of Rûm
- Rukn al-Din Khurshah (died 1256), 27th Imam of the Nizari Isma'ili Shia community
- al-Malik al-Zahir Rukn al-Din Baibars al-Bunduqdari (1223–1277), Mamluk Sultan of Egypt and Syria
- Rukn ud din Firuz (died 1236), Muslim Turkic ruler and Sultan of Delhi
- Rukn al-Dīn Qilij Arslān bin Kaykhusraw, or Kilij Arslan IV (died 1266), Seljuq Sultan of Rûm
- al-Malik al-Muzaffar Rukn al-Din Baibars al-Jashnakir al-Mansuri, or Baibars II (died 1309), Mamluk Sultan of Egypt
- Baybars al-Mansuri (died 1325), Mamluk-era historiographer
- Sheikh Rukn-ud-Din Abul Fath, also known as Rukn-e-Alam (1251–1335), Indian Sufi saint
- Rokneddin Mokhtari (1887–1970), Iranian musician and violinist
- Rukniddin Sharipov (born 1974), Tajik interned in Guantánamo Bay
