= Buraq Hajib =

Founder of Kirmanid dynasty

Ruler of Kirman
- Successor: Qutb al-Din Mohammad
- Born: Qara Khitai (Western Liao)
- Died: 1234; Kerman
- Issue: Rukn al-Din Mubarak Khwaja
- Nasr al-Dunya wa'l-Din Abu'l-Fawaris Qutlugh Sultan Buraq Hajib

Buraq Hajib, also spelt Baraq Hajib (died 1234), was a Khitan who founded the Qutlugh-Khanid dynasty in the southern Persian province of Kirman the early 13th century after the conquest of the sinicised Qara Khitai (Western Liao dynasty) by the Mongol Empire. The dynasty founded by Buraq Hajib ended in the 14th century.

== Origin ==
The Khitans in northern China were known as خطا in Arabic (Khata) and are mentioned by Muslim chroniclers as having fought against Muslims and founded the Qara Khitai (Western Liao dynasty). After the destruction of the Qara Khitai realm by the Mongols under Genghis Khan in 1218, the former land of the Qara Khitai became absorbed into the Mongol Empire. A small part of the population under Buraq Hajib settled in the Persian province of Kirman, converted to Islam, and established a local dynasty there.

== Early years ==
Buraq Hajib is thought to be a member of Qara Khitai dynasty and a son of a Khitan noble Kulduz. Buraq Hajib and his brother Hamīd Pur (or Khan Temür) Tayangu were detained or captured by Muhammad of Khwarezm in 1210, and were given important posts. He was initially in the service of Khwarazm prince Ghiyas-ad-Din Purshah, under whom he was nicknamed Qutlugh Khan. He was soon appointed as the commander of Isfahan for Khwarazmshahs. He arrived at Kerman at first as a commander of Purshah's army, joining him in the battle against Salghurid atabeg Sa'd I. However, he had an argument with Purshah's vizier Tajaddin Karim ash-Sharq and left for India hearing approachment of a Mongol army under command of Tolun Cherbi (step-son of Hoelun). While on his way to India, Buraq was attacked by the local governor of Kirman - Shuja ad-Din Abul-Qasim, but Buraq managed to defeat him thanks to defection of Turks and decided to start a siege of Kirman. He had submit to Jalal ad-Din at first, offering her daughter's hand, who in turn helped him to conquer Kirman. He quickly got involved in local politics, aiding Nasrid emir Ali b. Harb in his struggle to throne in 1225.

== Reign ==
In 1228 Khwarazm prince Ghiyas-ad-Din Purshah sought refuge in Kirman after incurring the wrath of his brother, Sultan Jalal ad-Din. Using favorable situation, Buraq forced him to give his mother's hand, marrying her. After a revelation of conspiracy involving two Khitan nobles and Ghiyas-ad-Din. he and his mother was soon murdered by Buraq. Sometime later Buraq converted to Islam and requested the Abbasid Caliph for investiture and was granted a title of Qutlugh Sultan. His next action was to ally to Atabegs of Yazd through marriage. Buraq later submitted to the Mongol Empire, and he and his successors were conferred the title of Qutlugh Khan, and allowed to ruled as vassal of the Mongols. Throughout its rule the dynasty continued to be known as Qara Khitai. There were a total of 9 rulers of the Kirmanid dynasty, two of whom were female.

He sent his son Rukn al-Din Mubarak Khwaja to Ögedei's court just before his death in 1234/5. He was succeeded by his nephew Qutb al-Din Mohammad.

== Family ==
He had at least two wives - a widow of Muhammad II of Khwarazm and Uka Khatun. His only son was Rukn al-Din Mubarak Khwaja who was born of Uka Khatun. Kutlugh Turkan was probably one of his concubines, although according to Fatema Mernissi she was his daughter Khan Turkan (see below). He had at least 4 daughters:

- A daughter - married to Jalal ad-Din
- Sevinch Khatun - married to Chagatai
- Khan Turkan - married to his nephew Qutb al-Din Mohammad. According to Vladimir Minorsky, her identity was mistaken for Kutlugh Turkan.
- Yaqut Turkan - married to Mahmud Shah (r. 1229-1241), Atabeg of Yazd
- Maryam Turkan - married to Mohyi al-Din, nephew of Sam ibn Wardanruz, Atabeg of Yazd

== See also ==
- Qara Khitai
- Mongol invasion of Central Asia
