= Abaqa Khan =

Mongol ruler of the Ilkhanate from 1265 to 1282

Abaqa Khan ᠠᠪᠠᠭ᠎ᠠ ᠬᠠᠨ
- Ilkhān al-Mu'aẓẓam (Supreme Ilkhan); Sultān-i Īrān (Sultan of Iran)
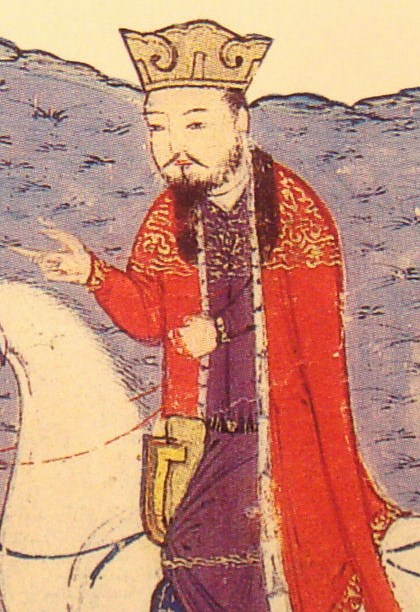
- Abaqa in a 14th century illustration

Ilkhan
- Reign: 8 February 1265 – 1282
- Predecessor: Hulagu Khan
- Successor: Tekuder
- Born: 27 February 1234; Mongolia
- Died: 4 April 1282 (aged 48); Hamadan, Ilkhanate
- Consort: Buluqhan Khatun; Padishah Khatun; Maria Palaiologina; Qaitmish Egeci; Nukdan khatun Bulujin Egachi
- Issue: Arghun; Gaykhatu; Oljath; El Qutlugh Khatun; Malika Khatun; Theodora Ara Qutlugh
- House: Borjigin
- Dynasty: Hulaguid
- Father: Hulagu Khan
- Mother: Yesuncin Khatun
- Religion: Buddhism

Abaqa Khan (27 February 1234 – 4 April 1282, Mongolian: Абаха/Абага хан (Khalkha Cyrillic), ᠠᠪᠠᠭ᠎ᠠ
ᠬᠠᠨ (Traditional script), "paternal uncle", also transliterated Abaġa), was the second Mongol ruler (Ilkhan) of the Ilkhanate. The son of Hulagu Khan and Lady Yesünčin and the grandson of Tolui, he reigned from 1265 to 1282 and was succeeded by his brother Ahmed Tekuder. Much of Abaqa's reign was consumed with civil wars in the Mongol Empire, such as those between the Ilkhanate and the northern khanate of the Golden Horde, and the Chagatai Khanate in Central Asia. Abaqa also engaged in unsuccessful attempts at invading Syria under the Mamluk Sultanate, which included the Second Battle of Homs.

== Life ==
Abaqa was born in Mongolia on 27 February 1234, son of Ilkhanate founder Hulagu Khan. Abaqa was a Buddhist. A favoured son of Hulagu, he was made governor of Turkestan.

Hulagu died from illness in 1265. Before his death, he had been negotiating with the Byzantine Emperor Michael VIII Palaiologos to add a daughter of the Byzantine imperial family to Hulagu's number of wives. Michael VIII had selected his illegitimate daughter Maria Palaiologina, who was dispatched in 1265, escorted by the abbot of Pantokrator monastery, Theodosius de Villehardouin. Historian Steven Runciman relates how she was accompanied by the Patriarch Euthymius of Antioch. Since Hulagu died before she arrived, she was instead married to Hulagu's son, Abaqa. He received her hand in marriage when he was installed as Ilkhan. When Hulagu's wife Doquz Khatun also died in 1265, the role of spiritual leader transferred to Maria, who was called "Despina Khatun" by the Mongols.

It was Abaqa who decided that the permanent location for the Ilkhanate capital would be Tabriz, which was in the northwestern grasslands that the Mongols preferred.

Abaqa took power four months after the death of his father, and then spent the next several months redistributing fiefs and governorships.

Some of the coins from Abaqa's era display the Christian cross, and bear in Arabic the Christian inscription "In the name of the Father, the Son and the Holy Spirit, only one God".

== Military campaigns ==
=== Golden Horde ===
A gold dinar from the early reign of Abaqa, minted in Baghdad in 1268–1269 CE, bearing a Persian inscription on the obverse reading Qāʾān Pādishāh-i Ālam, Īlkhān al-Aʾzam Abāqā, meaning “the Khagan, the Sovereign of the World (referring to Kublai Khan), the Greatest Ilkhan Abaqa.”

A Mongolian decree of Abaqa, issued in 1271 CE at Ahar, addressed to local government officials in the cities and warning them against mistreating and extorting merchants under government protection.

Since Hulagu's reign, the Mongols of the Ilkhanate had been at war with the Mongols of the Golden Horde. This continued into Abaqa's reign, and the Golden Horde invaded the Ilkhanate in the spring after his accession. The invasion was partly due to an alliance between the Golden Horde and the Egyptian Mamluks. As part of this alliance, the Golden Horde attempted to distract Abaqa through attacks on his territories so as to keep him from invading Mamluk-held Syria. The hostilities continued until the death of the Golden Horde's khan, Berke, in 1267. The Great Khan Kublai attempted to intervene to stop the civil war, and due to his influence, the Golden Horde's new khan, Möngke Temür did not launch a major invasion into Abaqa's territory. However, Möngke Temür still commanded Commander Nogai to establish an alliance with the Egyptian Mamluk sultan Baibars promising that he would attack Abaqa and share any conquered territories. But, at the same time, Möngke Temür sent envoys to congratulate Abaqa when the Ilkhan defeated Ghiyas-ud-din Baraq. In 1270, he allowed Mengu-Timur to collect his revenues from workshops in Iran.

=== Chagataids ===
Ögedei's grandson Kaidu, Batu's grandson Mengu-Timur and Baraq of the Chagatai Khanate formed an alliance against Kublai Khan and Abaqa in Talas. They appointed Kaidu a ruler of Central Asia. The resulting Kaidu–Kublai war which started in 1268 would carry on until the end of the century.

In 1270, Baraq Khan of the Chagatai Khanate tried to annex Iran, which resulted in an attack on Abaqa who was in the city of Herat. However, Abaqa was able to launch a successful defence and also defeated Baraq's relative Teguder in Georgia. In the following year, he retaliated by sending an army against the Chagatai Khanate. They plundered Bukhara and surrounding areas. There were small conflicts between Abaqa and the Qara'unas who were under the control of Chagatai nobles until 1280.

=== Invasions of Syria ===
==== Diplomatic relations with Christians ====
Abaqa was one in a long line of Mongol rulers who attempted to secure Western co-operation against the Muslim Mamluks. He corresponded with Pope Clement IV during 1267–1268, and reportedly sent a Mongol ambassador to western Europe in 1268, trying to form a Franco-Mongol alliance between his forces, those of the West, and those of his father-in-law Michael VIII. He received responses from Rome and from James I of Aragon, though it is unclear if this was what led to James' unsuccessful expedition to Acre in 1269. Abaqa is recorded as having written to the Aragonese king, saying that he was going to send his brother, Aghai, to join the Aragonese when they arrived in Cilicia. Abaqa also sent embassies to Edward I of England, and in 1274 sent a Mongol delegation to Pope Gregory X at the Second Council of Lyons, where Abaqa's secretary Rychaldus read a report to the assembly, reminding them of Hulagu's friendliness towards Christians, and assuring them that Abaqa planned to drive the Muslims from Syria. But neither this diplomatic mission, nor two further embassies to Europe in 1276 and 1277, brought any tangible results.

==== Campaign during the Ninth Crusade (1271) ====
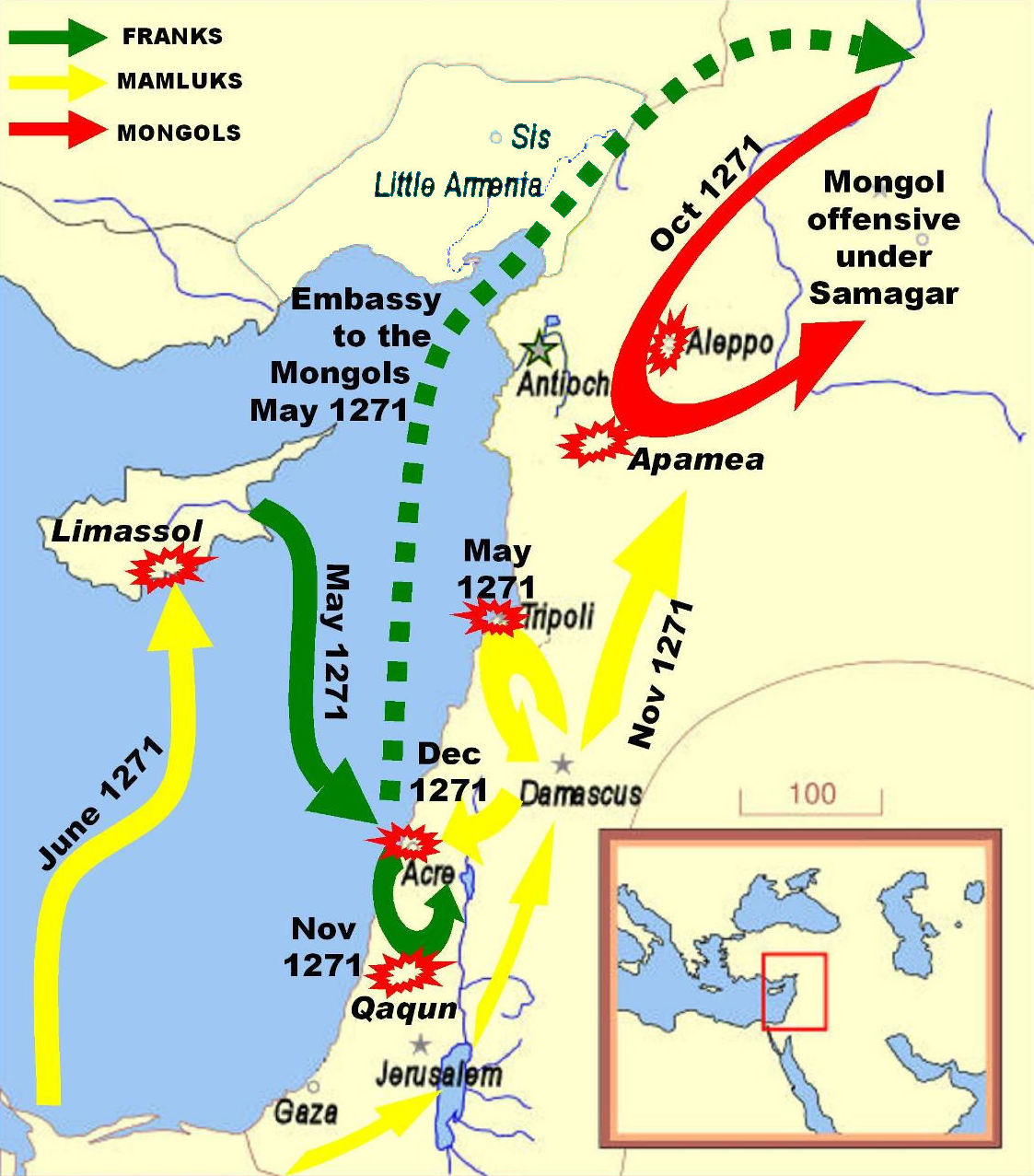
Mongol operations (red) under Abaqa's general Samagar during the Ninth Crusade in 1271

In 1260 Bohemond VI of Antioch was persuaded by his father-in-law, Hetoum I of Armenia, to voluntarily submit to Mongol authority while Abaqa's father Hulagu was in power, making Antioch and Tripoli vassal states of the Ilkhanate. In 1268, the Mamluk leader Baibars captured Antioch, and Bohemond obtained a truce with Baibars in order to avoid losing Tripoli.

In response to the fall of Antioch, Edward I of England arrived in Acre in 1271, trying to lead a new Crusade. It was ultimately considered a military failure, but Edward was able to eventually secure a truce with the Mamluks before he had to return to England.

When Edward arrived in Acre, he had sent an embassy to Abaqa, led by Reginald Rossel, Godefroi of Waus and John of Parker, requesting military assistance from the Mongols. Abaqa was occupied with other conflicts in Turkestan but responded positively to Edward's request, sending 10,000 Mongol horsemen under general Samagar from the occupation army in Seljuk Anatolia to Syria:

"After talking over the matter, we have on our account resolved to send to your aid Cemakar (Samagar) at the head of a mighty force; thus, when you discuss among yourselves the other plans involving the aforementioned Cemakar be sure to make explicit arrangements as to the exact month and day on which you will engage the enemy."

— Letter from Abaqa to Edward I, 4 September 1271.

The Mongols, including some auxiliary Seljuk troops, ravaged the land from Aleppo southward. Though the force was relatively small, they triggered an exodus of the Muslim population (who remembered the previous campaigns of the Mongol general Kitbuqa) as far south as Cairo. Edward, for his part, was never able to muster his own forces to coordinate actions with the Mongols or even achieve any military victories, so Abaqa's forces eventually withdrew. When Baibars mounted a counter-offensive from Egypt on 12 November 1271, the Mongols had already retreated beyond the Euphrates.

==== Campaigns of 1280–1281 ====
The Mamluk leader Baibars died in 1277. During 1280 and 1281, Abaqa promoted new attacks against Syria. In September 1280, the Mongols occupied Baghras and Darbsak, and took Aleppo on October 20. The Mongols sent envoys to Acre to request military support for their campaign, but the Crusaders were still in a 10-year truce with the Mamluks. The Vicar of the Patriarch declined Abaqa's request, saying that the city was suffering from hunger, and that the king of Jerusalem was embroiled in another war. The King of Cyprus Hugh III and Bohemond VII mobilised their armies, but could not intervene because the Mamluks had already positioned themselves between them and the Mongols.

Abaqa and Leo III urged the Franks to start a new Crusade, but only the Hospitallers and Edward I (who could not come for lack of funds) responded favourably. The Hospitallers of Marqab made combined raids into the Buqaia, and won several engagements against the Sultan Qalawun, raiding as far as the Krak des Chevaliers in October 1280, and defeating the Mamluk army of the Krak in February 1281.

The Mongols finally retreated, pledging to come back for the winter of 1281. They informed the Franks that they would bring 50,000 Mongol horsemen and 50,000 Mongol infantry, but apparently this pledge did not receive a response.

==== Campaign of Autumn 1281 ====
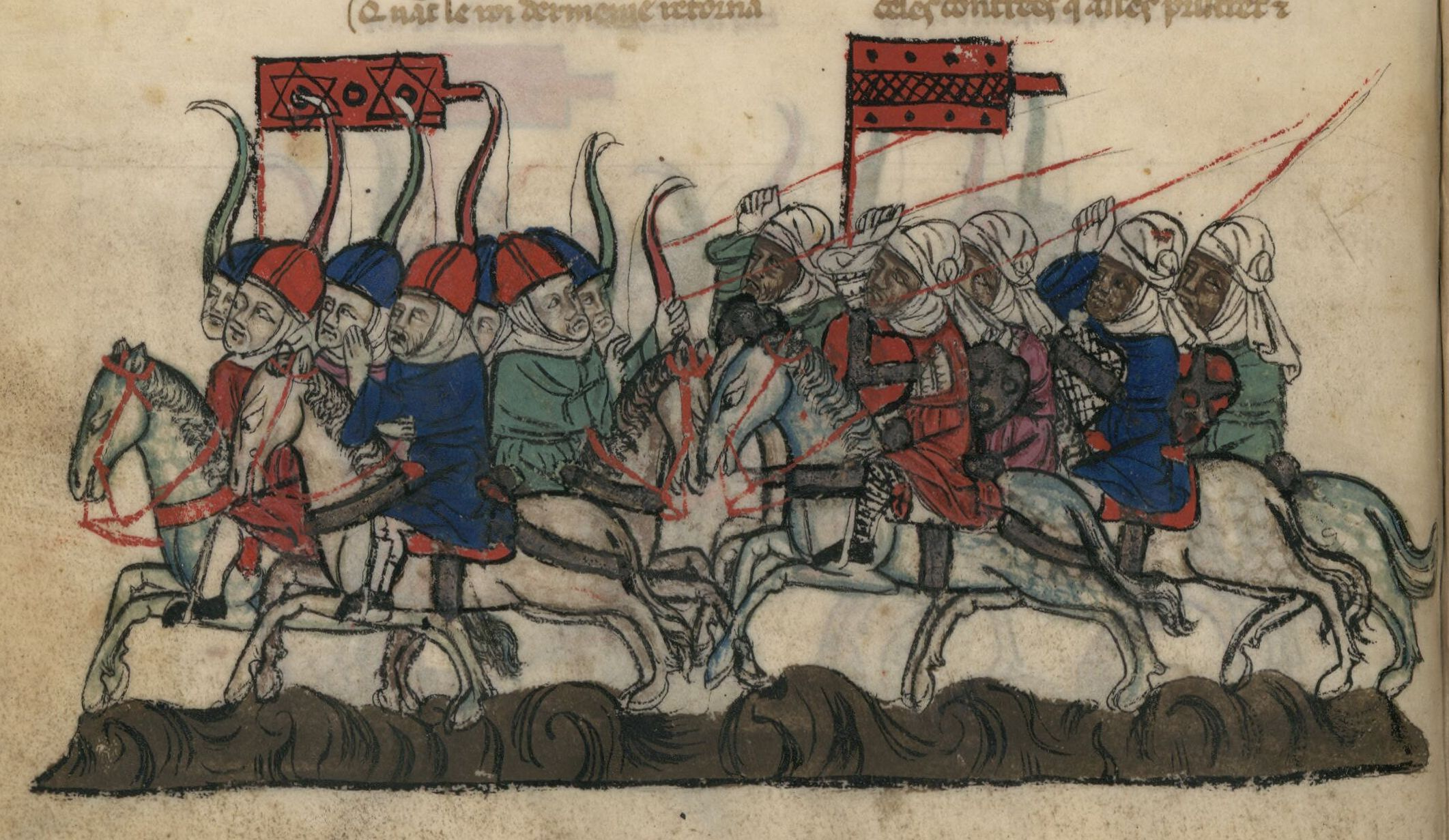
Defeat of the Mongols (left) at the 1281 Battle of Homs.

The Egyptian Muslims had respected a 10-year truce with the Crusaders which began in 1271. On 3 May 1281, the new Muslim sultan Qalawun signed a new 10-year truce with the barons of Acre and a second 10-year truce with Bohemond VII of Tripoli, on 16 July 1281.

The announced Mongol invasion started in September 1281. They were joined by the Armenians under Leo III, and by about 200 Hospitalier knights from the fortress of Marqab who considered they were not bound by the truce with the Mamluks.

On 30 October 1281, 50,000 Mongol troops, together with 30,000 Armenians, Georgians, Greeks and the Frankish Hospitalier Knights of Marqab, fought against the Muslim leader Qalawun at the Second Battle of Homs, but were beaten back.

== Death and succession ==
Abaqa died at Hamadan on 4 April 1282, probably in a state of delirium tremens. This illness was probably caused by too much consumption of alcohol, a habit common to many Mongol leaders. However, in 1285, his minister of finance Shams ad-Din Juvayni was accused of having had him poisoned.

After Abaqa's death, his widow Maria fled back to Constantinople where her father, apparently wishing to spare his capital the fate that befell Baghdad, tried to marry her off again to another Mongol khan. Maria would not accept the offer, became a nun, and in about 1285 founded the church of Panagia Mouchliotissa.

Abaqa was succeeded by his brother Tekuder, who despite his earlier conflicts with the Egyptian Mamluks, had converted to Islam. Tekuder reversed Abaqa's pro-Christian policies and proposed an alliance with the Mamluk Sultan Qalawun, who resumed attacks on Frankish territory, capturing the northern fortress of Margat in 1285, Lattakia in 1287, and Tripoli in 1289. In 1284, Abaqa's son Arghun led a successful revolt, backed by Kublai. Arghun had his uncle Tekuder executed and took power himself, returning to the pro-Christian policies of Abaqa.

A younger son, Gaykhatu, assumed the throne in 1291.

== Family ==
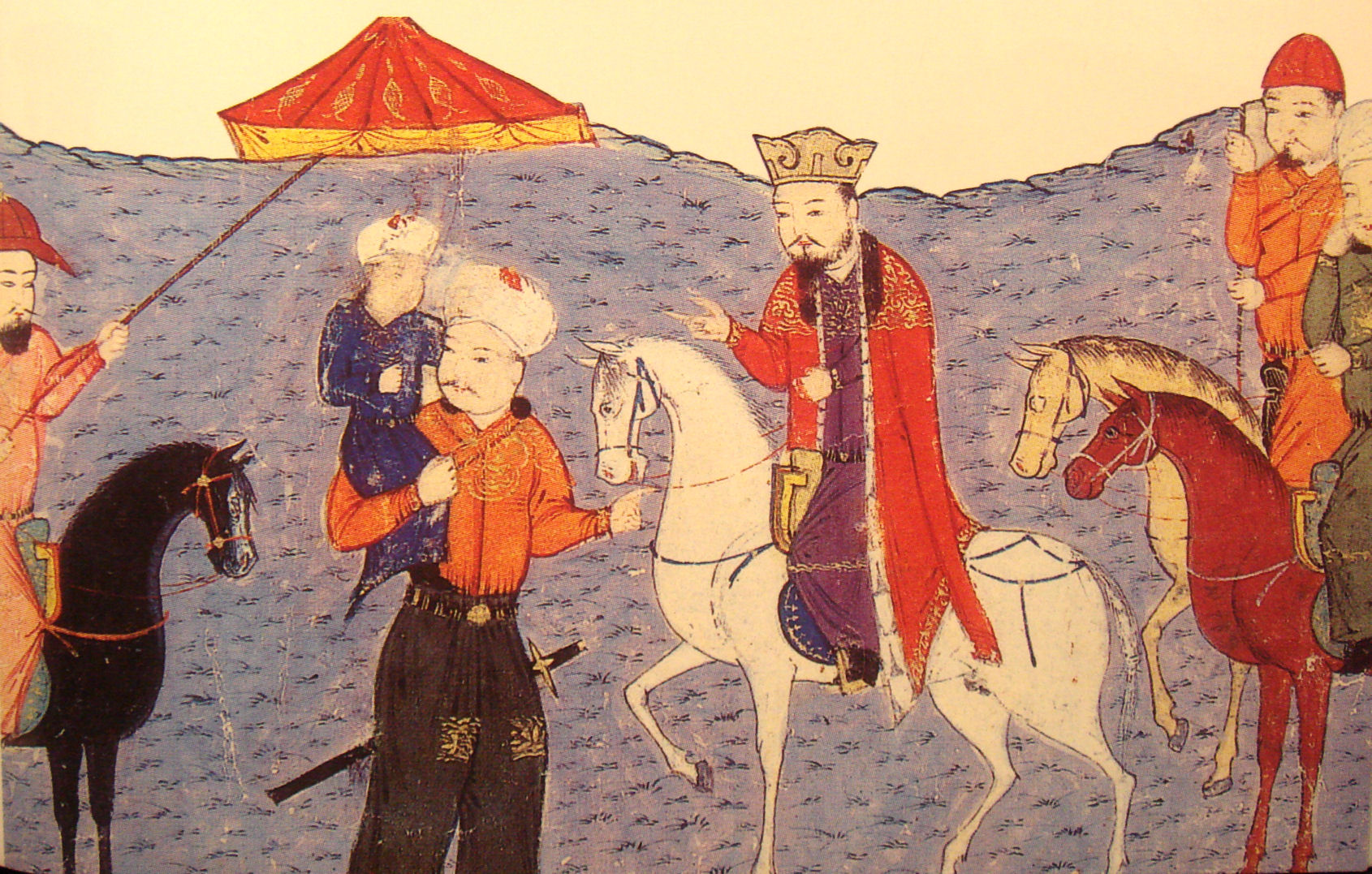
Abaqa on a horse. His son Arghun stands beside him under a royal umbrella, with his own son, Mahmud Ghazan, in his arms. Rashid-al-Din Hamadani, early 14th century.

Abaqa had sixteen consorts and children with several of them:

Inherited from Hulagu:

1. Öljei Khatun, mother of Möngke Temür
2. Tuqtani (or Toqiyatai) (d. 20 February 1292) — former concubine, raised to be a khatun, was given Dokuz Khatun's encampment

Principal wives:

1. Dorji Khatun
2. Nukdan Khatun — from Tatar tribe; replaced Dorji after her death
  - Gaykhatu
3. Eltuzmish Khatun — daughter of Qutlugh Timur Güregen of Khonggirad, sister of Taraghai Güregen; replaced Nukdan after her death
4. Padishah Khatun — daughter of Qutb-ud-din Muhammad, ruler of Kirman and Kutlugh Turkan; was given Yesunchin Khatun's (d. January/February 1272) encampment
5. Mertei Khatun — sister of Taghai Timur (renamed Musa) of Khongirad (son of Shigu Güregen, son of Alchi Noyan; and Tümelün Bekhi, daughter of Genghis Khan and Borte)
  - Buchin Khatun
6. Todai Khatun — a lady from Khongirad, who afterwards married Tekuder and after him Arghun
  - Yul Qutlugh Khatun — married firstly to Eljidei Qushchi, married secondly to Emir Elbasmish
  - Taghai Khatun — married firstly to Ahmad, brother of Qunchuqbal, married secondly to Doladi Idachi;
7. Despina Khatun — daughter of Michael VIII Palaiologos
  - Theodora Ara Qutlugh (Byzantine Greek: Θεοδώρα Ἀραχαντλούν)
8. Buluqhan Khatun (died 20 April 1286) — a lady from the Bayaut tribe
  - Malika Khatun — married to Toghan, son of Nogai Yarghuchi of Bayaut

Concubines:

1. Bulughachin Aghachi
2. Qaitmish Egachi — a lady from the Öngüd tribe
  - Arghun
3. Bulujin Egachi
  - Oljath Khatun — married firstly to Vakhtang II of Georgia, married secondly to David VIII of Georgia
  - El Qutlugh Khatun — married to Ghurbatai Güregen of the Hushin tribe
4. Shirin Egachi
5. Altai Egachi
6. Kawkabi Egachi
  - Toghanchuq Khatun (died 1291) — married to Nawruz, son of Arghun Aqa

== Notes ==
Regnal titles
Preceded by Hulagu	Ilkhan; 8 February 1265–1282	Succeeded by Tekuder
