= Religion in the Mongol Empire =

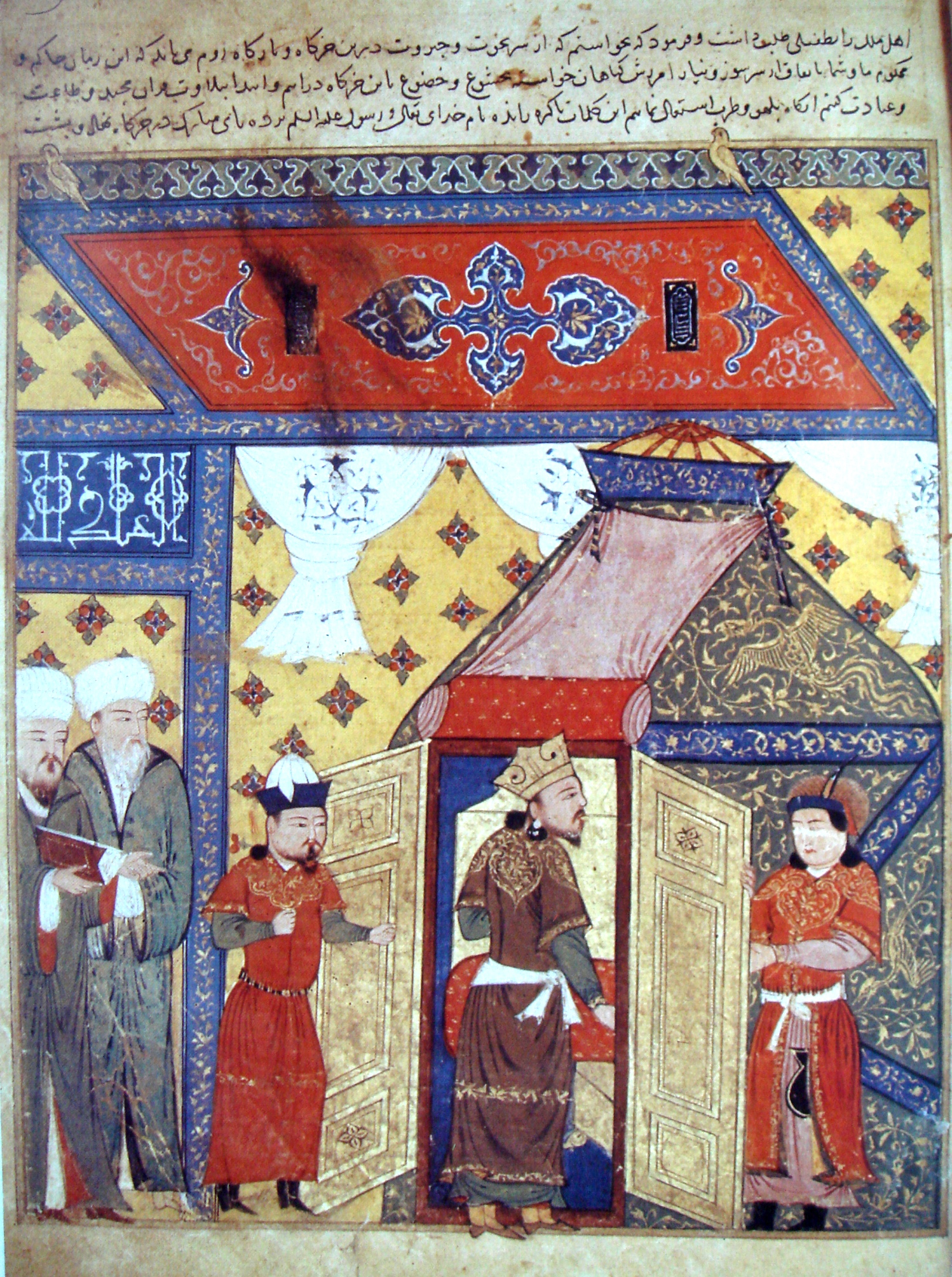
Persian miniature showing Ghazan's conversion from Buddhism to Islam

The Mongols were tolerant of most religions during the early empire, and typically sponsored several at the same time. At the time of Genghis Khan in the 13th century, virtually every religion had found converts, from Buddhism to Eastern Christianity and Manichaeanism to Islam. To avoid strife, Genghis Khan set up an institution that ensured complete religious freedom, though he himself was a Tengrist. Under his administration, all religious leaders were exempt from taxation, and from public service. Mongol emperors were known for organizing competitions of religious debates among clerics, and these would draw large audiences.

Genghis Khan's decree exempting Buddhists (toyin), Christians (erke'üd), Taoists (xiansheng) and Muslims (dashmad) from tax duties were continued by his successors until the end of the Yuan dynasty in 1368. According to Atwood, all the decrees use the same formula and stated that Genghis Khan first gave the decree of exemption. A well preserved example is found in Kublai Khan's 1261 decree in Mongolian appointing the elder of the Shaolin Monastery. (Note: Genghis Khan's tax exemption decree for religions reads: "Činggis qan-u jrlg-tur toyid erkegü:d šingšingü:d dašmad aliba alba gubčiri ülü üjen tngri-yi jalbariju bidan-a irüge:r ögün atugai keme:gsen jrlg-un yosuga:r... ene Šaolim janglau-da bariju yabuga:i jrlg ögbei" (According to the decree of Genghis Khan which says may the Buddhists, Christians, Taoists and Muslims be exempt from all taxation and may they pray to God and continue offering us blessings... I have given this decree to the Shaolin elder to carry it.)) In the Mongol Empire, Buddhist, Christian, Confucian, Daoist, and Muslim priests, monks and scholars (later Jewish clergy) were initially exempted from all kinds of taxes and forced labor. However, in 1264 Khublai imposed only commercial and land taxes to the clergy engaged in trade and agriculture in China, and in 1342 Jani Beg temporarily levied a tax on the Orthodox Christian Church in Russia for a short period before restoring the Church's tax exempt status in 1347.

According to Juvaini, Genghis Khan allowed religious freedom to Muslims during his conquest of Khwarezmia "permitting the recitation of the takbir and the azan". However, Rashid-al-Din states there were occasions when Genghis Khan forbade Halal butchering. Kublai Khan revived the decree in 1280 after Muslims refused to eat at a banquet. He forbade Halal butchering and circumcision. The decree of Kublai Khan was revoked after a decade. Genghis Khan met Wahid-ud-Din in Afghanistan in 1221 and asked him if the Islamic prophet Muhammad predicted a Mongol conqueror. He was initially pleased with Wahid-ud-Din but then dismissed him from his service, as he rebuked Genghis Khan's large scale massacres, saying "I used to consider you a wise and prudent man, but from this speech of yours, it has become evident to me that you do not possess complete understanding and that your comprehension is but small".

Initially, there were few normal places of worship, because of the nomadic lifestyle. However, under Genghis's successor Ögedei, several building projects were undertaken in the Mongol capital of Karakorum. Along with palaces, Ögedei built houses of worship for the Buddhist, Muslim, Christian, and Taoist followers. The dominant religions at that time were Tengrism and Buddhism, although Ögedei's wife was a Christian. In later years of the empire, three of the four principal khanates embraced Islam, as Islam was favored over other religions. The Yuan dynasty mainly adopted Tibetan Buddhism while there were other religions practiced in the east of the Mongol Empire.

== Tengrism ==
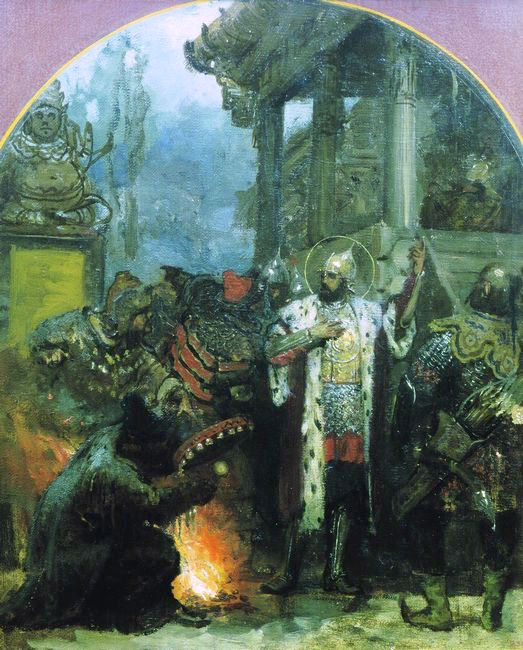
Alexander Nevsky standing near a Mongolian shaman in the Golden Horde. Painting by Henryk Siemiradzki.

Tengrism, which practices a form of animism with several meanings and with different characters, was a popular religion in ancient Central Asia and Siberia. The central act in the relationship between human and nature was the worship of the Blue Mighty Eternal Heaven - "Blue Sky" (Хөх тэнгэр, Эрхэт мөнх тэнгэр). Genghis Khan showed his spiritual power was greater than others and himself to be a connector to heaven after the execution of rival shaman Kokochu.

The Mongols' shamanistic beliefs prioritized the present life over the afterlife. Therefore, Mongol rulers sought religious men to pray for the longevity.

== State religions ==
=== Buddhism ===
According to the Fozu Lidai Tongzai written by Nian Chang (b. 1282) Genghis Khan's viceroy Muqali was pacifying Shanxi in 1219, the homeland of Zen Buddhist monk Haiyun (海雲, 1203–1257), when one of Muqali's Chinese generals, impressed with Haiyun and his master Zhongguan's demeanor, recommended them to Muqali. Muqali then reported on the two to Genghis Khan who issued the following decree on their behalf: "They truly are men who pray to Heaven. I should like to support them with clothes and food and make them chiefs. I'm planning on gathering many of this kind of people. While praying to Heaven, they should not have difficulties imposed on them. To forbid any mistreatment, they will be authorized to act as darqan (possessor of immunity)." Genghis Khan had already met Haiyun in 1214 and been impressed by his reply refusing to grow his hair in the Mongol hairstyle and allowed him to keep his head shaven. After the death of his master Zhongguan in 1220, Haiyun became the head of the Chan (Chinese Zen) school during Genghis Khan's rule and was repeatedly recognized as the chief monk in Chinese Buddhism by subsequent Khans until 1257 when he was succeeded as chief monk by another Chan master Xueting Fuyu the Mongol-appointed abbot of Shaolin monastery.

Buddhists entered the service of the Mongol Empire in the early 13th century. Buddhist monasteries established in the Karakorum were granted tax-exempt status, though the religion was not given official status by the Mongols until later. All variants of Buddhism, such as Chinese, Tibetan and Indian Buddhism flourished, though Tibetan Buddhism was eventually favored at the imperial level under emperor Möngke, who appointed Namo from Kashmir as chief of all Buddhist monks.

Ogedei's son and Guyuk's younger brother, Khotan, became the governor of Ningxia and Gansu. He launched a military campaign into Tibet under the command of Generals Lichi and Door ha, and the marauding Mongols burned down Tibetan monuments such as the Reting monastery and the Gyal temple in 1240. Prince Kötön was convinced that no power in the world exceeded the might of the Mongols. However, he also believed that religion was necessary for the interests of the next life. Thus he invited Sakya Pandita to his ordo. Prince Kötön was impressed and healed by Sakya Pandita's teachings and knowledge, and later became the first known Buddhist prince of the Mongol Empire.

Kublai Khan, the founder of Yuan dynasty, also favored Buddhism. As early as the 1240s, he made contacts with a Chan Buddhist monk Haiyun, who became his Buddhist adviser. Kublai's second son, whom he later officially designated as his successor in the Yuan dynasty, was given a Chinese name "Zhenjin" (literally, "True Gold") by Haiyan. Khatun Chibi influenced Kublai to be converted to Buddhism, as she had received the Hévajra tantra initiations from Phagpa and been impressed. Kublai appointed Phagspa his Imperial Preceptor (initially "State Preceptor"), giving him power over all the Buddhist monks within the territory of the Yuan dynasty. For the rest of the Yuan dynasty in Mongolia and China, until the Mongols were overthrown in 1368, Tibetan lamas were the most influential Buddhist clergy. Via the Tibetan clergy, Indian Buddhist textual tradition strongly influenced the religious life in the Empire.

Some of the Ilkhans in Iran held Pagano grub-pa order as their appanage in Tibet and lavishly patronized a variety of Indian, Tibetan and Chinese Buddhist monks. But in 1295, Ghazan persecuted Buddhists and destroyed their temples. Before his conversion to Islam though, he had built a Buddhist temple in Khorasan. The 14th-century Buddhist scriptures found at archaeological sites related to Chagatai Khanate show the popularity of Buddhism among the Mongols and the Uighurs. Tokhta of Golden Horde also encouraged lamas to settle in Russia But his policy was halted by his successor Ozbeg Khan, a Muslim.

=== Taoism ===
Genghis Khan summoned and met the Taoist master Qiu Chuji (1148–1227) in Afghanistan in 1222. He thanked Qiu Chuji for accepting his invitation and asked if Qiu Chuji had brought the medicine of immortality with him. Qiu Chuji said there was no such thing as a medicine of immortality but that life can be extended through abstinence. Genghis Khan appreciated his honest reply and asked Qiu Chuji who it is that calls him eternal heavenly man, he himself or others. After Qiu Chuji replied that others call him by that name Genghis Khan decreed that from thenceforth Qiu Chuji should be called "Immortal" and appointed him master of all monks in China, noting that heaven had sent Qiu Chuji to him. Qiu Chuji died in Beijing the same year as Genghis Khan and his shrine became the White Cloud Temple. Following Khans continued appointing Taoist masters of the Quanzhen School at White Cloud Temple. The Taoists lost their privilege in 1258 after the Great Debate organized by Genghis Khan's grandson Möngke Khan when Chinese Buddhists (led by the Mongol-appointed abbot or shaolim zhanglao of Shaolin monastery), Confucians, and Tibetan Buddhists allied against the Taoists. Kublai Khan was appointed to preside over this debate (in Shangdu/Xanadu, the third meeting after two debates in Karakorum in 1255 and 1256) in which 700 dignitaries were present. Kublai Khan had already met Haiyun in 1242 and been swayed towards Buddhism.

=== Christianity ===
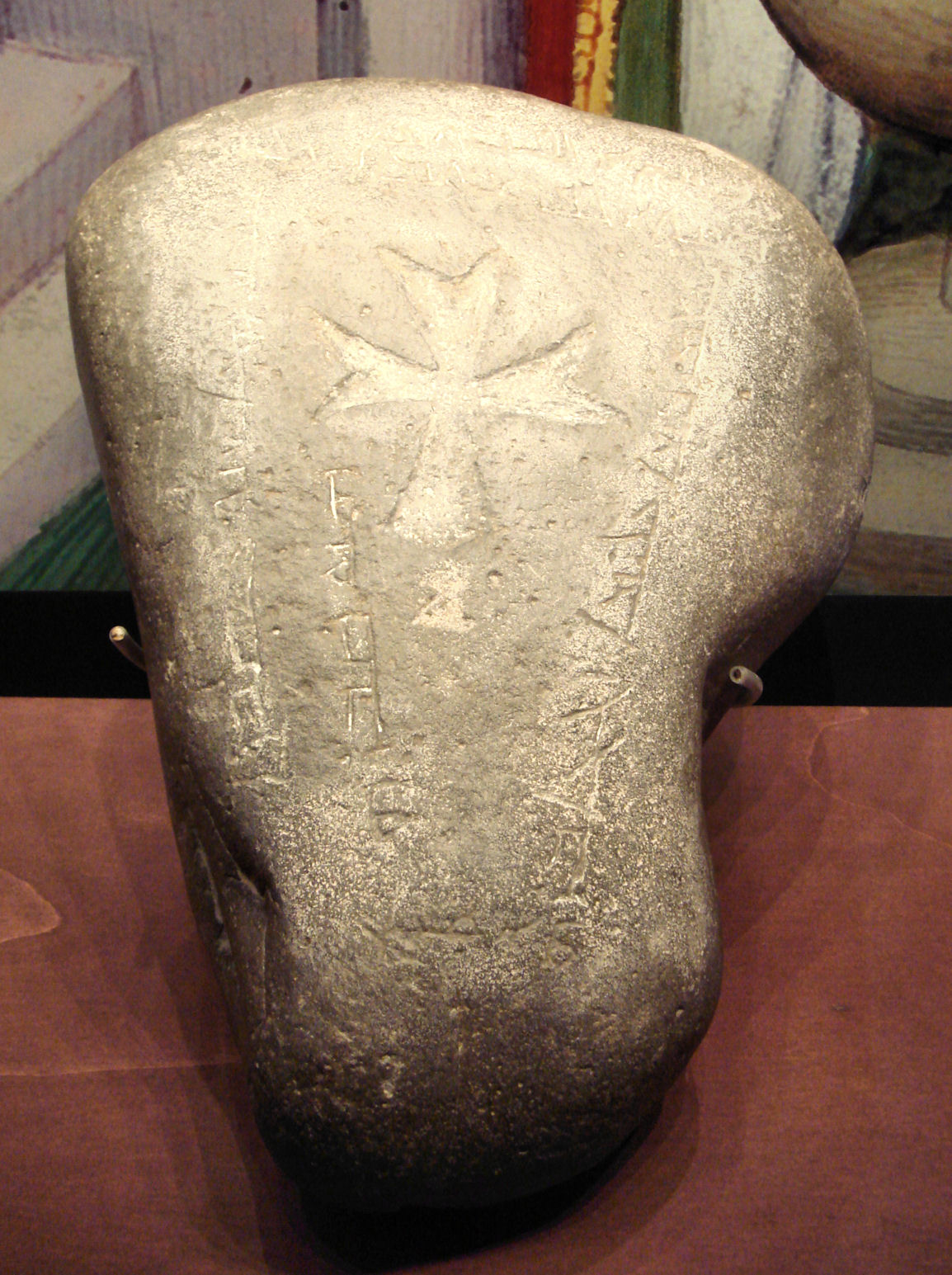
Nestorian tombstone found in Issyk Kul, dated 1312.

Some Mongols had been evangelized by Christian Nestorians since about the 7th century, and a few Mongols were converted to Catholicism, especially by John of Montecorvino who was appointed by the Papal states of Europe.

The religion never achieved a great position in the Mongol Empire, but many Great Khans and lesser leaders were raised by Christian mothers and educated by Christian tutors. Some of the major Christian figures among the Mongols were: Sorghaghtani Beki, daughter in law of Genghis Khan, and mother of the Great Khans Möngke, Kublai, Hulagu and Ariq Boke; Sartaq, khan of Golden Horde; Doquz Khatun, the mother of the ruler Abaqa; Nayan, a descendant of one of Genghis Khan's brothers, who raised a rebellion against Kublai in Manchuria; Kitbuqa, general of Mongol forces in the Levant, who fought in alliance with Christians. Marital alliances with Western powers also occurred, as in the 1265 marriage of Maria Palaiologina, daughter of Emperor Michael VIII Palaeologus, with Abaqa. Tokhta, Oljeitu and Ozbeg had Greek Khatun as well. The Mongol Empire contained the lands of the Eastern Orthodox Church in Caucasus and Russia, the Armenian Apostolic Church in Armenia and the Assyrian Church of Nestorians in Central Asia and Persia.

The 13th century saw attempts at a Franco-Mongol alliance with the exchange of ambassadors and even military collaboration with European Christians in the Holy Land. Ilkhan Abacha sent a tumen to support crusaders during the Ninth Crusade in 1271. The Nestorian Mongol Rabban Bar Sauma visited some European courts in 1287–1288. At the same time, however, Islam began to take firm root amongst the Mongols, as those who embraced Christianity such as Tekuder, became Muslim. After Ongud Mar Yahbh-Allaha, the monk of Kublai Khan, was elected a catholicos of the eastern Christian church in 1281, Catholic missionaries were begun to be sent to all Mongol capitals.

=== Islam ===
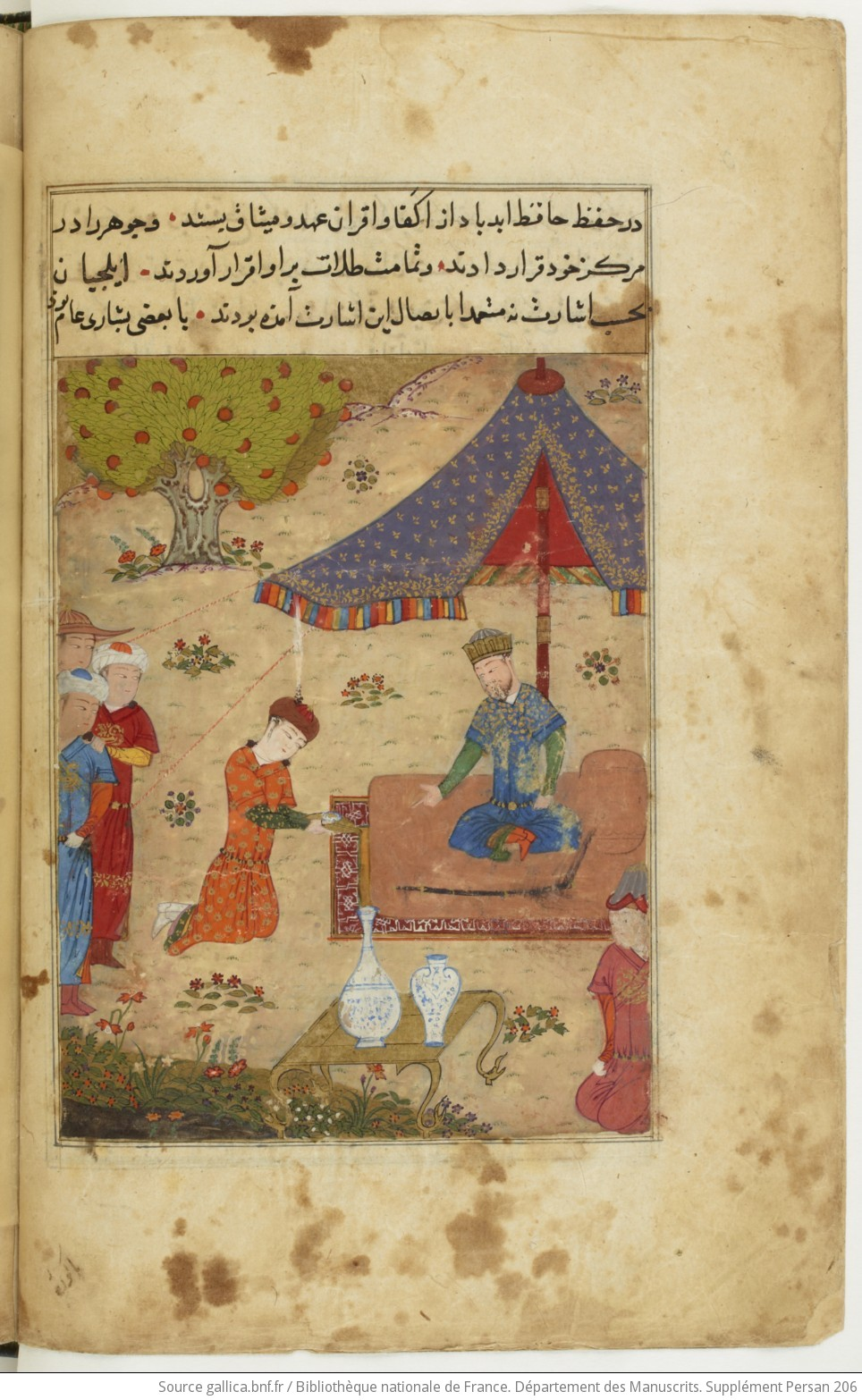
Image of Tekuder who was a Christian convert to Islam.

The Ilkhanate, Golden Horde, and the Chagatai Khanate (with Buddhism and Tengrism) – three of the four principal khanates (except for the Yuan dynasty) – embraced Islam, as the Mongol elite favored Islam to strengthen their rule over the Muslim majority populace. Non-Muslim Mongols also employed many Muslims in various fields and increasingly took their advice in administrative affairs. For example, Genghis Khan's advisor, Mahmud Yalavach, and Kublai Khan's financial minister, Ahmad Fanakati, were Muslims. Still, the mainlands of the Mongols remained staunchly Buddhist and Shamans.

As they were well educated and knew Turkic and Mongolian, Muslims became a favored class of officials with notable Mongol converts to Islam including Mubarak Shah and Tarmashirin of the Chagatai Khanate, Tuda Mengu and Negudar of the Golden Horde, Ghazan and Öljaitü of the Ilkhanate. Berke, who ruled Golden Horde from 1257 to 1266, was the first Muslim leader of any Mongol khanates. The first Il-khan to embrace Islam was Mahmud Ghazan in 1295. This was a shift in the Ilkhanate's religious identity. Prior to Ghazan's reign, the Il-khans been decidedly non-Muslim. The Ilkhanate's founder, Hulegu Khan, was infamous among Muslims for his 1258 sack of Baghdad. Berke Khan of the Golden Horde - a devout convert to Islam - waged a war to chastise Hulegu for the sack of Baghdad, aligning with the Mamluk Sultanate to do so. The Berke-Hulegu War was one major conflict within the wider context of division and infighting, which ultimately solidified the fragmentation of the Mongol Empire. During his reign over Muslim-majority Persia, Hulegu patronised Islamic institutions and intellectuals, but - as had been Genghis Khan's policy - he tended to favour promoting religious minorities to positions of rulership. In particular, he favoured the Keraite clan - a Christian Mongol clan, which had been the clan of his mother and of his favourite wife. However, he also promoted the Jalayrid clan to positions of leadership. The Jalayrids were an Islamised Mongol clan, whom the Il-Khans appointed to positions of rulership over their Persian Muslim co-religionists, eventually ruling over an independent sultanate of their own. Among the most prominent political families of the Ilkhanate (both before and after Ghazan's conversion to Islam) was the Juvayni family - a Persian Muslim family, who had held prominent religious and civil service positions during the Abbasid and Khwarezmian eras. Shams al-Din Juvayni served as vizier to Hulegu and three other Il-khans before his execution in 1284.

Ghazan continued his non-Muslim forefathers' approach toward religious tolerance. When Ghazan learned that some Buddhist monks feigned conversion to Islam due to the earlier destruction of some of their temples, he granted permission to all who wished to return to Tibet where they could freely follow their faith and be among other Buddhists.

Though in Chagatai Khanate, Buddhism and Shamanism flourished until the 1350s. When the western part of the khanate embraced Islam quickly, the eastern part or Moghulistan slowed Islamization until Tughlugh Timur (1329/30–1363) who accepted Islam with his thousands of subjects.

The Yuan dynasty, unlike the western khanates, never converted to Islam. The other two Khanates accepted the suzerainty of Yuan dynasty but gradually that withered away. There had been many Muslims residing in Yuan dynasty territory since Kublai Khan and his successors were tolerant of other religions. Nevertheless, Buddhism was the most influential religion within its territory. Contact between Yuan emperors in China and states in North Africa, India, and the Middle East lasted until the mid-14th century. Foreigners like Uyghur Buddhists from Cochon, Nestorian Christian Keraits, Naimans, On guns, Jews, and Central Asian Muslims were classified as Semuren, "various sorts", below the Mongols but above the Chinese.

At the same time the Mongols imported Central Asian Muslims to serve as administrators in China, the Mongols also sent Han Chinese and Khitans from China to serve as administrators over the Muslim population in Bukhara in Central Asia, using foreigners to curtail the power of the local peoples of both lands.

Genghis Khan and the following Yuan Emperors forbade Islamic practices like Halal butchering, forcing Mongol methods of butchering animals on Muslims, and other restrictive degrees continued. Muslims had to slaughter sheep in secret. Genghis Khan directly called Muslims and Jews "slaves", and demanded that they follow the Mongol method of eating rather than the halal method. Circumcision was also forbidden. Jews were also affected, and forbidden by the Mongols to eat Kosher.

Among all the [subject] alien peoples only the Hui-hui say “we do not eat Mongol food”. [Cinggis Qa’an replied:] “By the aid of heaven we have pacified you; you are our slaves. Yet you do not eat our food or drink. How can this be right?” He thereupon made them eat. “If you slaughter sheep, you will be considered guilty of a crime.” He issued a regulation to that effect ... [In 1279/1280 under Qubilai] all the Muslims say: “if someone else slaughters [the animal] we do not eat”. Because the poor people are upset by this, from now on, Musselman [Muslim] Huihui and Zhuhai [Jewish] Huihui, no matter who kills [the animal] will eat [it] and must cease slaughtering sheep themselves, and cease the rite of circumcision.

The Muslims in the same class also revolted against the Yuan dynasty in the Ispah Rebellion but the rebellion was crushed and the Muslims were massacred by the Yuan loyalist commander Chen Youding. Some Muslim communities had the name in Chinese which meant "barracks" and also mean "thanks", many Hui Muslims claim it is because that they played an important role in overthrowing the Mongols and it was named in thanks by the Han Chinese for assisting them.

During the Ming conquest of Yunnan, Generals Mu Ying and Lan Yu, led Muslim troops loyal to the Ming dynasty against Mongol and Muslim troops loyal to the Yuan dynasty.

== Religion under Genghis Khan ==
As Genghis Khan united the Mongol tribes and waged war on most of Asia he became known as one of the most ruthless and brutal warlords of all time. However, one hallmark during his military conquest was his tolerance of all religions. He embraced diversity and decreed religious freedom for everyone. Genghis Khan’s tolerance proved to be beneficial for him. Genghis continued to use religious persecution to his benefit. He would use suppressed people as spies in cities such as Baghdad and then take the land, assimilating all those willing. In Amy Chua's book Day of Empire, she claims that "... the Mongols were more religiously open than any other power in the world."

=== Genghis Khan's Inner Circle ===
After a failed assassination attempt on Genghis Khan, 100 of his men fled and nearly starved to death. While on the run these men swore allegiance to one another and remarkably these men included Buddhists, Christians, Muslims, and animists who worshiped the Eternal Blue Sky and the God Mountain of Burkhan Khaldun.

=== Defender of Religions ===
When Muslim envoys came from Central Asia to seek Genghis Khan's protection from the religious persecution they faced under their Christian khan Kuchlug, Genghis Khan was eager to help. He led a campaign into Balasagun and killed Kuchlug and declared religious freedom in his lands. This earned Genghis Khan the title as "defender of religions" and it was even said he was "one of the mercies of the Lord and one of the bounties of his divine grace".

== Outside perspective ==
The Mongols' passion for religious tolerance appealed to writers of the eighteenth century. "The Catholic inquisitors of Europe", wrote Edward Gibbon in a celebrated passage, "who defended nonsense by cruelty, might have been confounded by the example of a barbarian, who anticipated the lessons of philosophy and established by his laws a system of pure theism and perfect toleration." He goes on to add, in a footnote, "a singular conformity may be found between the religious laws of Zingis Khan and of Mr. Locke".

== See also ==
- Religion in Mongolia
- Turco-Mongol tradition
- Nomadic empire
- Mongol invasions and conquests
- Early Muslim conquests
