= Qurumushi =

Viceroy in the Mongol Empire

Viceroy of Georgia
- In office 12 March 1289 – July 1318
- Appointed by: Arghun
- Preceded by: Alinaq
- Succeeded by: Taz

Personal details
- Died: July 1319 Soltaniyeh
- Parent: Alinaq

Qurumushi or Qurmushi was an Ilkhanate commander of Keraite origin who served as Mongol viceroy of Georgia.

== Early life ==
He was from Tongqayit clan of Keraite tribe who migrated from Mongolia accompanying Hulagu's army. His grandfather Tügür was Hulagu's scribe, member of keshig and a commander, while his great-grandfather Quyidu served Genghis Khan and Ong Khan. His father Alinaq served Ahmad Tekuder as his commander-in-chief and was also his son-in-law. He had two brothers as well.

Qurumushi was a member of the force tasked by Tekuder with severing the connection between princes Arghun and Qonqurtay in 1284. He served as a messenger to Tekuder's father on 1 May 1284 when Tekuder asked Alinaq to prepare for fight against pro-Arghun forces. However, the latter prevailed and Alinaq was executed on 4 July 1284 by Arghun.

== Under Arghun ==
After his father's execution, Qurumushi inherited Alinaq's domains in modern Javakheti, his mingghan and his wife Kuchuk Khatun in levirate. He was tasked by Arghun with overseeing Vakhtang II after Demetrius II's execution in 1289.

== Under Ghazan ==
Qurumushi changed sides frequently over rapid successions of Gaykhatu, Baydu and Ghazan and ended up choosing the victorious side. Qurumushi captured Baydu in Nakhchivan, 1295 after pursuing him with a 4,000-strong army. After the battle, a rebellious pro-Baydu emir Tuqal fled to David VIII of Georgia in 1295. The campaign came to an end when Beka I Jaqeli captured Tuqal and handed him over to Qurumushi.

Ghazan continued purging of rival princes and emirs later on and sent Qurumushi and Chupan against another Borjigid prince, Arslan who was captured by Ghazan previously and pardoned, revolted in Bilasuvar in 1296. After a series of battles near Baylaqan he too was captured and executed, along with the rebellious emirs on 29 March.

Around 1299 Ghazan became suspicious of the reports that David VIII and Toqta Khan of Golden Horde were preparing for an alliance. As a result, Ghazan ordered David VIII to arrive to his capital Tabriz. David refused to comply and Ghazan Khan responded with a punitive expedition under Qurumushi, Alinji and Shahinshah. Supported by the Mongols, Ossetes attacked Shida Kartli province and occupied the Liakhvi River gorge. David entrenched himself in the Mtiuleti mountains while Qurumushi installed George V as his successor.

Qurumushi was among the leading emirs in Mamluk-Ilkhanid War. He fought in Battle of Wadi al-Khaznadar as the commander of the 3rd contingent in right, after Ghazan himself, Elbasmish and Chichak noyans.

== Revolt ==
After Qutluqshah's death in Gilan, 1307, Chupan suddenly rose to be supreme commander of Ilkhanate forces and later de facto ruler of Ilkhanate during Abu Sa'id's reign. Abu Sa'id kept him in Georgia as viceroy. However, Abu Sa'id caught off-guard when both Öz Beg Khan and Yasa'ur invaded Ilkhanate in Golden Horde-Chagatai alliance, 1319. Chupan summoned his subordinate emirs, including Qurumshi and caught up to Abu Sa'id and defeated the Ozbeg on the shores of Kura river. Chupan decided to punish the emirs who didn't came to the summoning. Qurumushi himself was sentenced to 100 blows by Chupan, which was insulting to him.

It was when Qurumushi started to conspire a revolt. When Abu Sa'id left for his capital Qurumushi attacked his camp led by Toqmaq noyan, forced him to change sides. Chupan himself fled to his son Hasan, who aided him with 500 men. Chupan's forces were crushed by Qurumushi's 20,000 men near Lake Sevan, Chupan himself got away wounded. Later Safavid authors claimed this was due to 'miraculous intercession' of Safi al-Din Safawi. Qurumushi captured Nakhchivan after the battle and started an alliance with fellow Kerait emir Irinjin. Apart being both Keraites, Qurumushi and Irinjin were both related to ilkhan Tekuder by marriage. Irinjin was already disgruntled by Chupan's dismissal of him from Anatolian viceroyalty, therefore he gladly agreed.

While Abu Sa'id was gathering his forces in Soltaniyeh, Qurumshi and Irinjin besieged Tabriz, forcing its inhabitants to pay 70,000 dinars and give them provisions. Rebels later captured Sarab, Miyaneh and Zanjan. Abu Sa'id's army were commanded by Taz, son of Kitbuqa and Mamluk renegade Qara Sonqur. The sides fought a battle on 13 July 1319 in which Irinjin and Qurumushi were beaten. Qurumushi fled but captured by Khaja Badr al-Din Lu'lu' near the river Kur and sent to Soltaniyeh. The Georgian king George V of Georgia supported the Il-Khanate in helping crush Qurumshi's revolt.

== Trial and death ==
During trial Qurumushi said that the rebellion was in fact against Chupan and was authorized by Abu Sa'id himself who sent him two envoys - Yusuf Böke and Harza Muhammad of Suldus. Envoys confirmed Qurumushi's testimony but the ilkhan denied and ordered Chupan to execute them. Irinjin in his defence showed a yarligh given to him by the ilkhan, authorizing him to act against Chupan; a document with Abu Sa'id denied again. Qurumushi was executed on seventh day of executions with nails stuck into him and shot in the chest with arrows. His body was later burned. Viceroyalty of Georgia was given to Taz, son of Kitbuqa.

== Family ==
He had at least two wives:

- Kuchuk Khatun, daughter of Tekuder
- Qutlugh Malik Khatun (d. 1338), daughter of Gaykhatu

He had at least two sons, who fled to Golden Horde after their father's defeat. One of them, Abd al-Rahman became tümen commander under Oz Beg Khan. However, al-Wassaf states they were apprehended by Sutay and killed as well.
