= Qutui Khatun =

13th-century Mongol princess and wife of Il-Khan Hulagu

Qutui Khatun (Mongolian: Кутуй Хатун, Persian: قوتی or قوتوی) was a Mongol princess and one of the wives of Il-Khan Hulagu, founder of Ilkhanate. Their son, Tekuder, briefly served as Il-Khan from 1282 until 1284. Khatun had an important role in state affairs during Tekuder's reign, and she was known as a protector of East Syriac Christians.

== Biography ==
Qutui Khatun was the daughter of Chigu of the Khongirad tribe and Tümelün bekhi, a daughter of Genghis Khan. She was a Church of the East Christian and an open supporter of Christianity. In 1279, she went to Maragha to support Christians in restoring the ritual of water blessing during Epiphany, which had been stopped due to rivalry with the Muslims.

Hulagu Khan married Qutui Khatun after the death of Güyük Khatun. When Hulagu departed for Iran in 1253, he took two of his four wives with him: Öljei Khatun and Doquz Khatun. Khatun and Yesunjin stayed with his brother Möngke Khan, the ruler of the Mongol Empire. Khatun arrived in Iran around 1268, as a member of the second wave of Hulagu's relatives who arrived after the Mongol invasion of Iran, but her husband died during her journey in 1265. She was informed of his death while in Badakhshan (present-day Tajikistan) by Hulagu's son and successor Abaqa Khan. On arrival, they were greeted by Abaqa Khan. Since she had outlived her husband, according to Mongol custom, Khatun later married Abaqa Khan.

After Abaqa Khan died in 1282, two political factions clashed over the succession, with each faction being led by one of Hulagu's wives supporting their son's claim to the throne. The faction that supported Möngke Temür was led by Öljei Khatun, and the faction that supported Tekuder was headed by Khatun. Other members of the royal family supported Tekuder. The decisive moment in the conflict was Möngke Temür's death, which secured Tekuder's claim, and he was eventually enthroned on 6 May 1282. Tekuder was a Muslim, deeply involved with Sufi sheikhs, and upon being enthroned, he took the name Ahmed. He proclaimed himself the protector of Islam. This action eroded the legitimacy of Sultan Al-Mansur Qalawun of the Mamluk Sultanate, with whom he unsuccessfully tried to make peace during the Mongol invasions of the Levant. Tekuder did not spend much time on state affairs. The fiscal responsibilities of the state were taken care of by his mother and Asiq, the amir of her orda. Khatun also received foreign diplomats and participated in creating foreign strategy towards the Mamluk Sultanate. Tekuder waited to decide state affairs only after consulting with his mother, who had a final say. Khatun promoted a policy of rapprochement with the Muslims.

Tekuder became unpopular among the Mongol elites, the so-called "Old-Mongol" party of East Syriac Christians and Buddhists, who now favoured his nephew Arghun, Abaqa's son. They protested to Kublai Khan, who threatened that he would intervene. Tekuder blamed the Church of the East for the appeals to Kublai Kahn and threw its Patriarch Yahballaha III into prison, planning to execute him. His life was saved by the intercession of Khatun. Arghun gained crucial support from Qonqurtai, who had originally supported Tekuder, and from the party that supported the late Mengu-Timur and his mother Öljei Khatun. Tekuder replaced Qonqurtai with Alinaq and ordered the arrest of both Qonqurtai and Arghun. Arghun armies were defeated at Aq-Khoja near Qazvin on 4 May 1284, and Arghun surrendered. While Tekuder waited for his mother's decision on the matter, Arghun was held prisoner by Alinaq. A palace revolution broke out after members of the military conspired against Tekuder, and Arghun was released on 4 July. Tekuder was deserted by his troops and killed on 10 August. Arghun was enthroned the next day. Qutui Khatun started organising support against the usurper, but Qara'unas attacked and plundered their orda, which was under Arghun's command.
