= Yahballaha III =

Church of the East patriarch (c.1245–1317)

Mar Yahballaha III
- Catholicos-Patriarch of the Church of the East
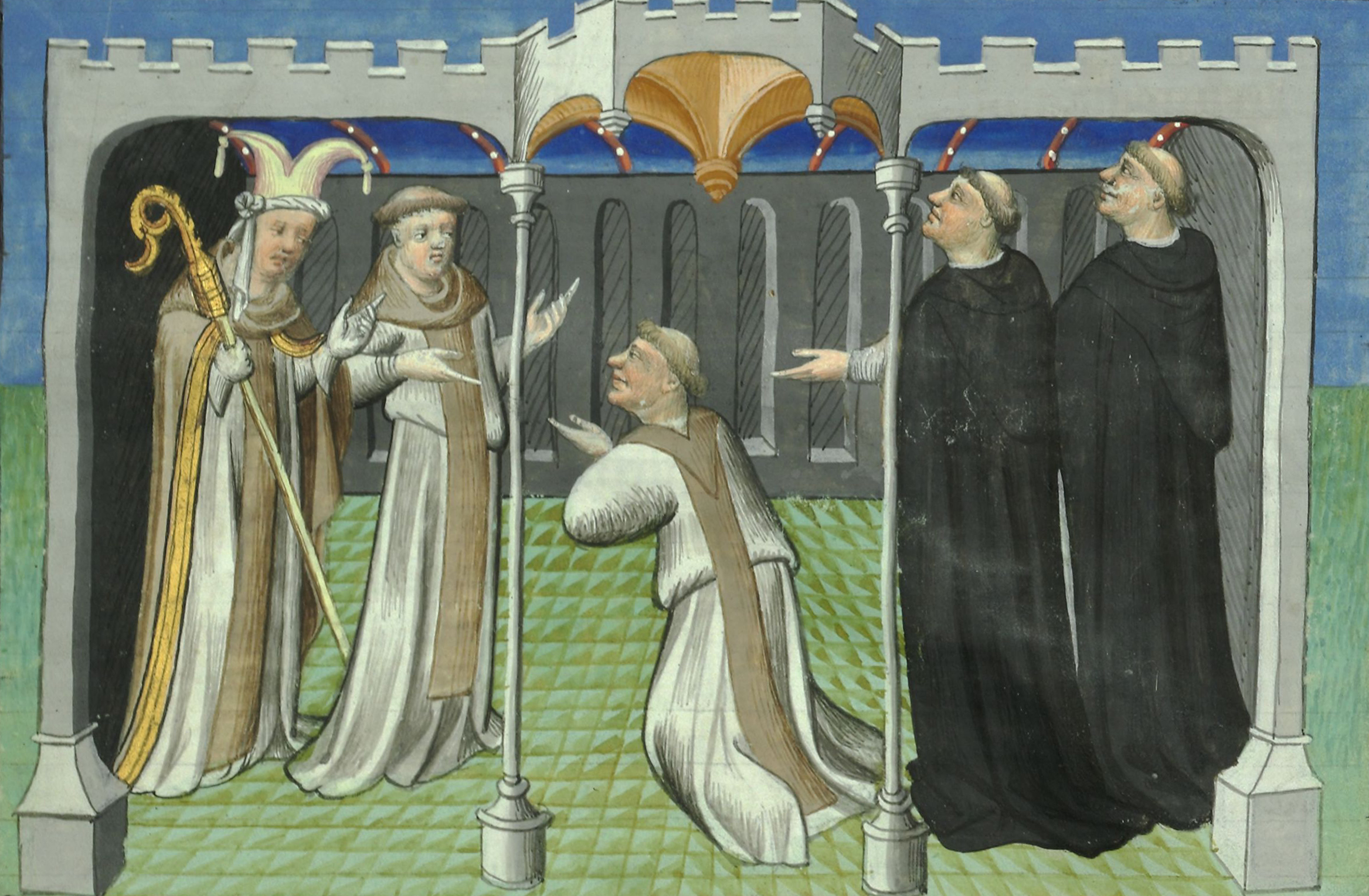
- A 15th-century miniature depicting Riccoldo da Monte di Croce in the audience before Yahballaha III
- Church: Church of the East
- See: Seleucia-Ctesiphon
- Elected: November 1281
- Installed: 21 November 1281
- Term ended: 13 November 1317
- Predecessor: Denha I
- Successor: Timothy II
- Other post: Metropolitan of Katai and Ong

Orders
- Consecration: 1279 by Denha I

Personal details
- Born: Markos c. 1245 Koshang, Ongud
- Died: 13 November 1317 Maragheh, Ilkhanate
- Denomination: Church of the East
- Residence: Maragheh, Ilkhanate

Yahballaha III (c. 1245–13 November 1317), known in earlier years as Rabban Marcos (or Markos) was Patriarch of the East from 1281 to 1317. As patriarch, Yahballaha headed the Church of the East during the severe persecutions under the reign of khans Ghazan and his successor Öljaitü. He acknowledged the primacy of the Pope and tried to form a church union, which was rejected by the traditionalist bishops of the Church of the East.

Yahballaha's life is the subject of the History of Mar Yahballaha and Rabban Sauma. A native of Koshang, Marcos travelled with Rabban Bar Sauma, an ascetic Nestorian monk from Mongol-controlled China to Jerusalem. However, they were prevented from reaching their final destination due to the war between the Mongols and Mamluks. Patriarch Denha I of the Church of the East recalled them and consecrated Markos as the bishop of Katay and Ong, Mar Yahballaha. However, both opted to remain in monasteries in Mosul.

Yahballaha's election as the new patriarch of the Church of the East was approved by Abaqa Khan for political reasons and consecrated in 1281 as Yahballaha III. In 1282, Abaqa Khan's brother Tekuder, a convert to Islam, succeeded the throne. The Old Mongol party of Buddhists and Nestorian Christians opposed Tekuder, who started persecuting the Church of the East for siding with the Old Mongol party. Yahballaha was imprisoned, but his life was saved by Tekuder's Christian mother Qutui Khatun. In 1284, Abaqa Khan's son Arghun became the khan, and he held both Yahballaha and Bar Sauma in high esteem. Arghun sought an alliance with Christian Europe against the Muslims in Syria and Egypt and, advised by Yahballaha, sent Bar Sauma for the first East Asian diplomatic mission to Europe in history. After the fall of Acre to Muslims in 1291, the popular opinion in the Ilkhanate started to incline towards Islam. The relations between the Church of the East and the khan remained well during the rule of Gaykhatu, Arghun's successor. However, with Arghun's son Ghazan ascendance to the throne, Muslims gained dominance. Ghazan started the persecution of Christians, and Yahballaha was again imprisoned. He was ransomed by Hethum II of Armenia.

In 1289, Yahballaha allowed the Dominican friar Riccoldo da Monte di Croce to preach among the Nestorians and renounced their heterodoxies. He sought a church union with the Catholic Church in Rome. He started negotiations in 1302 by writing to Pope Boniface VIII and Pope Benedict XI in 1304, professing the Catholic faith in the latter letter and acknowledging the pope's primacy over all of Christendom. However, the union was rejected by the Nestorian bishops. In 1304, Öljaitü succeeded Ghazan and renewed the persecutions against Christians, which Yahballaha unsuccessfully tried to end. Yahballaha died in Maragheh in 1317.

== Early life ==
Markos was born in the city of Koshang (near modern Dongsheng District, Inner Mongolia) the capital of the Turkic Ongud tribe. His ethnic ancestry is not entirely clear. According to the contemporary source Story of Mar Yahballaha and Rabban Sauma he was an "Oriental Turk". Bar Hebraeus in his Chronography referred to him as "Uyghur, that is Turk". The Arabic Chronicle of the Nestorian Patriarch calls him "a Turk by birth from the region of Katay (i.e. Northern China)". The two lists of the patriarch of the Church of the East refer to him as "a Turk", and a Latin bull calls him "an Oriental Turk". Pier Giorgio Borbone suggests that Yahballaha probably belonged to the Ongud tribe and dismisses Bar Hebraeus' claim about his Uyghur descent since Uyghurs at the time lived in a distant region around Turfan.

As a child, he became a pupil of Rabban Bar Sauma, a Nestorian monk. At first, they probably lived in the Monastery of the Cross in the present-day Fangshan District of western Beijing. In 1275/76, Markos and Bar Sauma started a journey towards Jerusalem. At the beginning of their travel, Markos was around thirty and Bar Sauma was forty-eight. They first went to Khanbaliq, Bar Sauma's birthplace, to gather more people for the journey. Then they went to Koshang, Tangut, Hotan and Kashgar. After staying in Hotan for six months and finding Kashgar empty as its population fled the "enemy", Bar Sauma and Markos went to Taraz (north of Tien Shan) in present-day Kazakhstan to pay homage to Kaidu Khan and ask for safe passage through his land, which he allowed. The two travelers probably passed through Samarkand and Bukhara, arriving in the region of Khorosan in the town of Tus, now a village near Mashhad in present-day Iran. In Maragheh in the region of Azerbaijan they met with Patriarch Denha I. From Erbil, they went to Mosul and visited Nisibis and various Nestorian monasteries along the Tigris river.

Their plan to visit Jerusalem was prevented because of the war between the Mongols and Mamluks, who at the time bordered each other along the Euphrates river. They still tried to reach Palestine, travelling through Armenia and Georgia and then by sea. However, they were recalled by the Patriarch, who wanted to give them leadership over the church in China. The Patriarch named Markos the bishop of Katay and Ong (Northern China and the Ongud tribe, respectively), giving him the name Mar Yahballaha. At the same time, he named Bar Sauma sa'ora (visiting bishop) for the Eastern countries, and general vicar. The new titles meant that the two would return to the East; however, both insisted on staying to live in a monastery, deeming themselves unworthy of the new titles. They remained in a monastery near Mosul for two years.

== Patriarchate ==
After the death of Patriarch Denha I, the Nestorian bishops chose Yahballaha as his successor in November 1281, with approval from Abaqa Khan, the Mongol ruler of the Ilkhanate. The reasons for his election were political, as Yahballaha was familiar with Mongol customs, politics, and language because of his origin. His knowledge of Syriac was scarce, and he did not speak Arabic at all. In the presence of other Nestorian bishops, Yahballaha was consecrated in Kokhe church on 21 November 1281 as Yahballaha III. He received the seal given to the patriarch before him by Möngke Khan.

Abaqa died in 1282 and was succeeded by his brother Tekuder, a convert to Islam. Tekuder became unpopular among the Mongol elites, the so-called "Old-Mongol" party of Nestorian Christians and Buddhists, who now favoured his nephew Arghun, Abaqa's son. They protested to Kublai Khan, who threatened to intervene. Tekuder blamed the Church of the East for the appeals to Kublai Kahn and imprisoned Yahballaha III. His life was saved by Tekuder's mother Qutui Khatun, who was a Christian. Tekuder was succeeded by his nephew Arghun in 1284. Both Yahballaha and Bar Sauma were held in high esteem by both Abaqa and Arghun.

After succeeding Tekuder, Arghun sought an alliance with the European rulers against the Muslims in Syria and Egypt. He wrote to Pope Honorius IV that Kublai Khan commissioned him to liberate the "land of the Christians". he consulted with Yahballaha about who should head the embassy to Europe; Yahballaha proposed Bar Sauma, which Arghun accepted. In 1287, Bar Sauma arrived in Trabzon at the south shore of Black Sea. In June, he went to Constantinople, where he met with Emperor Andronikos of Byzantium, and then to the Kingdom of Naples, where he met with Charles II. In Rome, he learned about the death of Pope Honorius IV and was greeted by the College of Cardinals instead. However, they could not respond to Arghun's request until the new pope's election. Bar Sauma went to Florence and Genoa, where he met with the Captain of the People. From Genoa, Bar Sauma went to Lombardy and onwards to Paris, where he met Philip IV of France. After staying for a month in Paris, Bar Sauma met with the English king Edward in Bordeaux. Both English and French kings expressed their interest in the alliance. Before returning to Rome, Bar Sauma spent the winter in Genoa and met Pope Nicholas IV after his election. The Pope issued a bull recognising Yahballaha as the "patriarch of all the Christians of the East" Bar Sauma returned to Ilkhanate in the summer of 1288.

Dominican Friar Riccoldo da Monte di Croce travelled to the East in 1289 and remained there for ten years. Da Monte di Croce found that the Nestorians emphasised rituals more than dogma. He writes that they had a liberal conception of marriage, with divorces and remarriages allowed at will. Nestorians occasionally practised circumcision, even for women, and did not recognise the practice of anointing of the sick. They also abstained from meat. Yahballaha renounced these heterodoxies and allowed da Monte di Croce to preach in Baghdad in 1290. The Nestorian elite wanted to enter the union with Rome, primarily for political reasons.

The Mongols saw the fall of Acre to Muslims in 1291 as a victory of Islam over Christianity and started to incline towards Islam afterwards. However, relations remained good between the Church of the East and the new khan Gaykhatu, who succeeded Arghun that year. By his death in 1295, the popular opinion in the Ilkhanate favoured Muslims. Another son of Arghun, Ghazan, became khan in 1295. He brought Muslims to dominance and started persecuting Christians and destroying churches. He imprisoned Yahballaha and hung him upside down. Yahballaha's life was saved by Hethum II, who paid a ransom to free him from prison, and in 1296 Yahballaha returned to his seat in Maragheh. The next year, his residence was pillaged and destroyed by Muslims, so he moved to Erbil in Iraq. Hethum persuaded Ghazan to end the persecution in 1296. He also issued countermeasures to compensate the Christians. Yahballaha returned to the monastery in Maragheh, whose reconstruction was supported by Ghazan, who in 1303 visited the monastery. However, sporadic persecution continued elsewhere. Nevertheless, Yahballaha enjoyed Ghazan's support until the end of his reign.

We believe in the holy Roman chief pontiff and universal father of all believers in Christ, and confess that he is the successor of the blessed Peter, universal vicar of Jesus Christ over all the sons of the church from east and west; love and affection for whom is fixed in our hearts; and we owe obedience to him, and ask and implore his blessing, and are ready for all his commands, humbly asking and imploring his help in our necessity and tribulations in which we have now been for a long time and remain. And may the good father not turn away his face from us since we are all brothers in Christ and his sons through the true catholic faith.

— Yahballaha's letter to Pope Benedict XI

In 1302, Yahballaha started negotiations with the Roman Curia regarding the union, and sent a letter to Pope Boniface VIII. On 18 May 1304, Yahballaha wrote to Pope Benedict XI making a profession of Catholic faith, accepting the Pope, and acknowledging his primacy over all of Christiandom. However, the Nestorian bishops rejected the union.

During the reign of the khan Öljaitü, who succeeded Ghazan in 1304, the persecution of Christians continued. Although personally on good terms with Yahballaha, he was unwilling or unable to end the persecutions and even carried them out himself, with the persecution in 1306 being remembered as the fiercest. An outbreak of violence occurred in Erbil in 1310, with many Christians being killed and Yahballaha, who was there at the time, barely survived. Yahballaha tried to prevent the massacre of Christians who hid at the Citadel of Erbil, but when the Muslims conquered the citadel on 1 July 1310, they were all massacred. Öljaitü did nothing to prevent the violence. Yahballaha, discouraged by the failure, retired to Maragheh. He died there on 13 November 1317.

== Notes ==
Church of the East titles
Preceded by Denha I (1265–1281)	Catholicos-Patriarch of the East (1281–1317)	Succeeded by Timothy II (1318–c.1332)
