= Qonqurtai =

Viceroy of Anatolia
- Reign: 1277 - 1282; 12 July 1282 - 18 January 1284
- Born: Mongolia
- Died: 18 January 1284; Karabakh, Ilkhanate
- Dynasty: Borjigin
- Father: Hulagu Khan
- Mother: Ajuja

Qonqurtai (Persian: قونقورتاى) was a Mongol prince and viceroy of Anatolia for the Ilkhanate khanate.

== Life ==
Qonqurtai was born to Hulagu Khan and Ajuja Aguchi, his Khitan concubine wife. Qonqurtai was Hulagu's ninth son and was the senior commander during the reign of his brother Abaqa. He was twice appointed as viceroy of Anatolia, first during the reign of Abaqa and then under Tekuder. His winter quarters were in Kazova plains near Tokat, while his viceroyalty itself has centred around Kayseri.

== Rule in Anatolia ==
Qonqurtai was appointed as commander of Ilkhanid army in Anatolia with Shams al-Din Juvayni as his vizier after the Battle of Elbistan in 1277 to support the Sultanate of Rum against revolting Turcomans. He pursued Jimri, a claimant to Seljuk throne, and attacked his patrons - the Karamanids. As a consequence, Mehmet I of Karaman was captured and executed together with his sons Mahmud and Karaman in October 1277. Qonqurtai further authorised Sâhib Ata to act on his behalf. He aided Kaykhusraw III's efforts to subdue Karamanids and Eshrefids in 1282. However, Qonqurtai had to cease his activities upon hearing the death of Abaqa.

Upon the death of Abaqa, Qonqurtai supported Tekuder's succession in Maragha, who in return gave him the hand of Toqiyatai Khatun, a Keraite concubine of Hulagu and niece of Dokuz Khatun on 12 July 1282. He was also re-appointed as viceroy of Anatolia the same day. However, later in Tekuder's reign, he shifted his alliance to Arghun, which made the former suspicious. Qonqurtai was summoned to Karabakh, accused of conspiracy and was arrested by Tegüder's son-in-law, Alinaq - the viceroy of Georgia on 17 January 1284, and was executed next day by breaking his neck. Later, Arghun had put Tekuder on trial for Qonqurtai's death, who suffered the same penalty as him.

== Personality ==
He was described as a wise ruler in Zafarnamah by Hamdullah Mustawfi, while Qalawun considered him as a not only dishonorable, but also a cruel man.

== Family ==
He was married to Toqiyatai Khatun (d. 1292), a Keraite concubine of Hulagu and niece of Dokuz Khatun on 12 July 1282, and only two of his children reached adulthood.:

1. Esen Timur Kharbanda (executed by Ghazan in 1296)
  1. Pulad
2. Ildar (executed by Ghazan in 1296)
  1. Aq Timur
3. Karai (died in infancy)
4. Changtimur (died in infancy)
5. Tashtimur (died in infancy)
6. Ashightimur (died in infancy)
7. Akash m (died in infancy)
