= Alinaq Noyan =

Ilkhanid commander (died 1289)

Alinaq

Viceroy of Georgia
- Succeeded by: Qurumushi

Personal details
- Died: 1289

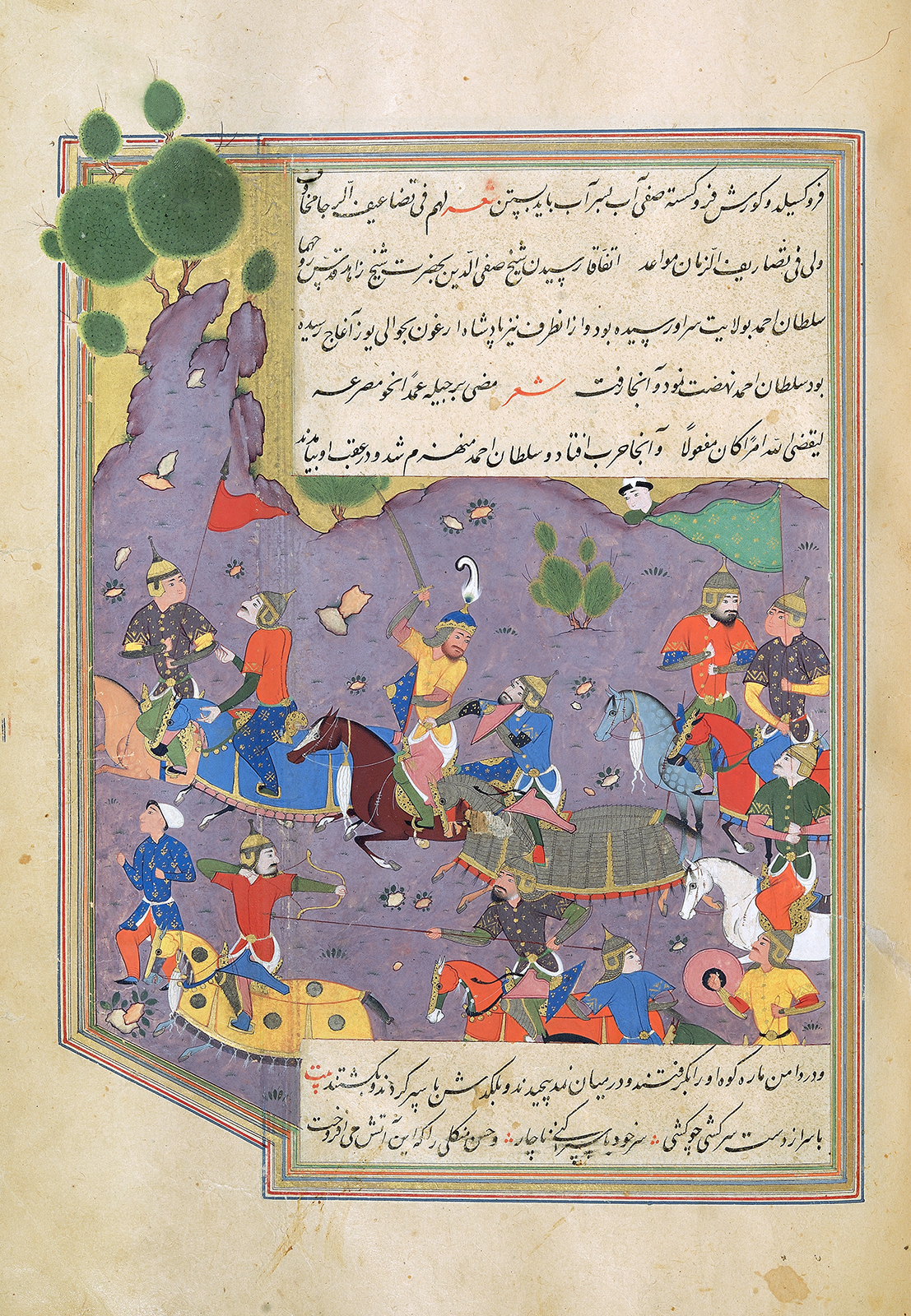
"The war of two Il-Khanid rulers, Arghun Khan vs. Sultan Ahmad" (Tekuder). Folio from a revised, Safavid-era edition of the Safvat al-safa ("The Quintessence of Purity"), Shiraz, Iran, dated September 1582

Alinaq Noyan (died 1289) was a commander of the Il-Khanate and a Commander of Georgia. He was the son-in-law of the Il-Khanid ruler Tekuder. He may have been a son of Tügür Bitigchi, a commander of Hulegu.

Alinaq led a military campaign on his behalf against Tekuder's rival Arghun. Arghun left for Khorasan in the spring to gain the allegiance of minor nobles and emirs. Tekuder on the other hand began to be suspicious of his half-brother Qonqurtai and Arghun's potential alliance. Qonqurtai was accused of conspiracy and was arrested by Tekuder's son-in-law, Alinaq Noyan - the viceroy of Georgia - on 17 January 1284, and was executed the next day. An army contingent was sent to Jazira, from where Gaykhatu and Baydu fled to Khorasan, to Arghun's encampment while several emirs such as Taghachar and Doladai were arrested.

Tekuder's next step was to send Alinaq with 15,000 men against Arghun, while he himself followed Alinaq on 26 April with his main army composed of Armenians and Georgians in addition to Mongols stationed in Mughan plain near Bilasuvar. Arghun prevailed against Alinaq in battle on 4 May, south of Qazvin, but nevertheless retreated to his lands in Khorasan. Ala ud-Daula Simnani, future Sufi saint of Kubrawiya order also fought in Arghun's army during this battle. Arghun tried negotiate a truce, which Ahmad, against the advice of his councillors, refused. Another embassy sent by Arghun, this time led by his son Ghazan arrived at Tekuder's camp near Semnan on 31 May. The embassy was a success, as Ahmad accepted a truce on the condition that Arghun send his brother Gaykhatu as a hostage. Arghun agreed to the terms and sent his brother accompanied by two emirs, including Nawruz into the custody of Buqa, then the most senior of Tekuder's commanders, on 13 or 28 June. Buqa in turn handed him over to Ahmad who put Gaykhatu in Tödai Khatun's encampment.

Despite this, Tekuder continued hostilities and continued to advance on Arghun. This caused Buqa to harbour resentment towards Tekuder and to grow more sympathetic to Arghun. On the other hand, he lost the favour of Tekuder who started to invest his trust in Aq Buqa, another Jalair general.

Arghun's next step was to seek refuge in Kalat-e Naderi, a strong fortress on 7 July with 100 men. But he was forced to surrender to Alinaq four days later. Victorious, Tekuder left Arghun in Alinaq's custody while he himself left for Kalpush, where his main army was stationed. This was the opportunity Buqa was seeking - he broke into Alinaq's camp and set Arghun free, while killing Alinaq. Tekuder fled west and looted Buqa's encampment near Sultaniya in revenge. He continued on to his own pasturelands near Takht-i Suleyman on 17 July, planning to escape to the Golden Horde via Derbent. However, Qaraunas, who had been sent by Buqa, soon caught up with and arrested Tekuder. He was turned over to Arghun on 26 July on the Ab-i Shur pasturelands, near Maragha.

Alinaq was succeeded in this position by his son Qurumushi.

== Sources ==
Hope, Michael (22 September 2016). Power, Politics, and Tradition in the Mongol Empire and the Īlkhānate of Iran. Oxford University Press. p. 132. ISBN 978-0-19-108107-1. "Alinaq Noyan, the commander of Georgia"
