= Denha I =

Patriarch of the Church of the East (r. 1265–1281)

Mar Denha I
- Patriarch of the Church of the East
- Church: Church of the East
- See: Seleucia-Ctesiphon
- Installed: 1265
- Term ended: 1281
- Predecessor: Makkikha II
- Successor: Yahballaha III

Personal details
- Born: 13th century
- Died: 1281
- Residence: Baghdad, Urmia, Maragheh

Ordination history of Denha I
Episcopal succession
Bishops consecrated by Denha I as principal consecrator
- Mar Yahballaha: 1279

Mar Denha I (also written Dinkha I) was Patriarch of the Church of the East from 1265 to 1281. He was widely suspected of murdering Shem'on Bar Qaligh, bishop of Tus, and was remembered by later generations as Denha Qatola, 'Denha the Murderer'.

== Patriarchate ==
In 1268 the Patriarch had moved from Baghdad, first to Oshnou in Azerbaijan and later to Urmia and Maragheh. He was forced to relocate to Erbil due to Mongol incrusions in Baghdad.

Denha I was patriarch when Rabban Bar Sauma and his companion Rabban Markos arrived in Persia, on their pilgrimage from China towards Jerusalem. Denha had his seat in Baghdad at that time, and requested the two monks to visit the court of Abaqa in order to obtain confirmation letters for Mar Denha's ordination as Patriarch. Intending to establish them as leaders of the Church of the East in China, Denha consecrated Markos as Mar Yahballaha, Bishop of Katai and Ong, and named Rabban Bar Sauma vicar general. Later, Denha charged the monks to return to China as his messengers. However, their departure was delayed due to armed conflict along the route. When Denha died, Markos was elected as his successor.

A modern assessment of Denha's reign can be found in David Wilmshurst's The Martyred Church.

Denha maintained a cordial relationship with the maphrian of the Syriac Orthodox Church, Gregory Barhebraeus. Upon his death, the disciple of Rabban Bar Sauma, Markos, was ordained patriarch, taking the name Yahballaha.

== Notes ==
Church of the East titles
Preceded by Makkikha II (1257–1265)	Catholicos-Patriarch of the East (1265–1281)	Succeeded by Yahballaha III (1281–1317)
