= Kitbuqa =

Mongol general (died 1260)

Kitbuqa Noyan
- Born: c. 1200; Mongolia
- Died: 3 September 1260; Ain Jalut, Mamluk Sultanate
- Military career
- Allegiance: Mongol Empire
- Branch: Ilkhanate Army
- Rank: General
- Conflicts: Mongol invasions of the Levant; Battle of Ain Jalut †

Kitbuqa Noyan (died 1260), also spelled Kitbogha, Kitboga, or Ketbugha, was an Eastern Christian of the Naimans, a group that was subservient to the Mongol Empire. He was a lieutenant and confidant of the Mongol Ilkhan Hulagu, assisting him in his conquests in the Middle East including the sack of Baghdad in 1258. When Hulagu took the bulk of his forces back with him to attend a ceremony in Mongolia, Kitbuqa was left in control of Syria, and was responsible for further Mongol raids southwards towards the Mamluk Sultanate based in Cairo. He was killed in 1260 at the Battle of Ain Jalut, which was the first major loss of the Mongolian advances and halted their expansion into Arabia and Europe.

== Biography ==
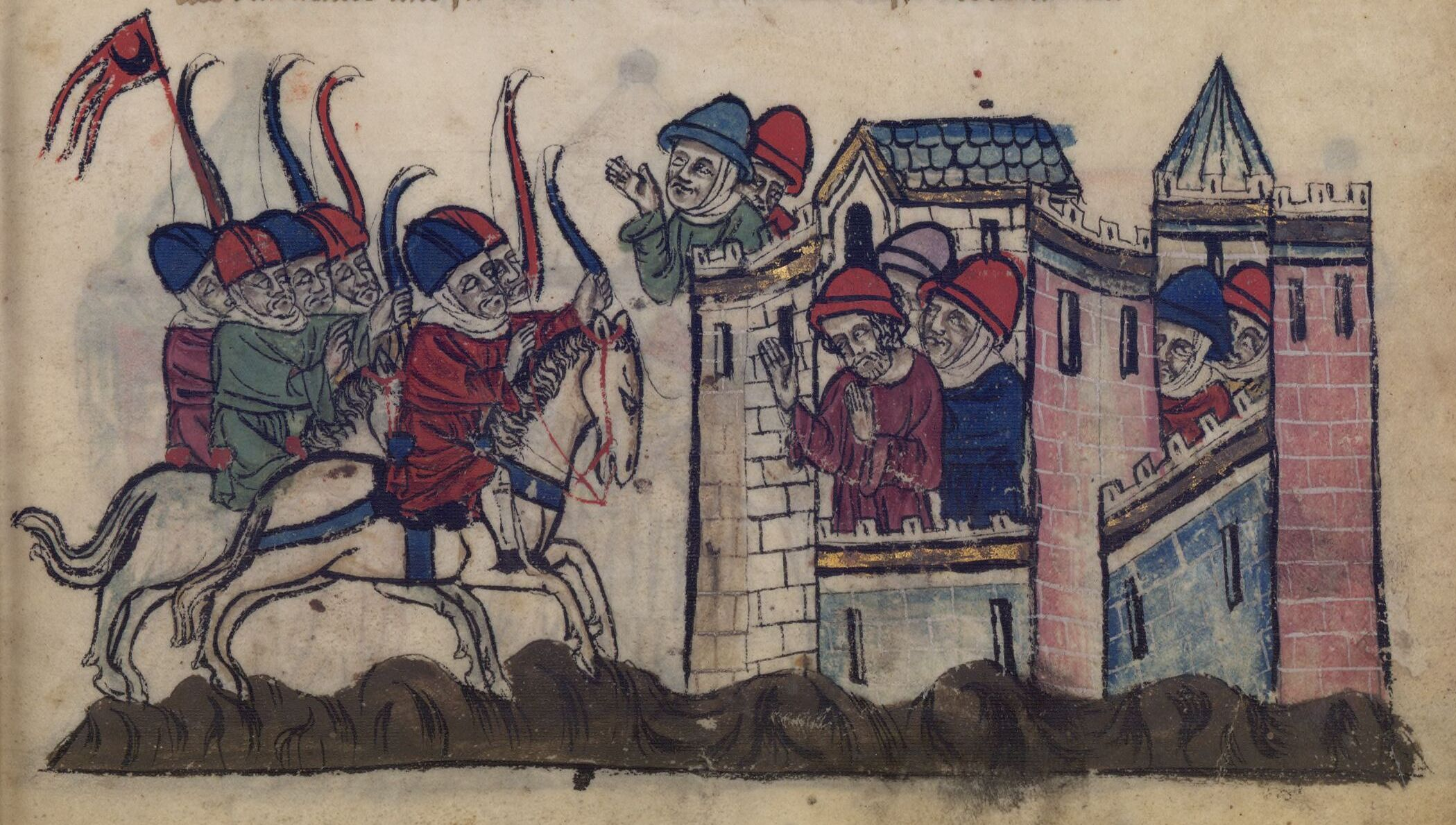
Siege of Sidon: Kitbuqa vs. Julian Grenier in 1260. From Hayton of Corycus, Fleur des histoires d'orient.

In 1252, Möngke Khan ordered Kitbuqa to lead the advance guard of Hulagu Khan's army against the fortresses of the Nizari Ismailis. He advanced with Hulagu into western Persia, mounting a series of sieges, and commanded one of the flanks that sacked Baghdad in 1258 before assisting in the conquest of Damascus in 1260. (Note: "On 1 March Kitbuqa entered Damascus at the head of a Mongol army. With him were the King of Armenia and the Prince of Antioch. The citizens of the ancient capital of the Caliphate saw for the first time for six centuries three Christian potentates ride in triumph through their streets".)

Historical accounts, quoting from the writings of the medieval historian Templar of Tyre, would often describe the three Christian rulers (Hethum I of Armenia, Bohemond VI of Antioch, and Kitbuqa) entering the city of Damascus together in triumph, though modern historians have characterized this story as apocryphal.

When Hulagu Khan withdrew his forces, responding to internal events in the Mongol Empire (the death of Hulagu's brother, the Great Möngke Khan), Kitbuqa was left in charge of the Mongol army remaining in the Middle East:

Kitbuqa, who had been left by Hulagu in Syria and Palestine, held the Land in peace and in state of rest. And he greatly loved and honoured the Christians because he was of the lineage of the Three Kings of Orient who came to Bethlehem to adore the nativity of Our Lord. Kitbuqa worked at recovering the Holy Land.

— Hayton of Corycus, La flor des estoires de la terre d'Orient (1307).

== Battle of Ain Jalut ==
In command of a force estimated to be between 10,000 and 20,000 troops, Kitbuqa attempted to continue the Mongol advance towards Egypt. However, the Mamluks had negotiated a passive truce with the Crusaders, allowing the Mamluks to advance northwards through Crusader territory, and camp for resupply near the Crusader stronghold of Acre. In this way, the Mamluks were able to engage the depleted Mongol army near Galilee, at the pivotal Battle of Ain Jalut (spring of Goliath). The Mongols were defeated, and Kitbuqa was captured. When he was brought, bound, before the Mamluk sultan he was defiant, describing the Mongol vengeance that would befall the victors. He taunted the Mamluk emirs, saying how he had always been loyal to his master, whilst they had betrayed theirs. Kitbuqa was executed by veteran Mamluk Jamal al-Din Akoush al-Shamsy.

Mamluk histories speak of Kitbuqa with respect, painting him as a great warrior who refused to retreat when the Mongols were clearly being overpowered at Ain Jalut, and who favored death in battle over retreat and shame. It was expected that Kitbuqa's death would be avenged by Hulagu, but an internal conflict between Hulagu and his cousin Berke of the Mongol Golden Horde prevented this from happening. Kitbuqa's death and the defeat of the Mongols at Ain Jalut marked the beginning of the end for the Westward expansion of the Mongol Empire. It was the first occasion they had been decisively defeated and failed to avenge such a loss, though the Mongols continued to invade Syria, Japan, Hungary, Poland and Southeast Asia for the next several decades.

== Bibliography ==
- Runciman, Steven (1987). A History of the Crusades: Volume 3, The Kingdom of Acre and the Later Crusades. Cambridge University Press. ISBN 9780521347723.
