= Tekuder =

Sultan of the Persian-based Ilkhanate (1246-1284) (r. 1282-1284)

Ahmed Tekuder
- Sultan
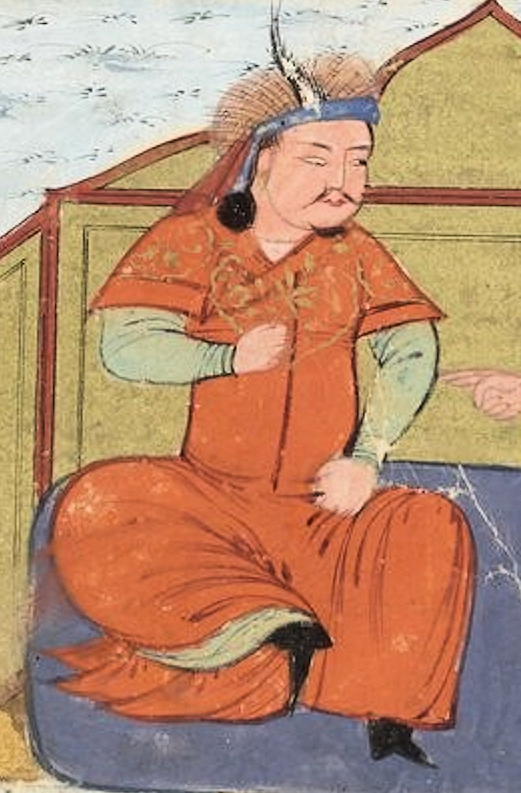
- Tekuder in Jami' al-tawarikh, 1430

Il-Khan
- Reign: 6 May 1282 – 10 August 1284
- Predecessor: Abaqa
- Successor: Arghun
- Born: Nicholas Tegüder; 1246 or 1247
- Died: August 10, 1284 (aged 37)
- Consort: see below
- Issue: see below
Names
- Sultan Ahmed Tekuder bin Hulagu Khan
- House: Borjigin
- Dynasty: Hulaguid
- Father: Hulegu Khan
- Mother: Qutui Khatun
- Religion: Sunni Islam

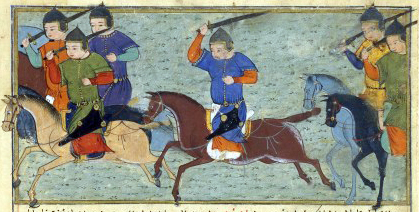
Tekuder leading his Mongol warriors.

Ahmed Tekuder (Mongolian: Төгөлдөр, romanized: Tögöldör, lit. 'perfect'; Persian: تکودار; c. 1246 – 10 August 1284), also known as Sultan Ahmad, was the sultan of the Ilkhanate from 1282 to 1284. He was a son of Hulegu and brother of Abaqa. He was eventually succeeded by his nephew Arghun Khan.

== Early life ==
Tekuder was born c. 1246 in Mongolia to Hulagu and Qutui Khatun from the Mongol Khongirad tribe as his seventh son. His birth date is not mentioned elsewhere but according to sources he died aged 37, therefore his birth year must have been around 1246 or 1247. He was baptized in his childhood as a Nestorian Christian and was given the name Nicholas. He arrived in the Ilkhanate sometime in the 1260s with his mother Qutui and brother Tekshin. Years later, he was granted governorship of Nahavand and Dinavar by Abaqa, who respected his mother Qutui. Qutui was also invested with territories with income of 100.000 gold coins near Mayyafariqin by Abaqa.

== Conversion to Islam ==
The circumstances of Tekuder's conversion to Islam are unknown. However, according to Ibn al-Fuwati he had been given information about his religious mentor and perhaps the person responsible for Tekuder's conversion - Kamal al-Din Abd ul-Rahman. He was described as a Greek slave of al-Musta'sim Billah, who rose in rank thanks to his skills at alchemy and met Abaqa to whom he was introduced by Aybak. Abd ul-Rahman was introduced to Tekuder later by his mother Qutui Khatun. Tekuder sometime later converted to Islam and changed his name to Ahmed, while Abd ul-Rahman would later rise in court and eventually be an ambassador to Mamluk Egypt.

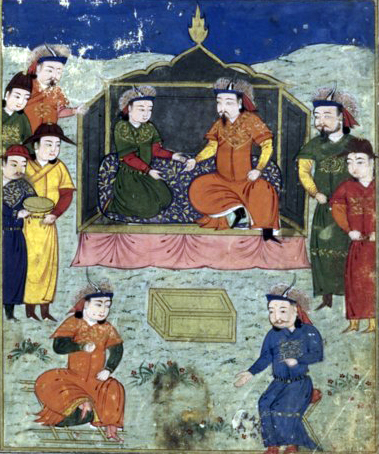
Arghun and Tekuder.

== Election and reign ==
He arrived to the Jaghatu valley near Maragha to attend the kurultai for the election of new Il-Khan after Abaqa's death in April 1282. The main competition was between his nephew Arghun, his brother Möngke-Temür, and himself. He was supported by most of the nobles and emirs, including Jalairs such as Shiktur Noyan, Suqunjaq Noyan and the Khongirads. He was elected on 6 May 1282 and enthroned on 21 June 1282 at Aladagh (Turkish: Aladağ, lit. 'Great Mountain'), east of lake Van. He adopted his Muslim name Ahmed as his regnal name.

His first act was to clear Ata-Malik Juvayni of charges brought against him by Majd al-Mulk Yazdi, a vizier who accused him of embezzling state funds. Tekuder restored him to the government of Baghdad, while people lynched Majd al-Mulk for witchcraft. He also appointed his younger half-brother, Qonqurtai, as viceroy of Anatolia the following month. However Arghun believed that the Juvayni brothers were responsible for his father's death by poisoning. He came to Baghdad to spend the winter of 1282-1283 and restarted the investigation of the accusations of embezzlement which may have caused Ata Malik's stroke on 5 March 1283.

=== Rivalry with Arghun ===
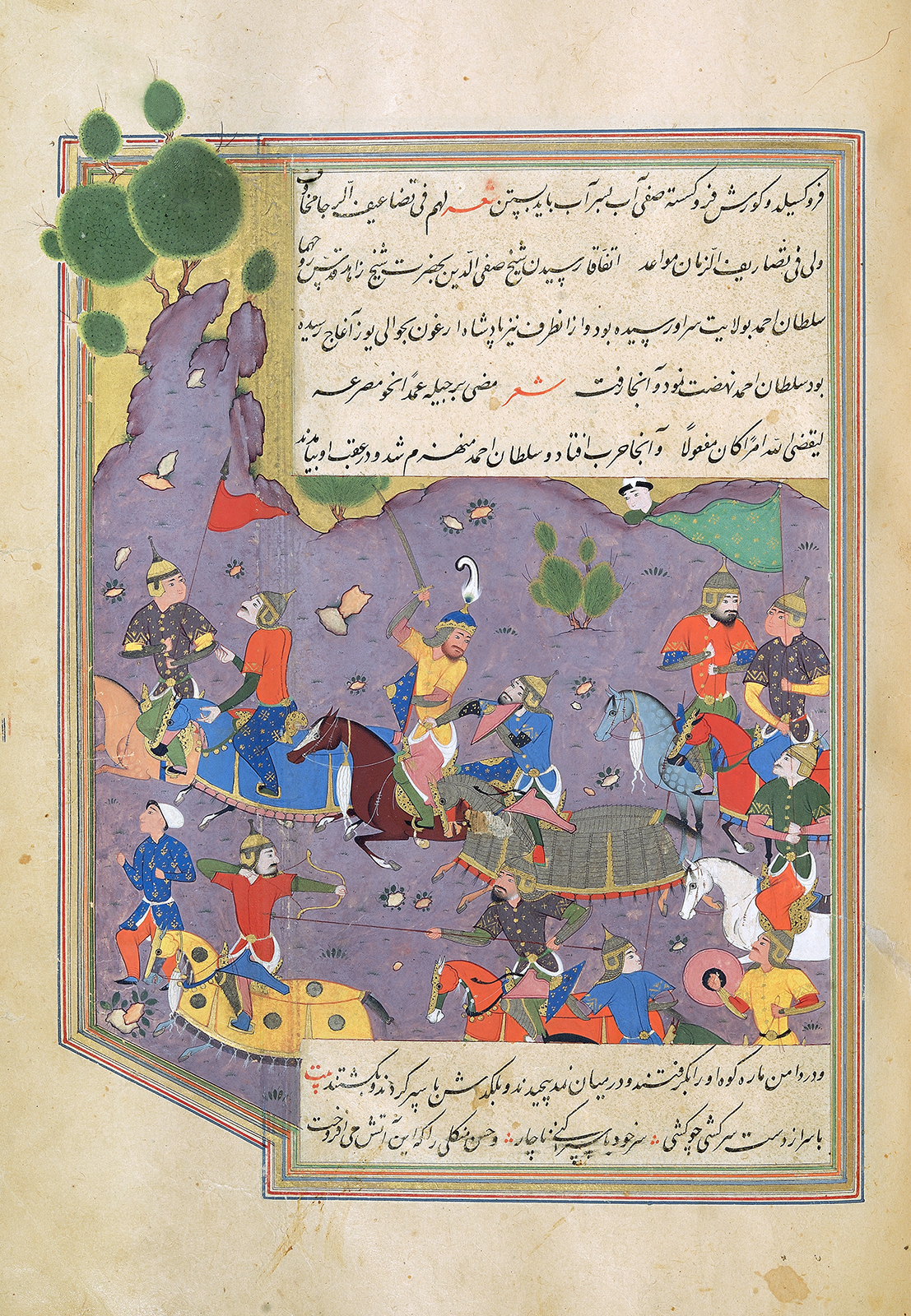
"The war of two Il-Khanid rulers, Arghun Khan vs. Sultan Ahmad" (Tekuder). Folio from a revised, Safavid-era edition of the Safvat al-safa ("The Quintessence of Purity"), Shiraz, Iran, dated September 1582

As Arghun's dissatisfaction grew, he left for Khorasan in spring to gain the allegiance of minor nobles and amirs. Tekuder on the other hand began to be suspicious of his half-brother Qonqurtai and Arghun's potential alliance. Qonqurtai was accused of conspiracy and was arrested by Tekuder's son-in-law, Alinaq Noyan - the viceroy of Georgia - on 17 January 1284, and was executed the next day. An army contingent was sent to Jazira, from where Gaykhatu and Baydu fled to Khorasan, to Arghun's encampment while several emirs such as Taghachar and Doladai were arrested.

His next step was to send Alinaq with 15,000 men against Arghun, while he himself followed Alinaq on 26 April with his main army composed of Armenians and Georgians in addition to Mongols stationed in Mughan plain near Bilasuvar. Arghun prevailed against Alinaq in battle on 4 May, south of Qazvin, but nevertheless retreated to his lands in Khorasan. Ala ud-Daula Simnani, future Sufi saint of Kubrawiya order also fought in Arghun's army during this battle. Arghun tried negotiate a truce, which Ahmad, against the advice of his councillors, refused. Another embassy sent by Arghun, this time led by his son Ghazan arrived at Tekuder's camp near Semnan on 31 May. The embassy was a success, as Ahmad accepted a truce on the condition that Arghun send his brother Gaykhatu as a hostage. Arghun agreed to the terms and sent his brother accompanied by two amirs, including Nawruz into the custody of Buqa, then the most senior of Tekuder's commanders, on 13 or 28 June. Buqa in turn handed him over to Ahmad who put Gaykhatu in Tödai Khatun's encampment.

Despite this, Tekuder continued hostilities and continued to advance on Arghun. This caused Buqa to harbour resentment towards Tekuder and to grow more sympathetic to Arghun. On the other hand, he lost the favour of Tekuder who started to invest his trust in Aq Buqa, another Jalair general.

Arghun's next step was to seek refuge in Kalat-e Naderi, a strong fortress on 7 July with 100 men. But he was forced to surrender to Alinaq four days later. Victorious, Tekuder left Arghun in Alinaq's custody while he himself left for Kalpush, where his main army was stationed. This was the opportunity Buqa was seeking - he broke into Alinaq's camp and set Arghun free, while killing Alinaq. Tekuder fled west and looted Buqa's encampment near Sultaniya in revenge. He continued on to his own pasturelands near Takht-i Suleyman on 17 July planning to escape to the Golden Horde via Derbent. However, Qaraunas, who had been sent by Buqa, soon caught up with and arrested Tekuder. He was turned over to Arghun on 26 July on the Ab-i Shur pasturelands, near Maragha.

== Trial and death ==
Tekuder was accused of the unjust execution of Qonqurtai, his half-brother in a trial presided over by Arghun. While Tekuder asked for mercy and clemency, Qonqurtai's Chinese (or Khitan) mother Ajuja demanded his execution. While not in favour of execution, the rebellions of his uncle Hulachu and cousin Jushkab in Hamadan forced him decide in favour of Qonqurtai's family. They had Ahmed executed on 10 August 1284 by breaking his back.

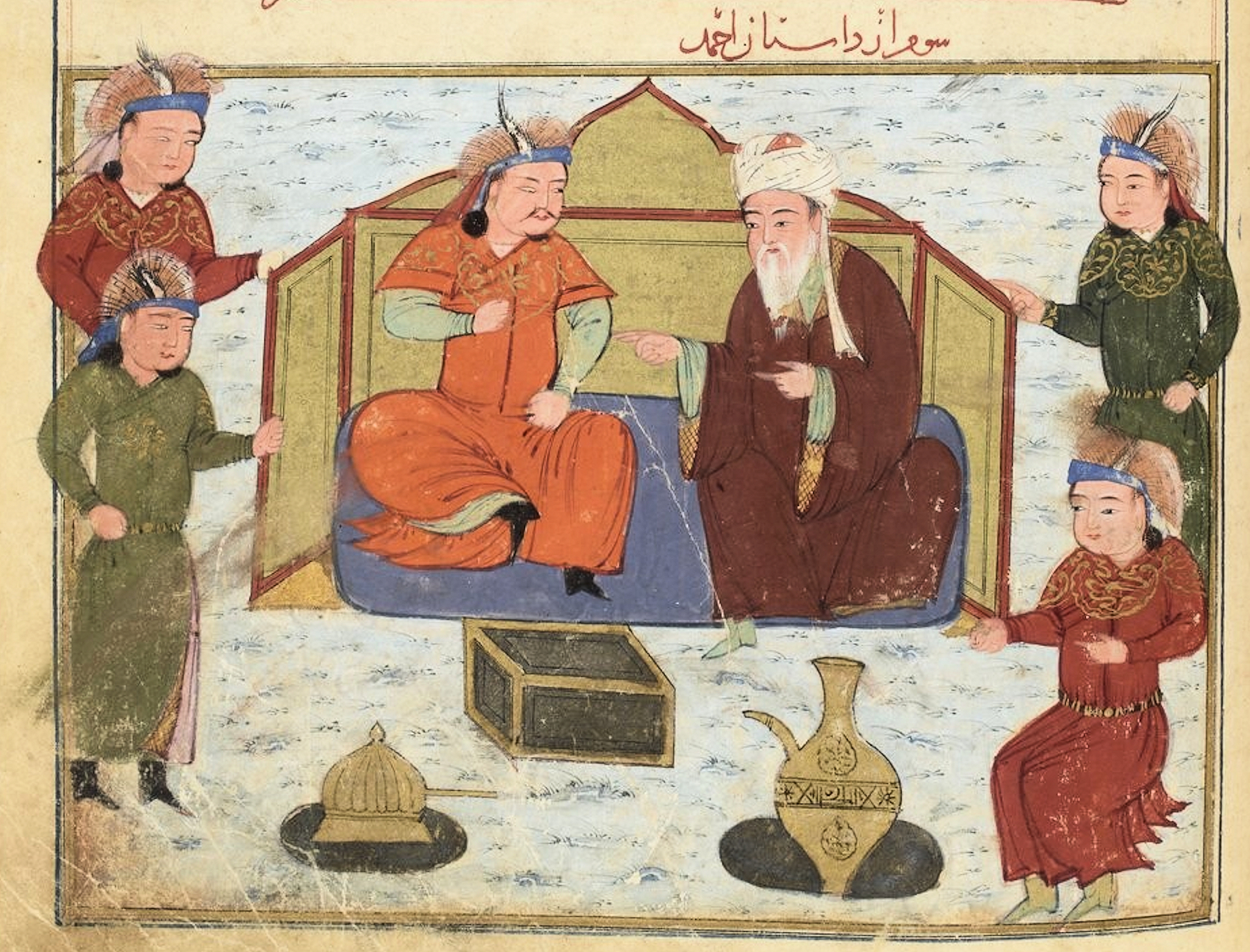
Tekuder and Shams al-Din Juvayni.

== Relations with Mamluks ==
Shams al-Din Juvayni advised him to make peace with Mamluk Egypt since he was a Muslim sultan. The first embassy headed by Qutb al-Din Shirazi left Aladagh for Egypt on 25 August 1282. He expressed his aim to forge an alliance with Qalawun against the wishes of his own council in a letter. Qalawun sent a reply on 3 December 1282 urging Tekuder to release the Sultanate of Rum from vassalage as a fellow Muslim. Tekuder sent a second embassy, headed by his religious mentor Kamal al-Din Abd ul-Rahman to Egypt from Tabriz in June 1283. However, this embassy was late as it arrived on 2 March 1284 and was granted audience on 26 August 1284, 16 days after Tekuder's death. Which led to the envoy's arrest and death.

When Arghun received no reply, he declared war against Tekuder. Tekuder requested help from the Mamluk Sultan, but the Mamluks did not fully co-operate with him. Having a small and inferior army, Tekuder was defeated by Arghun's larger force, and he was eventually executed on August 10, 1284. Shams al-Din Juvayni was also arrested and executed by Buqa on 16 October 1284.

== Family ==
Tekuder had eight consorts from different clans and several children with them:

- Senior wife - Töküz Khatun, a lady from the Khongirad tribe
  - Kuchuk Khatun - married to Alinaq of Keraites
- Second wife - Armini Khatun, a lady from the Khongirad tribe
  - Qaplanchi
  - Arslanchi
  - Könchek Khatun (executed by Abu Sa'id in 1319) - married to Irinjin of Keraites (nephew of Doquz Khatun)
  - Chechak Khatun - married to Borachu, son of Durabai - Governor of Diyar Bakr
  - Maynu Khatun - married to Jandan, son of Garai Baurchi of Tatars
- Baytegin Khatun, daughter of Husayn Agha of Jalairs;
- Tödegü Khatun, daughter of Musa Güregen of Khongirad (a son of Princess Tumelün)
  - Saylun Khatun - married to Qaracha of Keraites
- El Qutlugh Khatun, daughter of Kingshu or Orghutaq (in both cases, a granddaughter of Jumghur, a son of Hulagu)
- Tödai Khatun (m. 6 April 1284), widow of Abaqa Khan;
- Qurquchin Agachi
  - Noghachi
- Qonqurchin Agachi
  - Kalturmish Khatun - married firstly to Shadai, son of Bughu (perhaps Buqa), married secondly to Toghan, son of Shadai of Jalairs in levirate

== Sources ==
- Atwood, Christopher P. (2004). The Encyclopedia of Mongolia and the Mongol Empire. Facts on File, Inc. ISBN 0-8160-4671-9.
- David Morgan, The Mongols

Regnal titles
| Preceded by Abaqa | Ilkhan (Sultan); 1282–1284 | Succeeded by Arghun |
