= Hulegu Khan =

Western Asian Mongol ruler (c. 1217–1265)

Hulegu Khan ᠬᠦᠯᠡᠭᠦ ᠬᠠᠭᠠᠨ
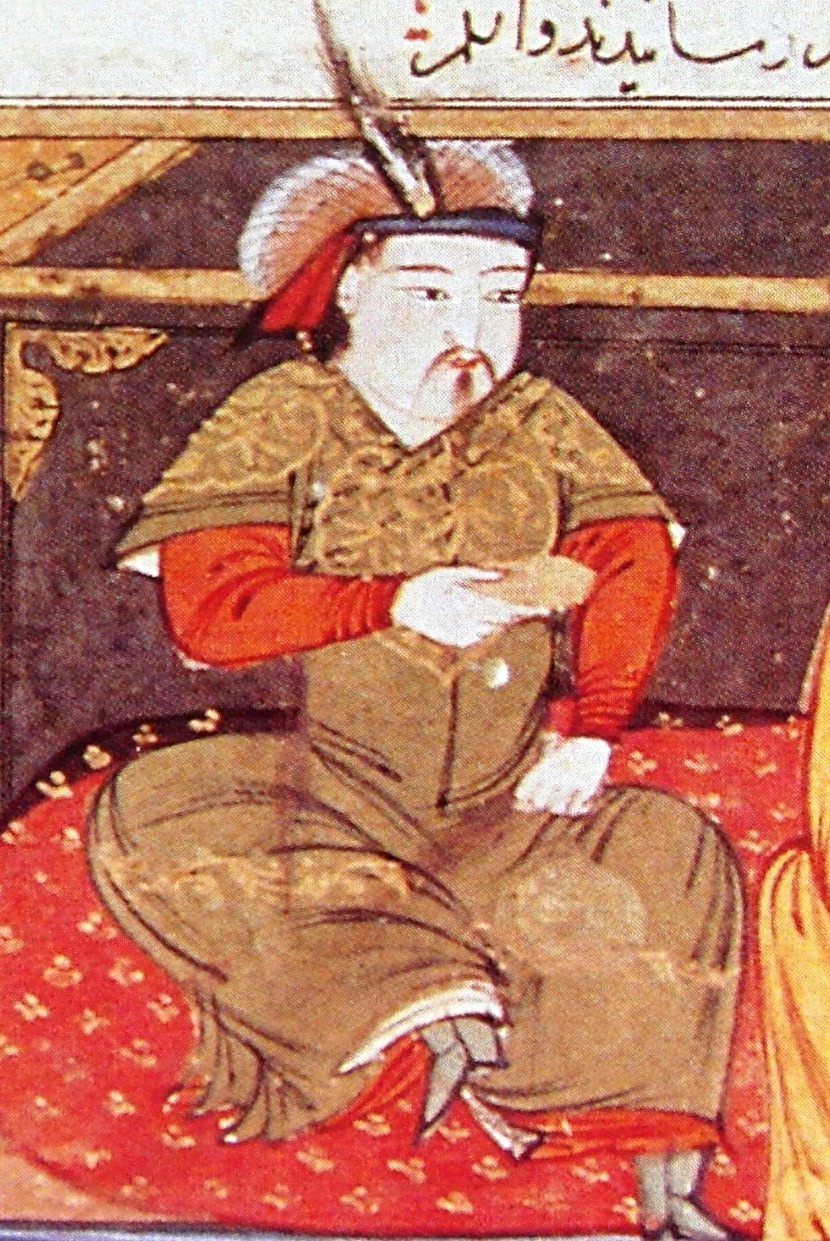
- Painting of Hulegu Khan by Rashid-al-Din Hamadani, early 14th century

Ilkhan
- Reign: 1256 – 8 February 1265
- Successor: Abaqa Khan
- Born: c. 1217; Mongolia
- Died: 8 February 1265 (aged 47); Zarrineh River
- Burial: Shahi Island, Lake Urmia
- Consort: Guyuk Khatun; Doquz Khatun; Yesuncin Khatun; Qutui Khatun; Öljei Khatun
- Issue: Tekuder; Abaqa Khan; Jumghur; Möngke Temür (Ilkhanate); Yoshmut; Qonqurtai
- House: Borjigin
- Dynasty: Hulaguid (founder)
- Father: Tolui
- Mother: Sorghaghtani Beki
- Religion: Buddhism
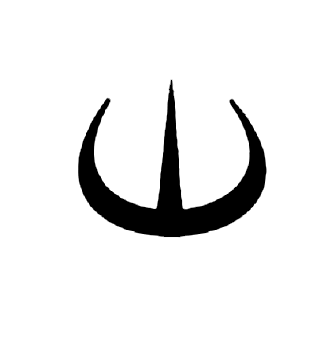
- Tamgha

Hulegu Khan, also known as Hülegü or Hulagu (Note: Mongolian: Хүлэгү/ᠬᠦᠯᠡᠭᠦ, romanized: Hu’legu’/Qülegü, lit. 'Surplus'; Chagatay: هلیگو; Persian: هولاکو خان; Arabic: هولاكو خان; Chinese: 旭烈兀; pinyin: Xùlièwù [ɕû.ljê.û]) (c. 1217 – 8 February 1265), was a Mongol ruler who conquered much of West Asia. As a son of Tolui and the Keraite princess Sorghaghtani Beki, he was a grandson of Genghis Khan and brother of Ariq Böke, Möngke Khan, and Kublai Khan.

Hulegu's army greatly expanded the southwestern portion of the Mongol Empire, founding the Ilkhanate in Persia. Under Hulegu's leadership, the Mongols sacked and destroyed Baghdad, ending the Islamic Golden Age and the Abbasid dynasty. They also weakened Damascus, causing a shift of Islamic influence to the Mamluk Sultanate in Cairo.

== Early life ==
Hulegu was born to Tolui, one of Genghis Khan's sons, and Sorghaghtani Beki, an influential Keraite princess and a niece of Toghrul in 1217. Not much is known of Hulegu's childhood except of an anecdote given in Jami' al-Tawarikh and he once met his grandfather Genghis Khan with Kublai in 1224.

== Military campaigns ==
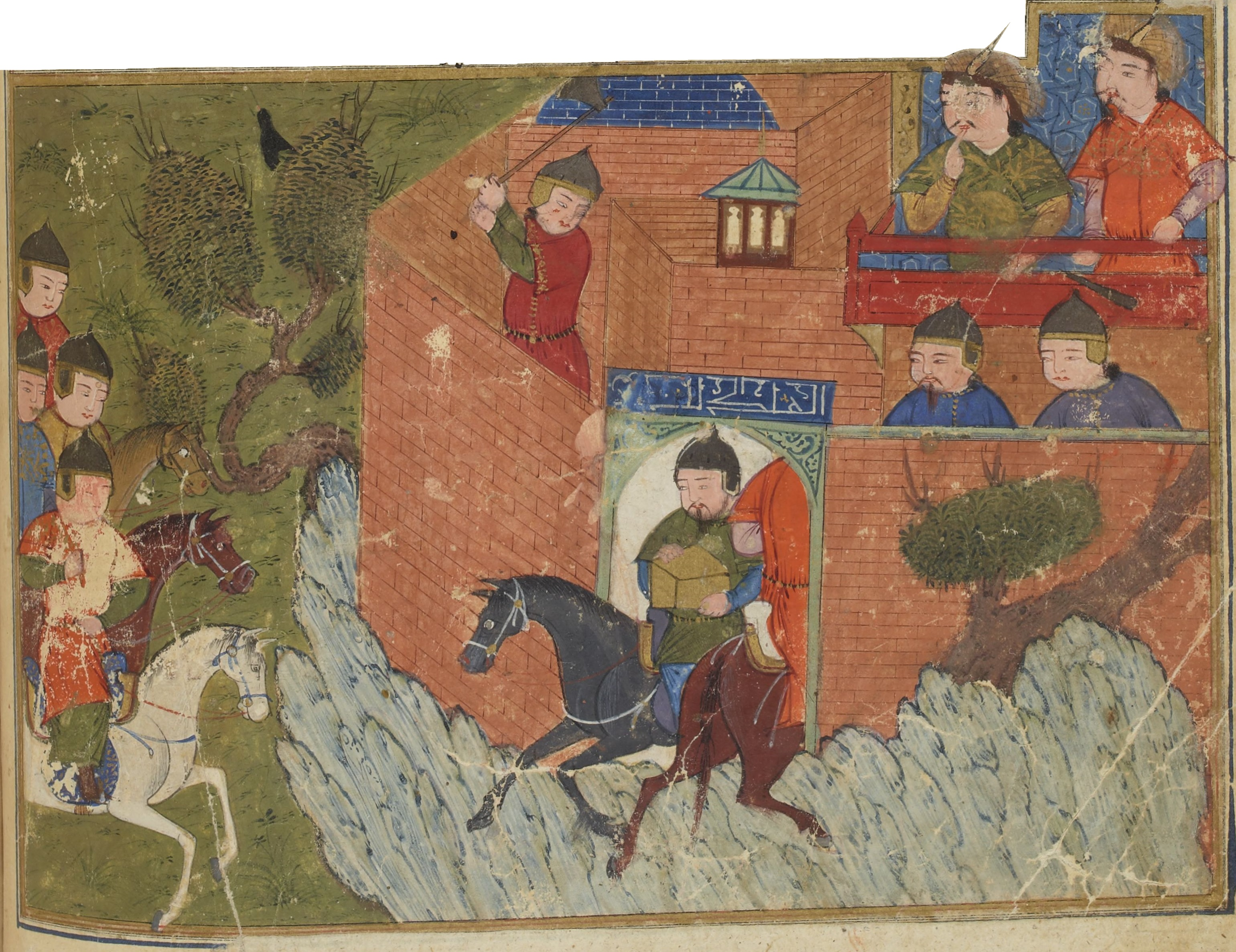
The siege of Alamût in 1256

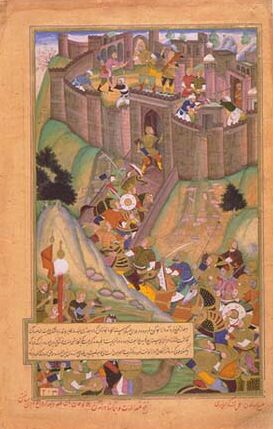
A Mughal painting of Hulegu's siege of Alamut

Hulegu's brother Möngke Khan had been installed as Great Khan in 1251. Möngke charged Hulegu with leading a massive Mongol army to conquer or destroy the remaining Muslim states in southwestern Asia. Hulegu's campaign sought the subjugation of the Lurs of southern Iran, the destruction of the Nizari Ismaili state (the Assassins), the submission or destruction of the Abbasid Caliphate in Baghdad, the submission or destruction of the Ayyubid states in Syria based in Damascus, and finally, the submission or destruction of the Bahri Mamluk Sultanate of Egypt. Möngke ordered Hulegu to treat kindly those who submitted and utterly destroy those who did not. Hulegu vigorously carried out the latter part of these instructions.

Hulegu marched out with perhaps the largest Mongol army ever assembled – by order of Möngke, two-tenths of the empire's fighting men were gathered for Hulegu's army in 1253. He arrived at Transoxiana in 1255. He easily destroyed the Lurs, and the Assassins surrendered their impregnable fortress of Alamut without a fight, accepting a deal that spared the lives of their people in early 1256. He chose Azerbaijan as his power base, while ordering Baiju to retreat to Anatolia. From at least 1257 onwards, Muslims and Christians of every major religious variety in Europe, the Middle East, and mainland Asia were a part of Hulegu's army.

=== Siege of Baghdad ===
Hulegu's Mongol army set out for Baghdad in November 1257. Once near the city he divided his forces to threaten the city on both the east and west banks of the Tigris. Hulegu demanded surrender, but the caliph, Al-Musta'sim, refused. Due to the treason of Abu Alquma, an advisor to Al-Musta'sim, an uprising in the Baghdad army took place and Siege of Baghdad began. The attacking Mongols broke dikes and flooded the ground behind the caliph's army, trapping them. Much of the army was slaughtered or drowned.

The Mongols under Chinese general Guo Kan laid siege to the city on 29 January 1258, constructing a palisade and a ditch and wheeling up siege engines and catapults. The battle was short by siege standards. By 5 February the Mongols controlled a stretch of the wall. The caliph tried to negotiate but was refused. On 10 February Baghdad surrendered. The Mongols swept into the city on 13 February and began a week of destruction. The Grand Library of Baghdad (also called 'Bayt al-Hikmah), containing countless precious historical documents and books on subjects ranging from medicine to astronomy, was destroyed. Citizens attempted to flee but were intercepted by Mongol soldiers.

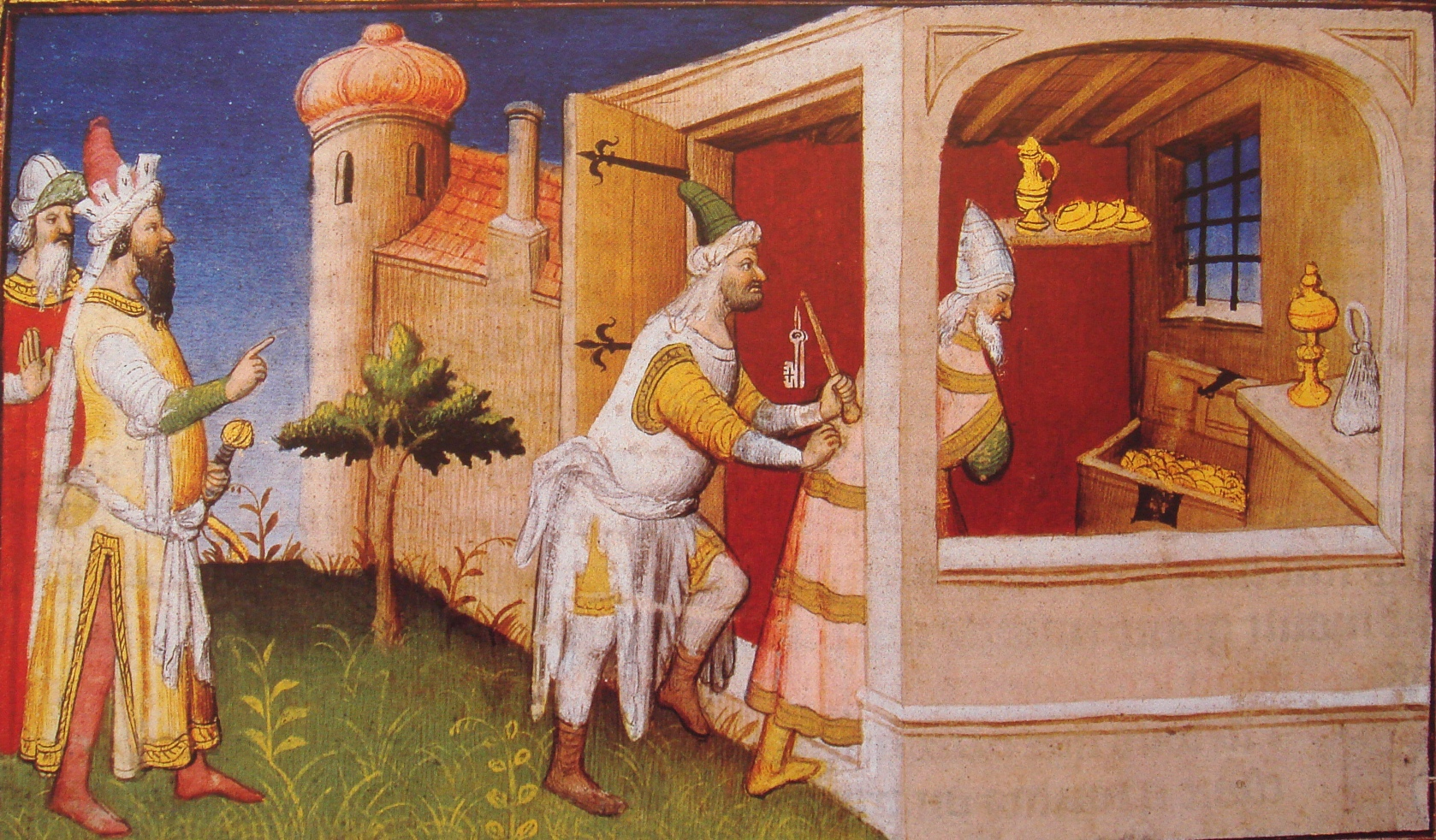
Hulegu (left) imprisons the Caliph among his treasures to starve him to death. Medieval depiction from "Le livre des merveilles", 15th century.

Death counts vary widely and cannot be easily substantiated: A low estimate is about 90,000 dead; higher estimates range from 200,000 to a million. The Mongols looted and then destroyed buildings. Mosques, palaces, libraries, hospitals—grand buildings that had been the work of generations—were burned to the ground. The caliph was captured and forced to watch as his citizens were murdered and his treasury plundered. Il Milione, a book on the travels of Venetian merchant Marco Polo, states that Hulegu starved the caliph to death, but there is no corroborating evidence for that. Most historians believe the Mongol and Muslim accounts that the caliph was rolled up in a rug and the Mongols rode their horses over him, as they believed that the earth would be offended if touched by royal blood. All but one of his sons were killed. Baghdad underwent a severe decline in importance after the siege, although according to historian Michal Biran, Hulegu ordered the city rebuilt and the libraries were reopened within two years. Smaller states in the region hastened to reassure Hulegu of their loyalty, and the Mongols turned to Syria in 1259, conquering the Ayyubid dynasty and sending advance patrols as far ahead as Gaza.

A thousand squads of northern Chinese sappers accompanied Hulegu during his conquest of West Asia.

=== Conquest of Syria (1260) ===
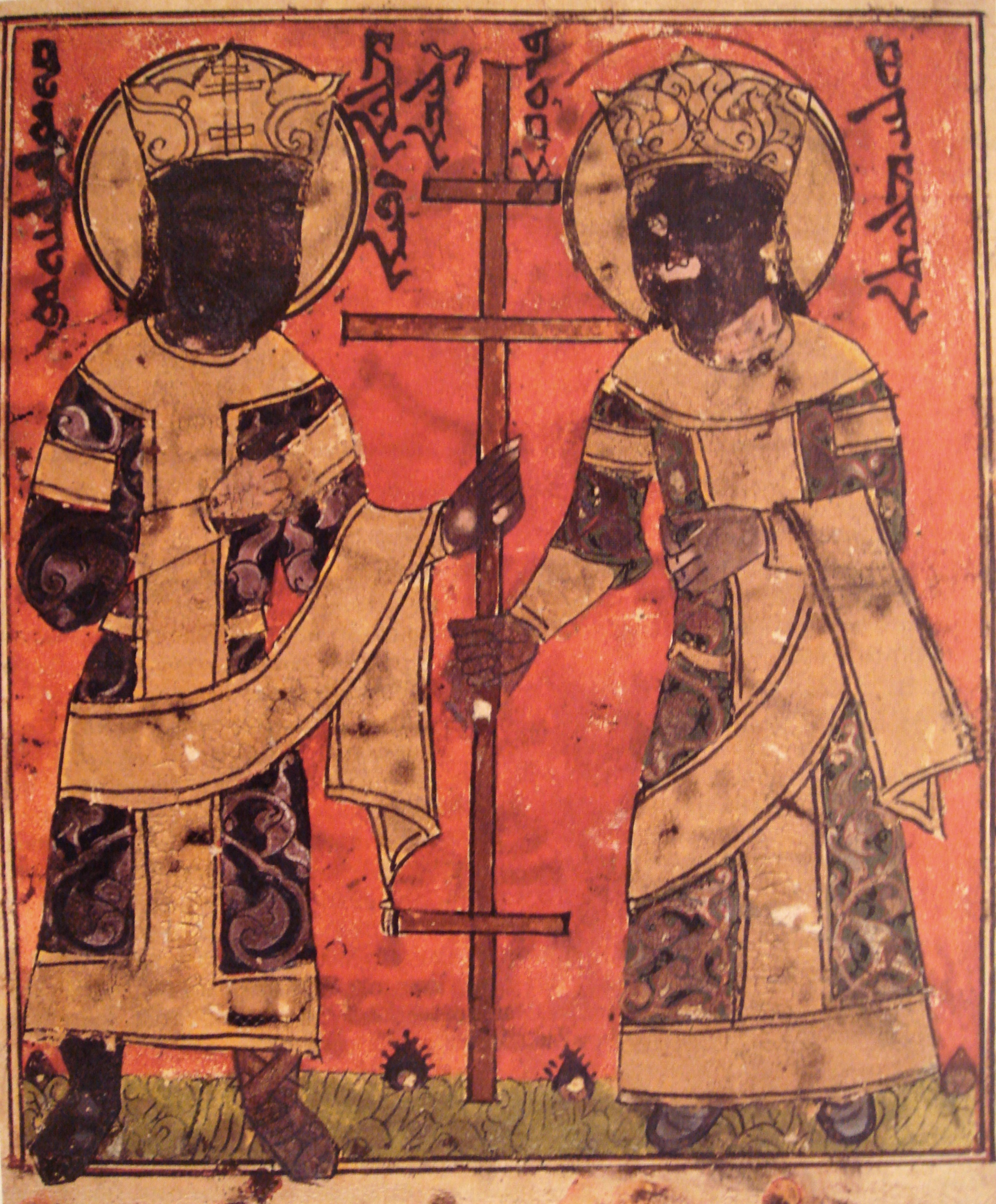
Hulegu and Queen Doquz Qatun depicted as the new Constantine and Helen in a Syriac bible.

In 1260, Mongol forces combined with those of their Christian vassals in the region, including the army of the Armenian Kingdom of Cilicia under Hethum I, King of Armenia and the Franks of Bohemond VI of Antioch. This force conquered Muslim Syria, a domain of the Ayyubid dynasty. They captured Aleppo by siege and, under the Christian general Kitbuqa, seized Damascus on 1 March 1260. (Note: "On 1 March Kitbuqa entered Damascus at the head of a Mongol army. With him were the King of Armenia and the Prince of Antioch. The citizens of the ancient capital of the Caliphate saw for the first time for six centuries three Christian potentates ride in triumph through their streets".) A Christian Mass was celebrated in the Umayyad Mosque and numerous mosques were profaned. Many historical accounts describe the three Christian rulers Hethum, Bohemond, and Kitbuqa entering the city of Damascus together in triumph, though some modern historians such as David Morgan have questioned this story as apocryphal.

The invasion effectively destroyed the Ayyubids, which was until then a powerful dynasty that had ruled large parts of the Levant, Egypt, and the Arabian Peninsula. The last Ayyubid king, An-Nasir Yusuf, had been killed by Hulegu this same year. With Baghdad ravaged and Damascus weakened, the center of Islamic power shifted to the Mamluk sultan's capital of Cairo.

Hulegu intended to send forces southward through Palestine toward Cairo. So he had a threatening letter delivered by an envoy to the Egyptian Mamluk Sultan Qutuz in Cairo demanding that Qutuz open his city or it would be destroyed like Baghdad. Then, because food and fodder in Syria had become insufficient to supply his full force, and because it was a regular Mongol practice to move troops to the cooler highlands for the summer, Hulegu withdrew his main force to Iran near Azerbaijan, leaving behind one tumen (10,000 men or less) under Kitbuqa, accompanied by Armenian, Georgian, and Frankish volunteers, which Hulegu considered sufficient. Hulegu then personally departed for Mongolia to play his role in the imperial succession conflict occasioned by the death some eight months earlier of Great Khan Möngke. But upon receiving news of how few Mongols now remained in the region, Qutuz quickly assembled his well-trained and equipped 20,000-strong army at Cairo and invaded Palestine. He then allied himself with a fellow Mamluk leader, Baybars in Syria, who not only needed to protect his own future from the Mongols but was eager to avenge for Islam the Mongol capture of Damascus, looting of Baghdad, and conquest of Syria.

The Mongols, for their part, attempted to form a Frankish-Mongol alliance with (or at least, demand the submission of) the remnant of the Crusader Kingdom of Jerusalem, now centered on Acre, but Pope Alexander IV had forbidden such an alliance. Tensions between Franks and Mongols also increased when Julian of Sidon caused an incident resulting in the death of one of Kitbuqa's grandsons. Angered, Kitbuqa had sacked Sidon. The Barons of Acre, contacted by the Mongols, had also been approached by the Mamluks, seeking military assistance against the Mongols. Although the Mamluks were traditional enemies of the Franks, the Barons of Acre recognized the Mongols as the more immediate menace. Instead of taking sides, the Crusaders opted for a position of cautious neutrality between the two forces. In an unusual move, however, they allowed the Egyptian Mamluks to march northward without hindrance through Crusader territory and even let them camp near Acre to resupply.

=== Battle of Ain Jalut ===
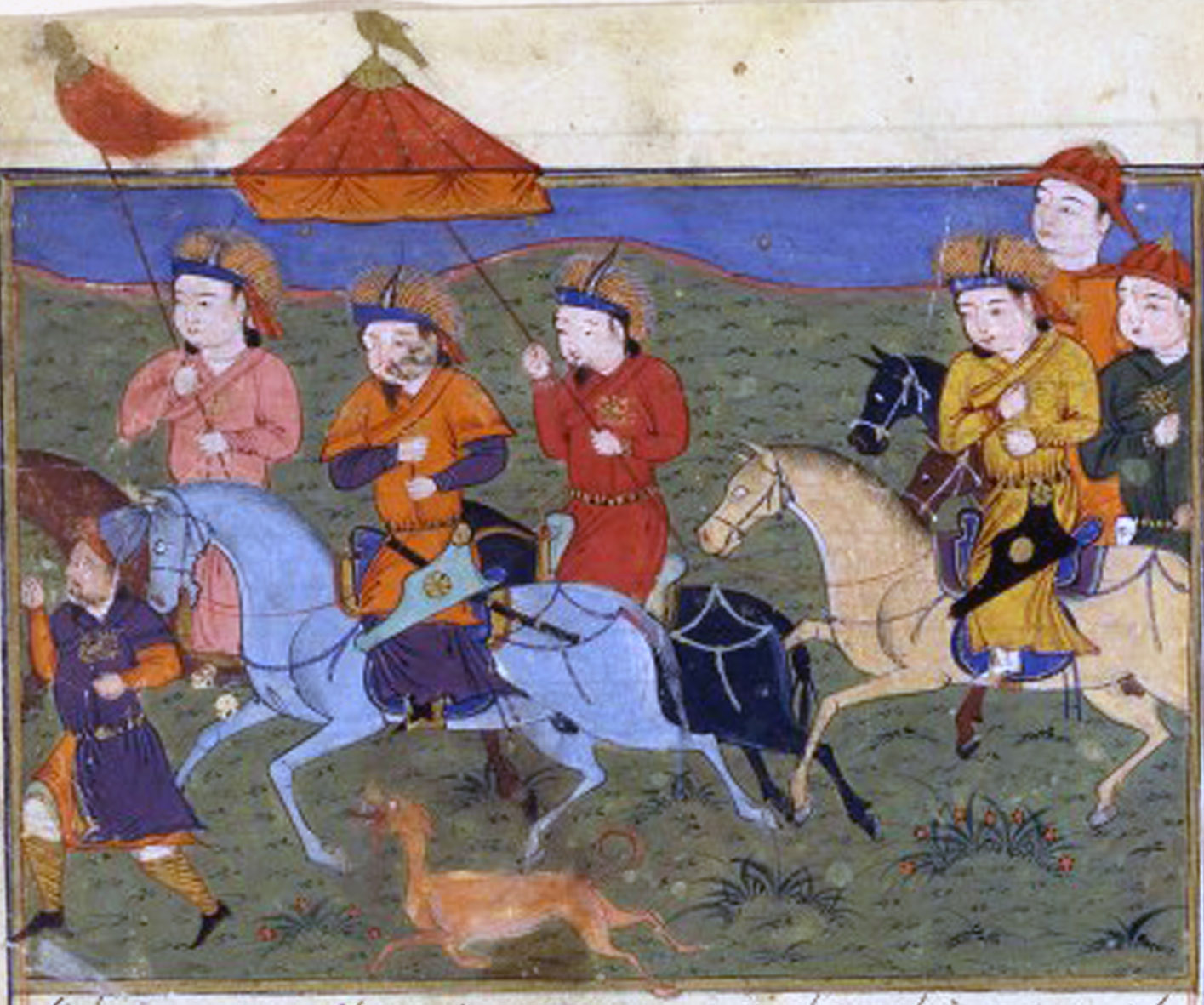
Hulegu leading his army

When news arrived that the Mongols had crossed the Jordan River in 1260, Sultan Qutuz and his forces proceeded southeast toward the 'Spring of Goliath' (Known in Arabic as 'Ain Jalut') in the Jezreel Valley. They met the Mongol army of about 12,000 in the Battle of Ain Jalut and fought relentlessly for many hours. The Mamluk leader Baybars mostly implemented hit-and-run tactics in an attempt to lure the Mongol forces into chasing him. Baybars and Qutuz had hidden the bulk of their forces in the hills to wait in ambush for the Mongols to come into range. The Mongol leader Kitbuqa, already provoked by the constant fleeing of Baybars and his troops, decided to march forwards with all his troops on the trail of the fleeing Egyptians. When the Mongols reached the highlands, Egyptians appeared from hiding, and the Mongols found themselves surrounded by enemy forces as the hidden troops hit them from the sides and Qutuz attacked the Mongol rear. Estimates of the size of the Egyptian army range from 24,000 to 120,000. The Mongols broke free of the trap and even mounted a temporarily successful counterattack, but their numbers had been depleted to the point that the outcome was inevitable. Refusing to surrender, the whole Mongol army that had remained in the region, including Kitbuqa, were cut down and killed that day. The battle of Ain Jalut established a high-water mark for the Mongol conquest.

=== Civil War with the Golden Horde ===
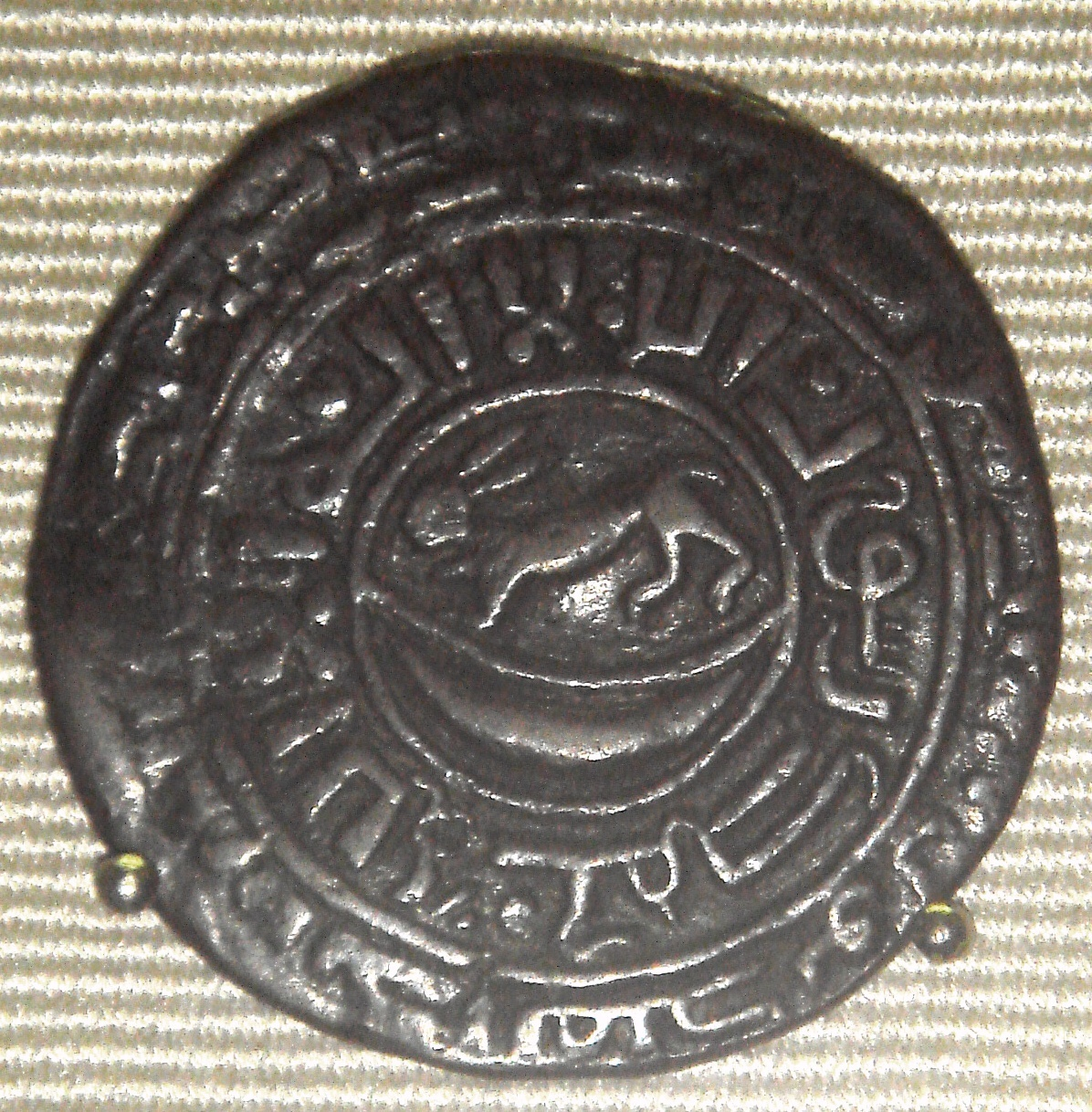
Coin of Hulegu, with the symbol of a hare

After the succession was settled and his brother Kublai Khan was established as Great Khan, Hulegu returned to his lands by 1262. When he massed his armies to attack the Mamluks and avenge the defeat at Ain Jalut, however, he was instead drawn into civil war with Batu Khan's brother Berke. Berke Khan, a Muslim convert and the grandson of Genghis Khan, had promised retribution in his rage after Hulegu's sack of Baghdad and allied himself with the Mamluks. He initiated a large series of raids on Hulegu's territories, led by Nogai Khan. Hulegu suffered a severe defeat in an attempted invasion north of the Caucasus in 1263. This was the first open war between Mongols and signaled the end of the unified empire. In retaliation for his failure, Hulegu killed Berke's ortogh, and Berke did the same in return.

Even while Berke was Muslim, out of Mongol brotherhood he at first resisted the idea of fighting Hulegu. He said, "Mongols are killed by Mongol swords. If we were united, then we would have conquered all of the world." But the economic situation of the Golden Horde due to the actions of the Ilkhanate led him to declare jihad because the Ilkhanids were hogging the wealth of North Iran and because of the Ilkhanate's demands for the Golden Horde not to sell slaves to the Mamluks.

== Communications with Europe ==
Hulegu's mother Sorghaghtani successfully navigated Mongol politics, arranging for all of her sons to become Mongol leaders. She was a Christian of the Church of the East (often referred to as "Nestorianism") and Hulegu was friendly to Christianity. Hulegu's favorite wife, Doquz Khatun, was also a Christian, as was his closest friend and general, Kitbuqa. Hulegu sent multiple communications to Europe in an attempt to establish a Franco-Mongol alliance against the Muslims. In 1262, he sent his secretary Rychaldus and an embassy to "all kings and princes overseas". The embassy was apparently intercepted in Sicily by Manfred, King of Sicily, who was allied with the Mamluk Sultanate and in conflict with Pope Urban IV, and Rychaldus was returned by ship.

On 10 April 1262, Hulegu sent a letter, through John the Hungarian, to Louis IX of France, offering an alliance. It is unclear whether the letter ever reached Louis IX in Paris – the only manuscript known to have survived was in Vienna, Austria. The letter stated Hulegu's intention to capture Jerusalem for the benefit of the Pope and asked for Louis to send a fleet against Egypt:

From the head of the Mongol army, anxious to devastate the perfidious nation of the Saracens, with the good-will support of the Christian faith (...) so that you, who are the rulers of the coasts on the other side of the sea, endeavor to deny a refuge for the Infidels, your enemies and ours, by having your subjects diligently patrol the seas.

— Letter from Hulegu to Saint Louis.

Despite many attempts, neither Hulegu nor his successors were able to form an alliance with Europe, although Mongol culture in the West was in vogue in the 13th century. Many new-born children in Italy were named after Mongol rulers, including Hulegu: names such as Can Grande ("Great Khan"), Alaone (Hulegu), Argone (Arghun), and Cassano (Ghazan) are recorded.

== Family ==
Hulegu had fourteen wives and concubines with at least 21 issues with them:

Principal wives:

- Guyuk Khatun (died in Mongolia before reaching Iran) – daughter of Toralchi Güregen of the Oirat tribe and Checheikhen Khatun
  - Jumghur (died en route to Iran in 1270s)
  - Bulughan agha – married Jorma Güregen, son of Jochi (from Tatar tribe, brother of Nukdan khatun) and Chechagan Khatun, daughter of Temüge (Otchi Noyon)
- Qutui Khatun – daughter of Chigu Noyan of Khongirad tribe and Tümelün behi (daughter of Genghis khan and Börte)
  - Takshin (d. 12 September 1270 of urinary incontinence)
  - Tekuder (1246–1284)
  - Todogaj Khatun – married to Tengiz Güregen, married secondly to Sulamish his son, married thirdly to Chichak, son of Sulamish
- Yesunchin Khatun (d. January/February 1272) – a lady from the Suldus tribe
  - Abaqa (1234–1282)
- Dokuz Khatun, daughter of Uyku (son of Toghrul) and widow of Tolui
- Öljei Khatun – half-sister of Guyuk, daughter of Toralchi Güregen of the Oirat tribe
  - Möngke Temür (b. 23 October 1256, d. 26 April 1282)
  - Jamai Khatun – married Jorma Güregen after her sister Bulughan's death
  - Manggugan Khatun – married firstly to her cousin Chakar Güregen (son of Buqa Timur and niece of Öljei Khatun), married secondly to his son Taraghai
  - Baba Khatun – married to Lagzi Güregen, son of Arghun Aqa

Concubines:

- Nogachin Aghchi, a lady from Cathay; from camp of Qutui Khatun
  - Yoshmut – Viceroy of Arran and Shirvan
  - Tubshin – Viceroy of Khorasan during Abaqa's reign
- Tuqtani (or Toqiyatai) Egechi (d. 20 February 1292) – sister of Irinjin, niece of Dokuz Khatun
- Boraqchin Agachi, from camp of Qutui Khatun
  - Taraghai (died by lightning strike on his way to Iran in 1260s)
    - Baydu
    - Eshil – married to Tuq Temür and then his brother (son of Abdullah Aqa, a general of Abaqa)
- Arighan Agachi (d. 8 February 1265) – daughter of Tengiz Güregen; from camp of Qutui Khatun
  - Ajai (d. February 1265) – Viceroy of Anatolia during reign of Abaqa and of Georgia during reign of Arghun
    - Ildar (executed by Ghazan in 1296)
- Ajuja Agachi, a lady from China or Khitans, from camp of Dokuz Khatun
  - Qonqurtai (executed on 18 January 1284 by Tekuder)
- Yeshichin Agachi, a lady from the Kür'lüüt tribe; from camp of Qutui Khatun
  - Yesüder – Viceroy of Khorasan during Abaqa's reign
    - A daughter (married to Esen Buqa Güregen, son of Noqai Yarghuchi)
    - Khabash – posthumous son
- El Agachi – a lady from the Khongirad tribe; from camp of Dokuz Khatun
  - Hulachu (executed by Arghun in October 1289)
    - Suleiman (executed with his father)
    - Kuchuk (died in infancy after a long illness)
    - Khoja (died in infancy)
    - Qutluq Buqa (died in infancy)
    - 3 daughters
  - Shiba'uchi (d. Winter 1282)
- Irqan Agachi (Tribe unknown)
  - Taraghai Khatun – married to Taghai Timur (renamed Musa) of Khongirad (son of Shigu Güregen) and Temülun Khatun (daughter of Genghis Khan)
- Mangligach Agachi (Tribe unknown)
  - Qutluqqan Khatun – married firstly to Yesu Buqa Güregen, son of Urughtu Noyan of the Dörben tribe, married secondly Tukel, son of Yesu Buqa
- A concubine from Qutui Khatun's camp:
  - Toqai Timur (d. 1289)
    - Qurumushi
    - Hajji

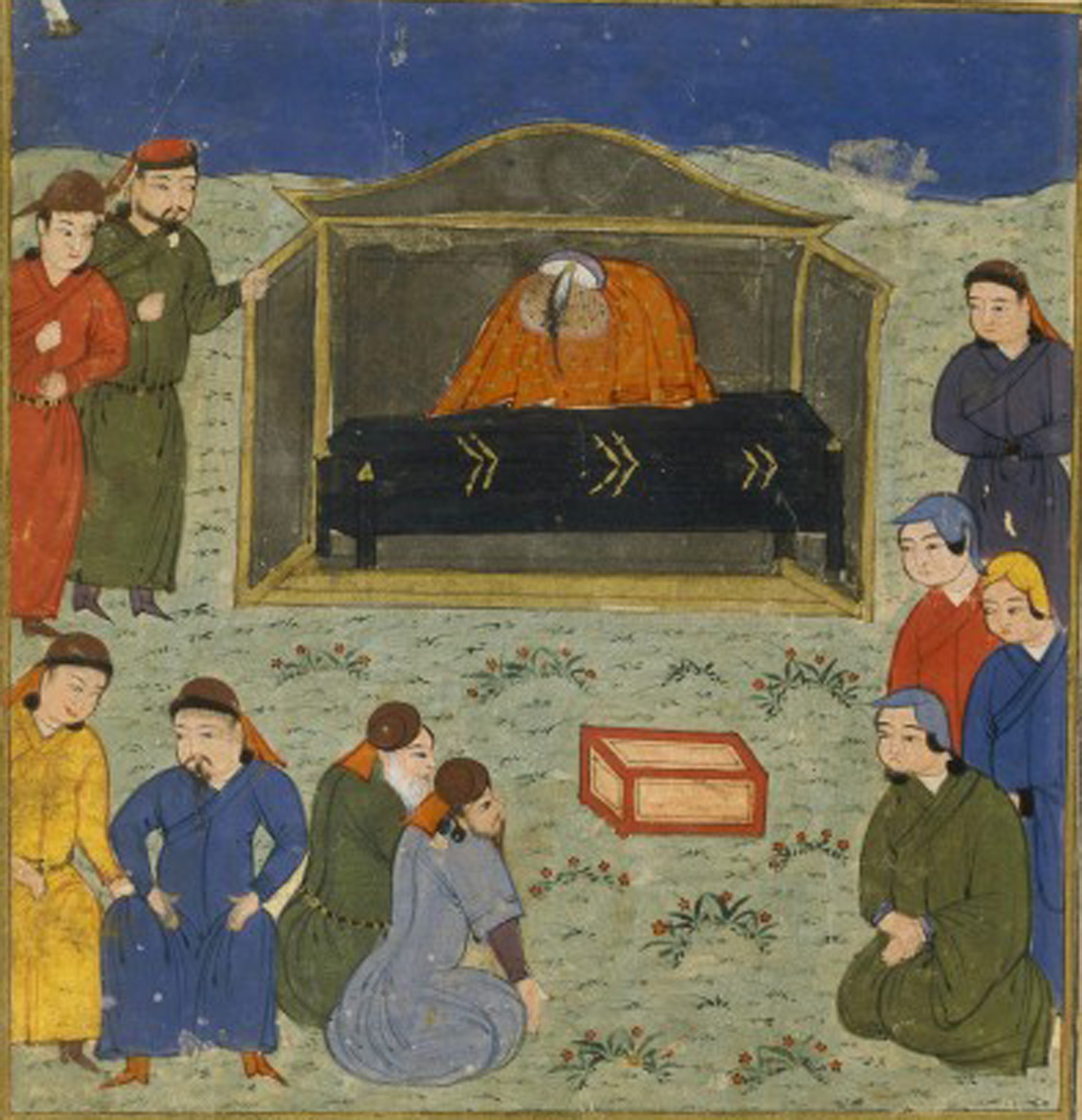
The funeral of Hulegu (Bibliothèque nationale de France)

== Death ==
Hulegu Khan fell seriously ill in January 1265 and died the following month on the banks of Zarrineh River (then called Jaghatu) and was buried on Shahi Island in Lake Urmia. His funeral was the only Ilkhanate funeral to feature human sacrifice. His tomb has never been found.

== Assessment ==
Hülegü's historical legacy is complex, combining exceptionally destructive military conquest with the establishment of a durable Mongol state in Iran and Mesopotamia. He was dispatched westward by his brother, the Great Khan Möngke, to extend Mongol authority over the remaining independent powers of western Asia, and his campaigns resulted in the destruction of the Nizari Ismaili state, the overthrow of the Abbasid Caliphate at Baghdad in 1258, and the Mongol conquest of much of Syria before the Mongol advance was checked by the Mamluk Sultanate at Ain Jalut. The destruction accompanying these campaigns, particularly the sack of Baghdad and the termination of the Abbasid caliphate there, gave Hülegü an especially negative reputation in much of later Muslim historical memory; modern scholarship has noted that he could be portrayed, particularly outside the Ilkhanid realm, as one of the great destroyers of Islam.

His rule nevertheless had consequences extending beyond military destruction. Hülegü established the political foundations of the Ilkhanate, the Mongol-ruled state that dominated Iran and Mesopotamia for much of the following century. The emerging Ilkhanid state increasingly relied upon indigenous administrative elites and institutions to govern its predominantly sedentary territories, beginning a process through which Mongol rule became integrated with the political and cultural traditions of Iran. Hülegü himself employed the Persian administrator Shams al-Din Juvayni as sahib-divan, while his brother, the historian Ata-Malik Juvayni, governed Baghdad and was involved in repairing damage caused by the conquest. Hülegü was also an important patron of Nasir al-Din al-Tusi, for whom the Maragheh observatory was established, and his court included scholars concerned with astronomy and other sciences.

Consequently, historians distinguish the immediate devastation caused by Hülegü's conquests from the political and cultural development of the state that emerged from them. His campaigns destroyed established political institutions and caused severe demographic and material losses in several conquered regions, while the regime he founded subsequently contributed to the formation of a new political order in Iran in which Mongol and Persian administrative and cultural traditions increasingly interacted. His legacy therefore encompasses both the violence of the Mongol conquest of western Asia and his role as the founder of an Ilkhanid state whose institutions, patronage and increasing accommodation with the society it ruled had lasting consequences for medieval Iran.

=== Assessment of religious attitude ===
Hülegü's attitude toward Islam has been interpreted in different ways. His campaigns had particularly severe consequences for major Muslim political and religious institutions: he destroyed the Nizari Ismaili state, overthrew the Abbasid Caliphate in the sack of Baghdad, conquered Muslim Syria, and subsequently sought to defeat the Mamluk Sultanate. Muslim writers consequently sometimes attributed anti-Muslim sentiments to Hülegü and the Mongols, particularly because the conquest ended the privileged political position previously enjoyed by Islam. Encyclopaedia Iranica, however, notes that Hülegü's religious position was more complex: his sympathy toward Christians was clear, but may have reflected the influence of his Christian wife Doquz Khatun as well as traditional Mongol religious tolerance or ambivalence.

Evidence nevertheless exists that Hülegü was willing to present his conflict with Muslim powers in explicitly religious terms. In a Latin letter sent in 1262 to Louis IX of France in connection with proposed cooperation against the Mamluk Sultanate, Hülegü's communication described the Mongol objective in strongly anti-Muslim religious language and presented Muslims as common enemies of the Mongols and the Christian West. Peter Jackson likewise discusses the embassy in the context of Hülegü's attempts to secure cooperation with Western Christian powers. Such rhetoric provides evidence for an anti-Muslim dimension to Hülegü's diplomacy, although its context as an appeal for Christian cooperation against the Mamluks makes it difficult to determine from the correspondence alone the extent to which it represented Hülegü's personal religious convictions.

His policies were not, however, consistently directed against Muslims as a religious community. Hülegü employed and patronized prominent Muslims, including Nasir al-Din al-Tusi, Shams al-Din Juvayni and Ata-Malik Juvayni, the latter becoming governor of Baghdad and participating in its reconstruction after the Mongol conquest. His religious identity was itself distinct from both Christianity and Islam: evidence of his adherence to or strong interest in Buddhism includes the construction of a Buddhist temple at Khoy, while traditional Mongol religious practices remained evident at his death.

Modern scholarship therefore presents a more complicated picture than either depicting Hülegü as religiously neutral or characterizing his campaigns simply as a war against Islam. His conquests dismantled some of the most important Muslim political institutions of the period; Christians received favorable treatment in certain circumstances; and his diplomacy with Christian Europe could employ explicitly anti-Muslim rhetoric. At the same time, Muslims continued to occupy important positions under his government and Muslim intellectuals received his patronage. The available evidence consequently supports distinguishing Hülegü's hostility toward particular Muslim powers and his occasional anti-Muslim religious rhetoric from the stronger claim that his government pursued a general policy of persecuting Muslims solely because of their religion.

== Legacy ==
Hulegu Khan laid the foundations of the Ilkhanate and thus paved the way for the later Safavid dynastic state, and ultimately the modern country of Iran. Hulegu's conquests also opened Iran to both European influence from the west and Buddhist influence from the east. Thus, combined with patronage from his successors, would develop Iran's distinctive excellence in architecture. Under Hulegu's dynasty, Iranian historians began writing in Persian rather than Arabic. It is recorded however that he converted to Buddhism as he neared death, against the will of Doquz Khatun. The erection of a Buddhist temple at Ḵoy testifies his interest in that religion. Recent translations of various Tibetan monks' letters and epistles to Hulegu confirms that he was a lifelong Buddhist, following the Kagyu school.

Hulegu patronized Nasir al-Din Tusi and supported the establishment of the Maragheh observatory. He also employed the Juvayni brothers: Shams al-Din Juvayni served as sahib-divan, while Ata-Malik Juvayni governed Baghdad and participated in repairing damage caused by the Mongol conquest.

== In popular media ==
- Portrayed by Kurt Katch in Ali Baba and the Forty Thieves (1944)
- Portrayed by Pran in the 1956 Indian film Halaku.
- Portrayed by Öztürk Serengil in Cengiz Han'ın Hazineleri (1962)
- Portrayed by Zhang Jingda and Zhang Bolun in The Legend of Kublai Khan (2013)

== See also ==
- List of Mongol rulers

== Notes ==
Language notes

General notes

Regnal titles
Preceded by none	Ilkhan; 1256–1265	Succeeded by Abaqa Khan
