= Doquz Khatun =

Keraite princess and consort to Hulegu (died 1265)

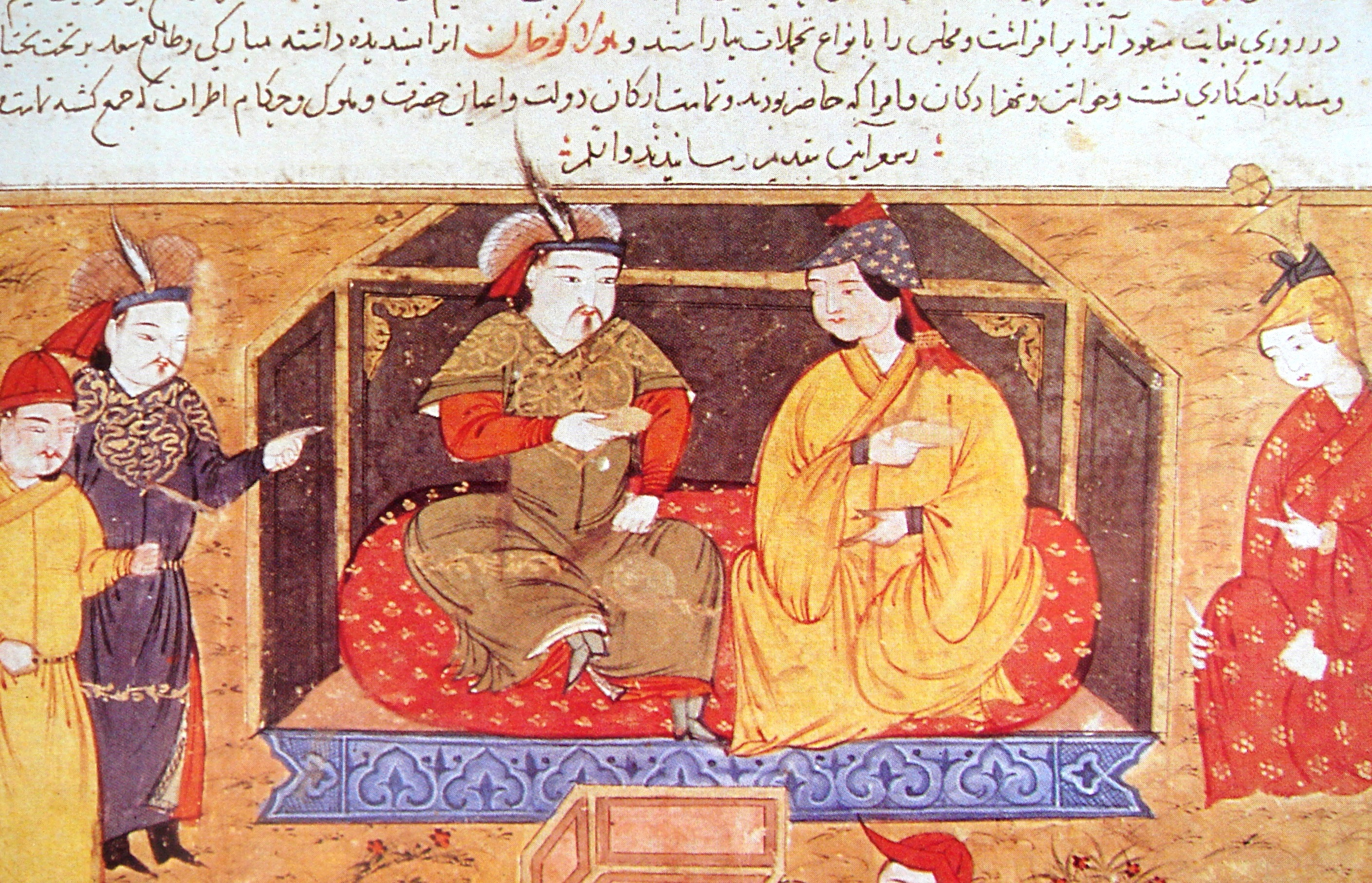
- Hulagu Khan and Doquz Khatun

Khatun of the Ilkhanate
- Tenure: 1256 – 8 February 1265
- Next: Buluqhan Khatun
- Died: 16 June 1265
- Consort: Hulagu Khan
- House: Keraites
- Father: Uyku
- Religion: Eastern Christianity

Doquz Khatun (also spelled Dokuz Khatun) (died 1265) was a princess of the Keraites who was married to Hulagu Khan; her husband was the founder of the Ilkhanate and a grandson of Genghis Khan.

== Life ==
Doquz Khatun was possibly a granddaughter of the Keraite khan Toghrul, through his son Uyku or Abaqu. She was at first given to Genghis Khan and Börte's youngest son Tolui following the demise of her grandfather. After his death in 1232, she was wed to Hulagu, her step-son in levirate marriage. She was known to accompany Hulagu on campaigns. At the Siege of Baghdad (1258), the Mongols massacred tens of thousands of inhabitants, but through the influence of Doquz, the Christians were spared.

Some sources indicate that Doquz Khatun was an Assyrian by origin, who adhered the Church of the East, and is often mentioned as a great benefactor of the Christian faith. When Mongol envoys were sent to Europe, they also tried to use Doquz's Christianity to their advantage, by claiming that Mongol princesses such as Doquz and her aunt Sorghaghtani Beki were daughters of the legendary Prester John.

Doquz Khatun was a supporter of her step-son Abaqa and retained her influential position even after the death of her husband. She secured succession of Denha I to patriarchal throne of Church of the East in her capacity. She died on 16 June 1265, 4 months after her husband. Stepanos Orbelian later claimed that she was poisoned by Shams al-Din Juvayni.

== See also ==
- Christianity among the Mongols
