= Khwajeh Jalal al-Din Turanshah =

14th-century statesman and governor

Khwajeh Jalal al-Din Turanshah was a 14th-century statesman, who served the Muzaffarids, initially as a governor, then statesman of its incumbent monarch, Shah Shoja Mozaffari (r. 1358–1384).

Of obscure origins, Turanshah first appears in records as the Muzaffarid governor of Abarkuh. In 1364, after Shah Shoja had lost Shiraz to his brother Shah Mahmud and the latter's allies–the Jalayirid Sultanate–he retreated to Kerman. En route, he crossed Abarkuh, where Turanshah joined him and attempted to supply him as much as possible. For the subsequent year, Turanshah followed Shah Shoja in his troublesome expeditions in Kerman, where he had to reassemble his forces in order to retake Shiraz from his brother.

Turanshahs loyalty to a ruler in hardship earned him his faith and appreciation, which was followed by an appointment to the office of minister in 1369, after Shah Shoja had previously had one minister jailed and the subsequent killed. Turanshah is known to have been an avid supporters of poetry and arts. He supported the prominent Persian poet Hafez, who commended him in many of poems. Shah Shoja died in 1384, with Turanshah following him not long after, dying after six months, in 1385.

Hafez paid homage to Turanshah in the following lyrics:

Turanshah, the Asef of the age, the spirit of the world,
Who planted nothing but the seeds of charity on this earth,
Rose to paradise and the stove of heaven
In the middle of the week, on the twenty-first of Safar.
Whoever desires truth and righteousness,
Seek the year of his death from the words “in search of heaven”

== Sources ==
- Limbert, John (2004). Shiraz in the Age of Hafez. University of Washington Press. pp. 1–182. ISBN 9780295802886.
