= Shah Mahmud (Muzaffarid) =

Shah Mahmud شاه محمود
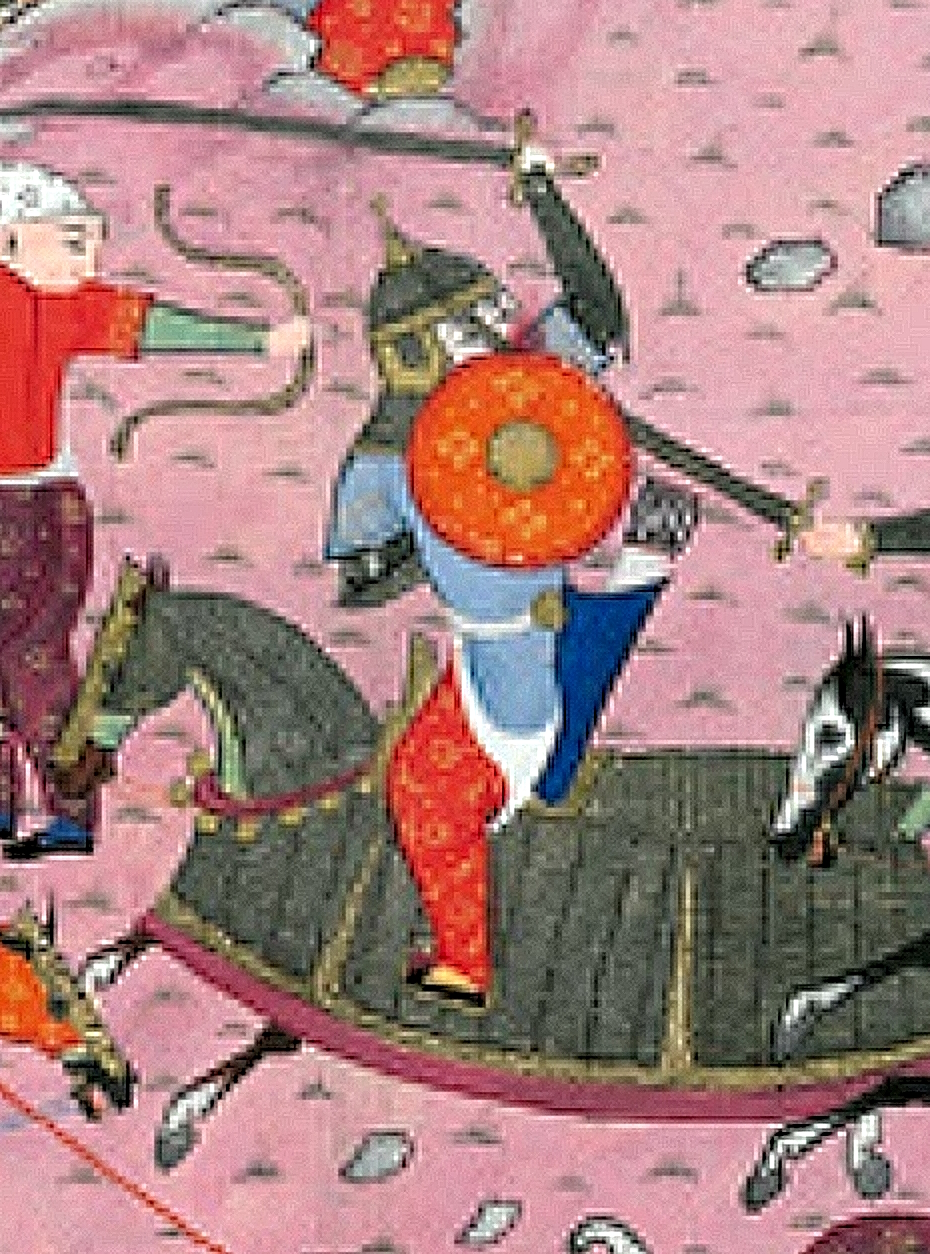
- Shah Mahmud (detail) in a battle with his brother, the Muzaffarid ruler Shah Shuja. Khvandamir, Ḥabībuʾs-Siyar, 1592. Istanbul, Süleymaniye Kütüphanesi, Hekimoğlu Ali Paşa, 738, fol. 155r

Shah of the Muzaffarid dynasty (In Isfahan)
- Reign: 1364–1366
- Opposing: Shah Shoja
- Died: 1375
- Dynasty: Muzaffarid
- Father: Mubariz al-Din Muhammad
- Mother: Makhdum Shah
- Religion: Sunni Islam

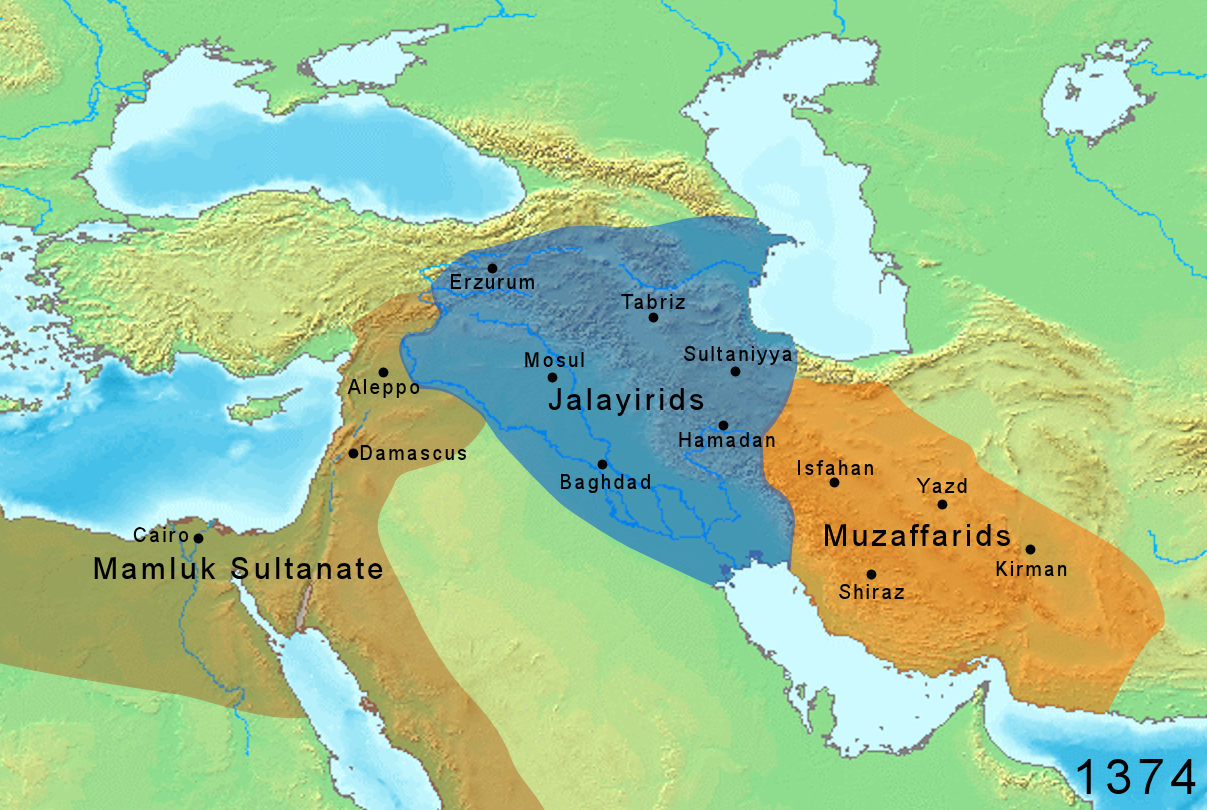
The Jalayirid state at its greatest territorial extent and the Muzaffarids in 1374, and the end of Shah Mahmud's life, and before the Timurid invasions

Shah Mahmud (died 1375) was a pretender to the throne and a short-time ruler of the Muzaffarids in the 14th century. He was a brother of Shah Shoja Mozaffari, and one of his main rivals.

Shah Mahmud was a son of the Muzaffarid ruler Mubariz al-Din Muhammad and the Khitan princess Khatun Qotlogh Beg, better known as Makhdum Shah, daughter of the Qutlugh-Khanids ruler Qutb al-Din Shah Jahan. His paternal grandmother was almost certainly Mongol.

Upon acceding to the Muzaffarid throne in Fars in 1358, Shah Shoja gave Isfahan to his first brother Shah Mahmud, and Kerman to another brother Shah Ahmad, while he captured and imprisoned Shah Yahya who was soon released and sent to Yazd.

In 1363, Shah Shoja marched against his first brother Shah Mahmud, although a peace was soon brokered. In the following year however in 1364, Shah Mahmud, with the support of his father-in-law Shaikh Awais Jalayir of the Jalayirids, invaded Fars and captured Shiraz, taking the Muzaffarid throne. In effect, Shah Mahmud acknowledged the sovereignty of Shaikh Awais Jalayir, who in turn recognized Shah Mahmud's control of Isfahan and Shiraz. Shah Shoja would not be able to reconquer his capital for the next three years, until 1367.

Shah Mahmud would continue to play an influential role in Iranian politics, using his marriage alliance to claim Tabriz from the Jalayirids after Shaikh Awais Jalayir died in 1374. Shah Mahmud challenged his brother-in-law Shaikh Hussain Jalayir's claim to his father's inheritance, and he occupied the city of Tabriz. But he soon had to give up after he was struck by illness. He died the next year in 1375, allowing Shah Shoja to recover some stability and to occupy Isfahan.

Shah Shuja recovered Isfahan, and in turn attempted to invade Azerbaijan. He successfully advanced on Tabriz, but he too had to give up because of the unstable situation in Fars, and a revolt of his nephew Shah Yahya in Isfahan. Shah Shuja settled for an alliance with Husain, by marrying his son Zain al-'AbidIn to a sister of Husain. The Jalayirids nevertheless stroke back, but were stopped in Sultaniyya.

Preceded by Shah Shoja	Muzaffarid ruler 1364–1366	Succeeded by Shah Shoja
