= Soltan Bakht Agha Mausoleum =

Islamic mausoleum in Isfahan, Iran

- مقبره سلطان بخت آقا
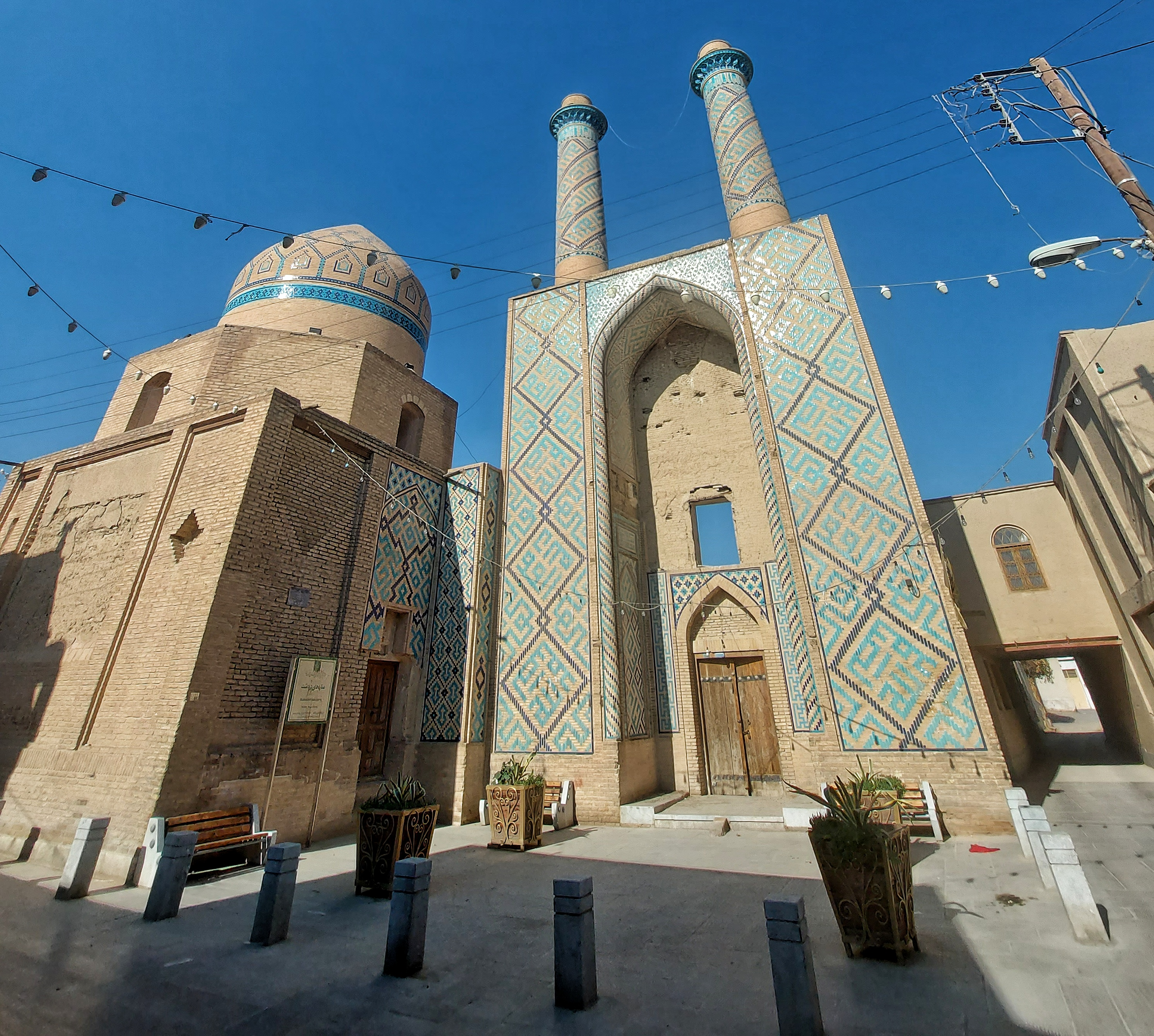
- The mausoleum with minarets in 2023

- Location of the complex in Iran

Religion
- Affiliation: Islam
- Ecclesiastical or organisational status: Mausoleum
- Status: Active

Location
- Location: Esfahan, Isfahan province
- Country: Iran
- Interactive map of Soltan Bakht Agha Mausoleum
- Coordinates: 32°40′11″N 51°40′55″E

Architecture
- Type: Islamic architecture
- Style: Azari; Ilkhanid
- Founder: Shah Shoja Mozaffari
- Completed: 1375 CE

Specifications
- Dome: One
- Minaret: Two
- Minaret height: 15 m (49 ft)
- Materials: Bricks; mortar; tiles
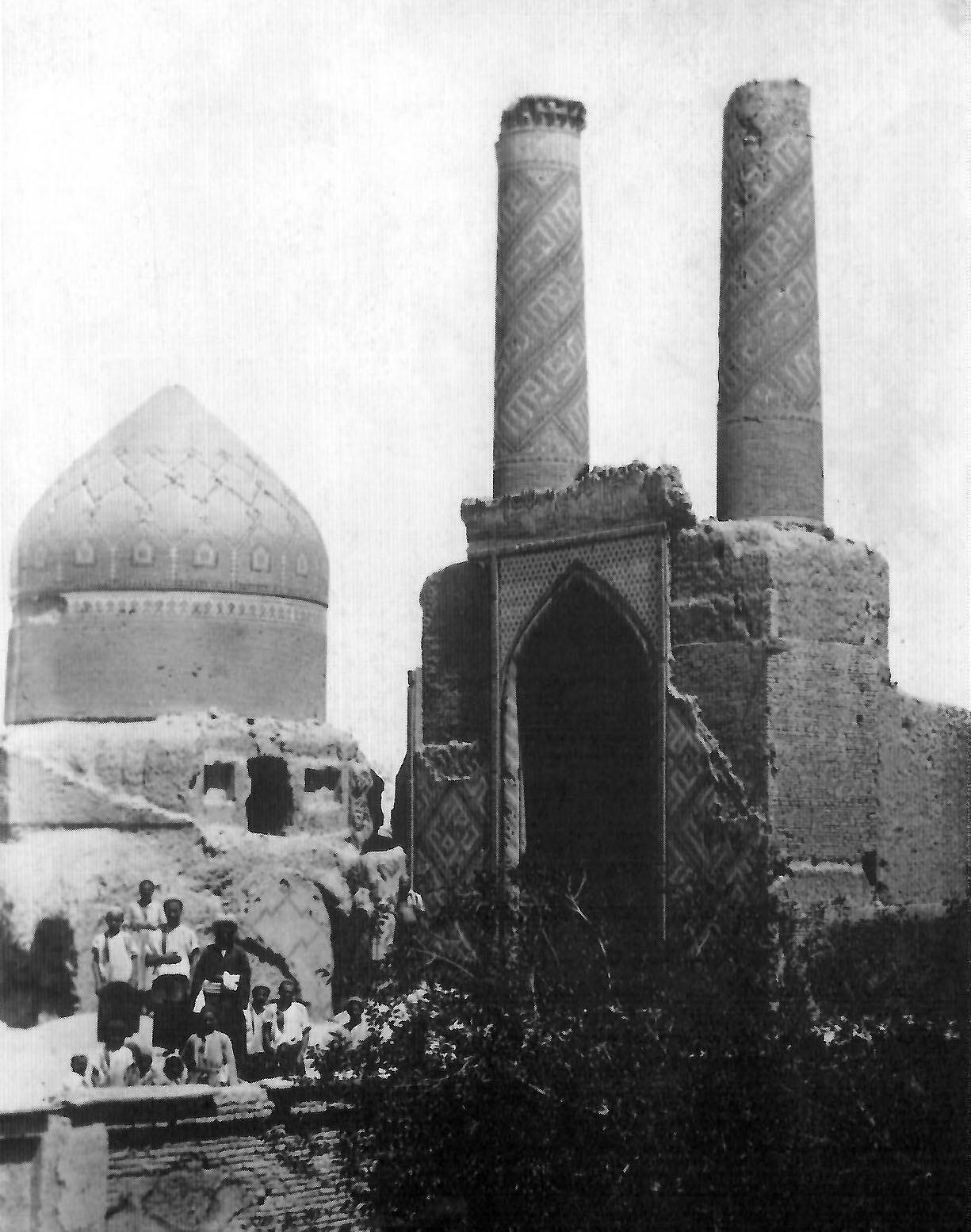
- The mausoleum of Soltan Bakht Agha in 1870

Iran National Heritage List
- Official name: Dardasht Minarets
- Type: Mausoleum/Minarets
- Designated: 1932
- Reference no.: 115
- Conservation organization: Cultural Heritage, Handicrafts and Tourism Organization of Iran

The Soltan Bakht Agha Mausoleum (Persian: مقبره سلطان بخت آقا) is a mausoleum located in the city of Esfahan, in the province of Isfahan, Iran. The mausoleum complex entombs the remains of Soltan Bakht Agha, the niece of the Injuid ruler, Abu Ishaq Inju.

The complex includes the Dardasht Minarets (Persian: مناره های دردشت, romanized: Du Manar Dardasht), that were added to the Iran National Heritage List on 6 January 1932, administered by the Cultural Heritage, Handicrafts and Tourism Organization of Iran.

== Soltan Bakht Agha ==
Soltan Bakht Agha (Persian: مقبره سلطان بخت آقا) was the niece of the last Injuid ruler, Abu Ishaq Inju. After Abu Ishaq Inju was executed by the Muzaffarid ruler, Mubariz al-Din Muhammad, in the year 1357, Soltan Bakht Agha decided to marry his son, Shah Mahmud Mozaffari so that she could cause disruptions and dissent amongst the Muzaffarid princes, as retribution for the execution of her beloved uncle. She was assisted in her task by Shah Shoja Mozaffari, the brother of Shah Mahmud. Eventually, Shah Mahmud found out about her plot, and she was executed by him as well in the same year.

== History ==
The mausoleum was constructed in 1375 CE by Shah Shoja Mozaffari, who conquered Isfahan after the imprisonment of Mubariz al-Din Muhammad. He ordered a mausoleum to be built as a way to honour her bravery. It is also suggested that it was built on an earlier structure dating back to Shah Mahmud's rule. There was also a madrasah present at some point of time, but that is all gone in the modern age.

== Architecture ==
The building is made out of brick. The dome over the mausoleum is decorated with turquoise and azure tiles. The rest of the mausoleum is coated with a layer of plaster. All the decorations on the walls have faded off after many years.

The pair of Dardasht minarets are made of bricks and they flank the iwan leading to the mausoleum. Each minaret is 15 metres (49 ft) tall, and decorated with several of the 99 names of Allah in the Kufic way.

== Gallery ==
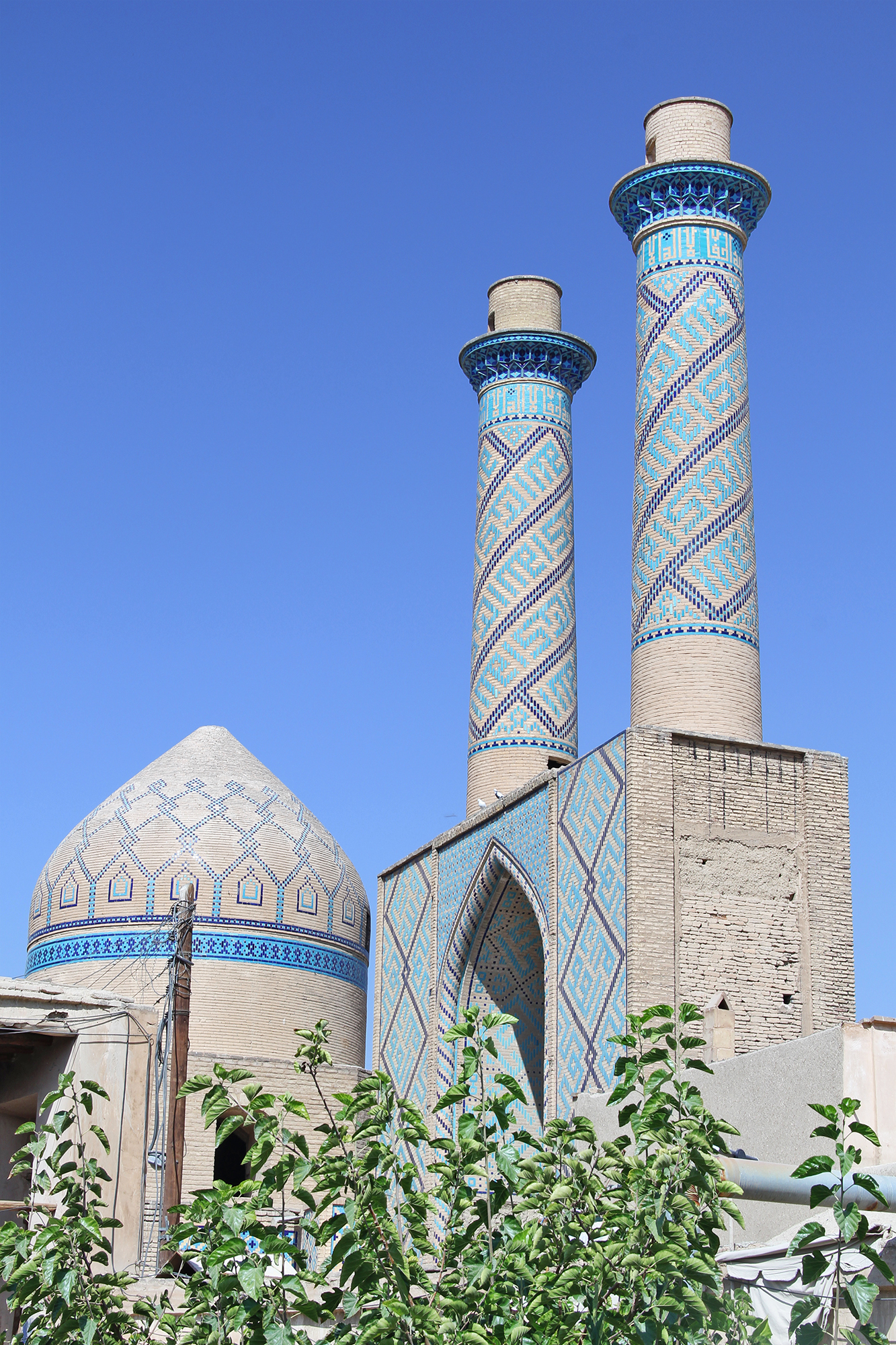
A general view of the mausoleum

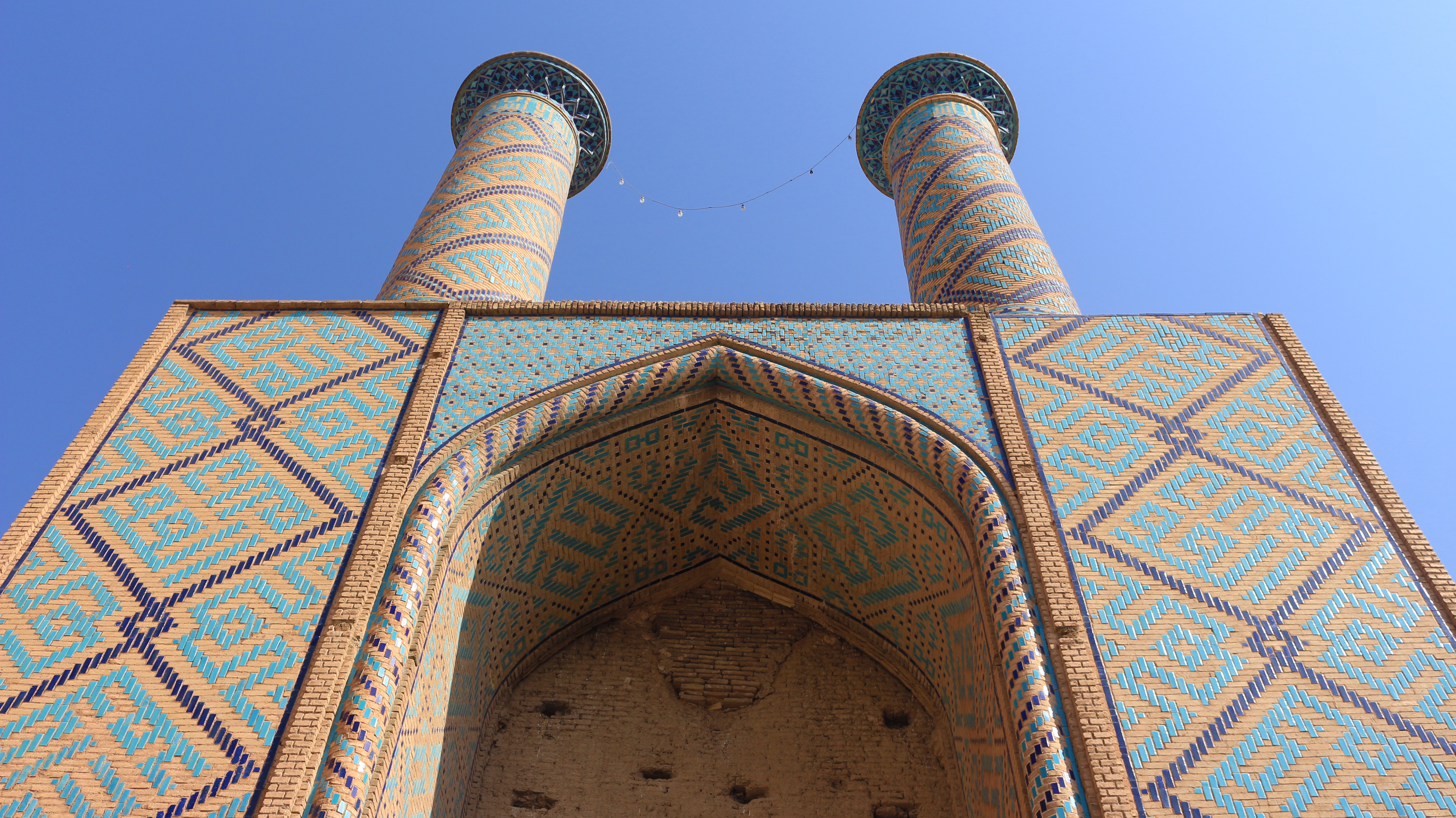
A close-up of the iwan and the two minarets flanking it

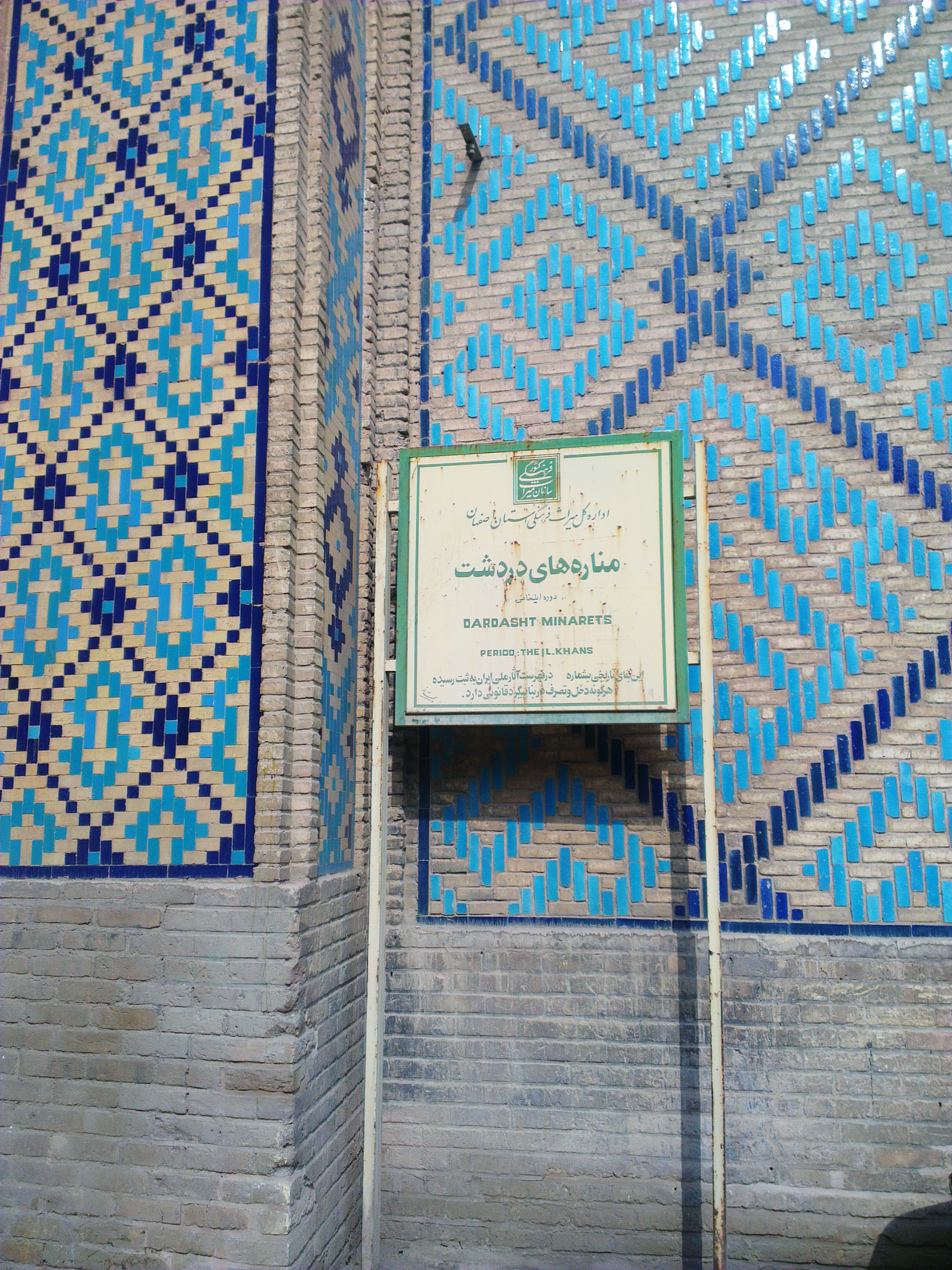
A noticeboard outside the building, mistakenly (Note: The Ilkhanid period was dissolved by the time the mausoleum was constructed.) ascribing the origin during the Ilkhanid period

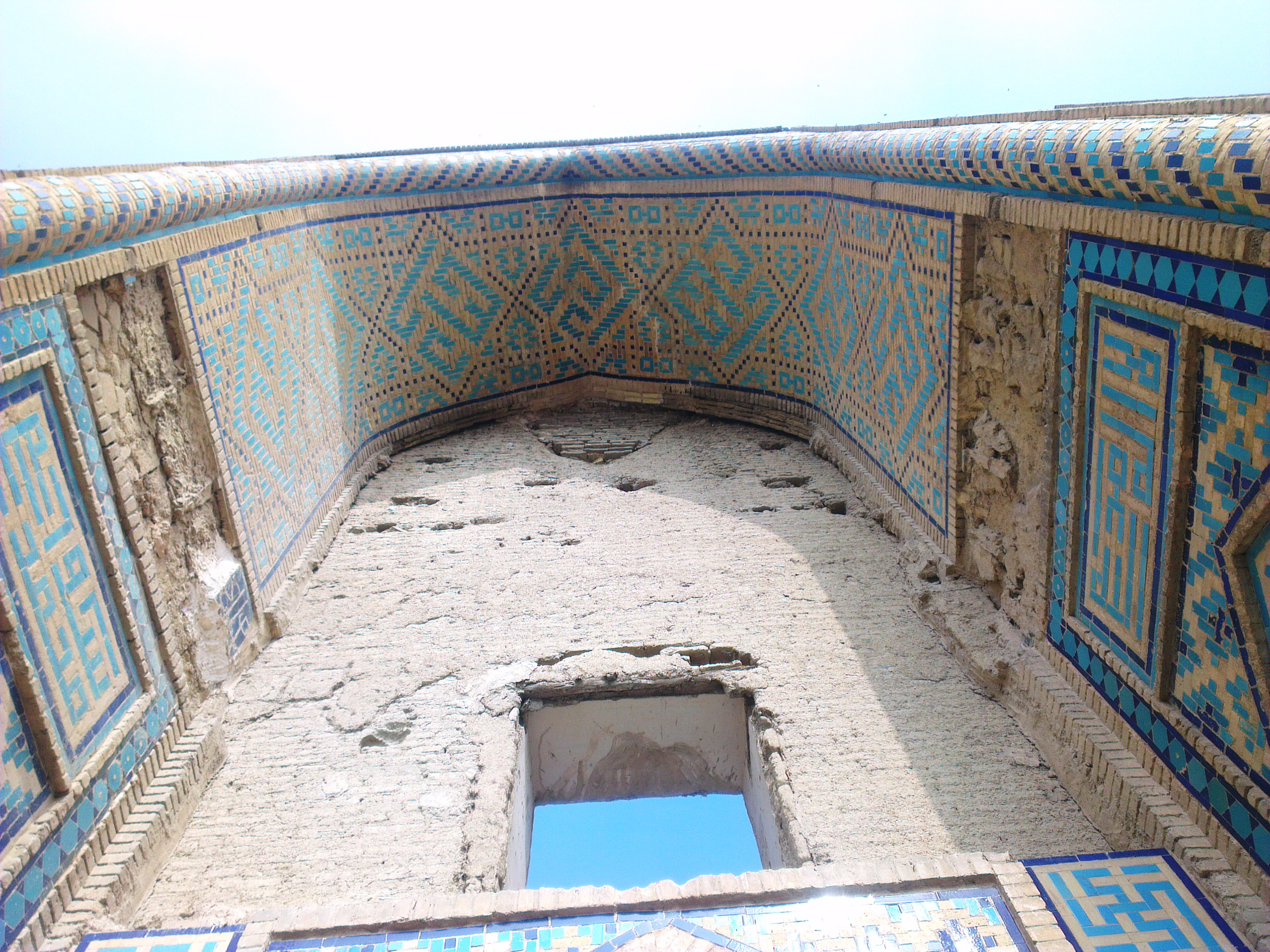
Some detailing underneath the main iwan

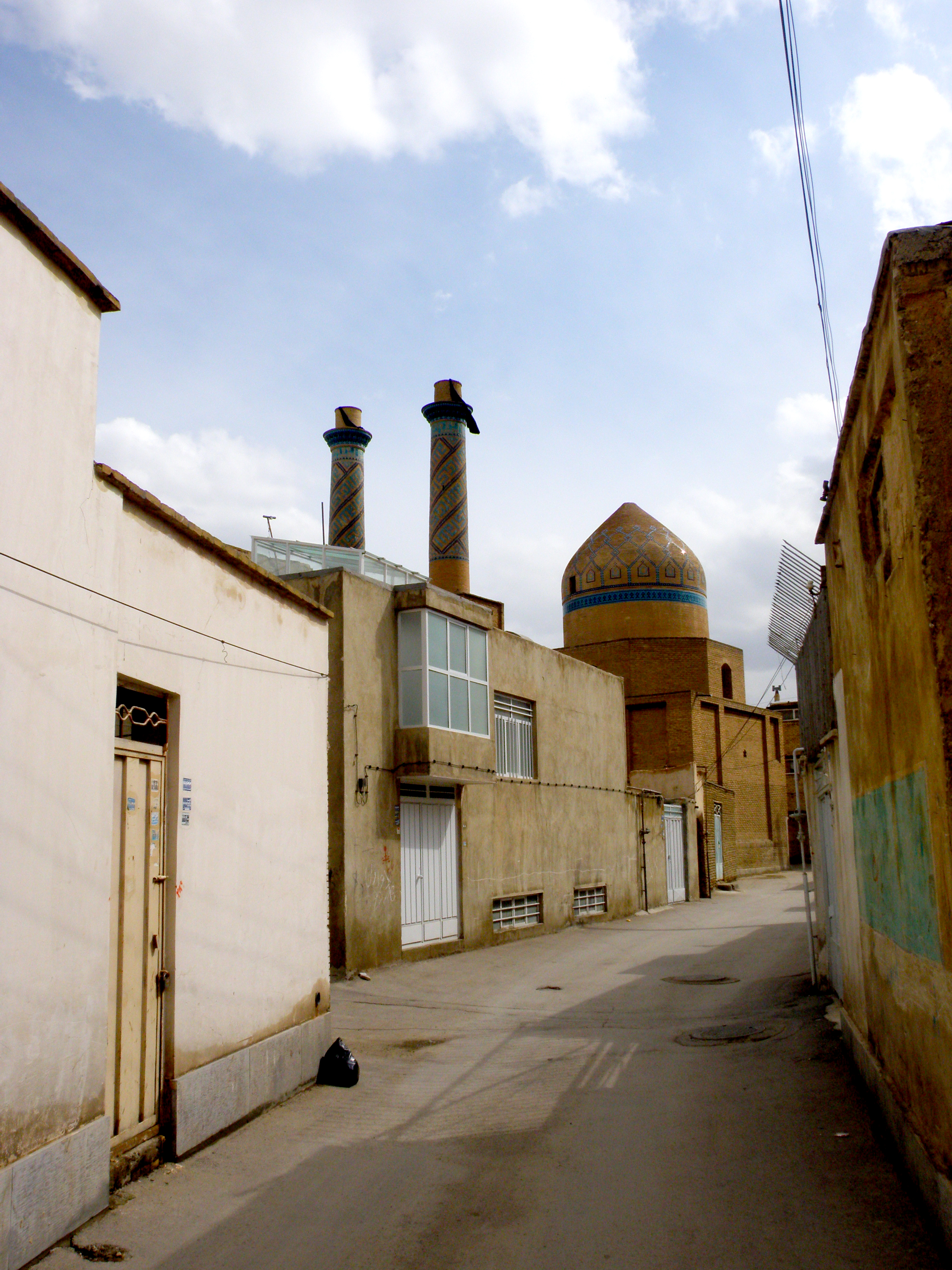
The mausoleum viewed from Jafarian street, Ebn-e Sina district

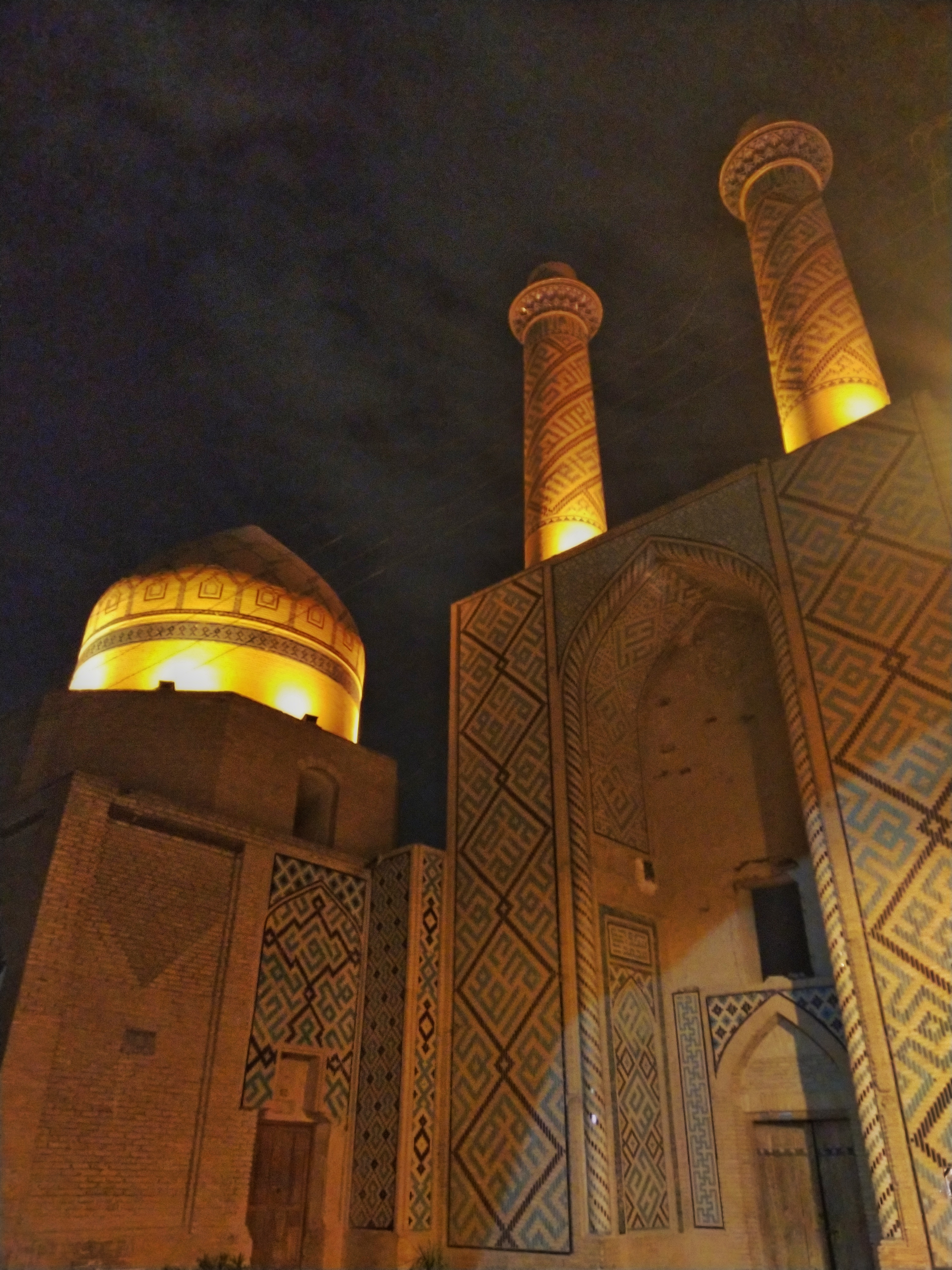
The mausoleum at night

== See also ==
- List of historical structures in Isfahan
- List of mausoleums in Iran
