= Shah Shuja =

Shāh Shujā' (Persian: شاه شجاع, meaning: brave king) may refer to the following:

- Shah Shoja Mozaffari, the 14th-century Muzaffarid ruler of Southern Iran
- Shah Shuja (Mughal prince) (1616-1661), the second son of Shah Jahan
- Shah Shuja Durrani, emir of Afghanistan in 1803–1809 and 1839-1842
