= Zain al-Abidin (Muzaffarid) =

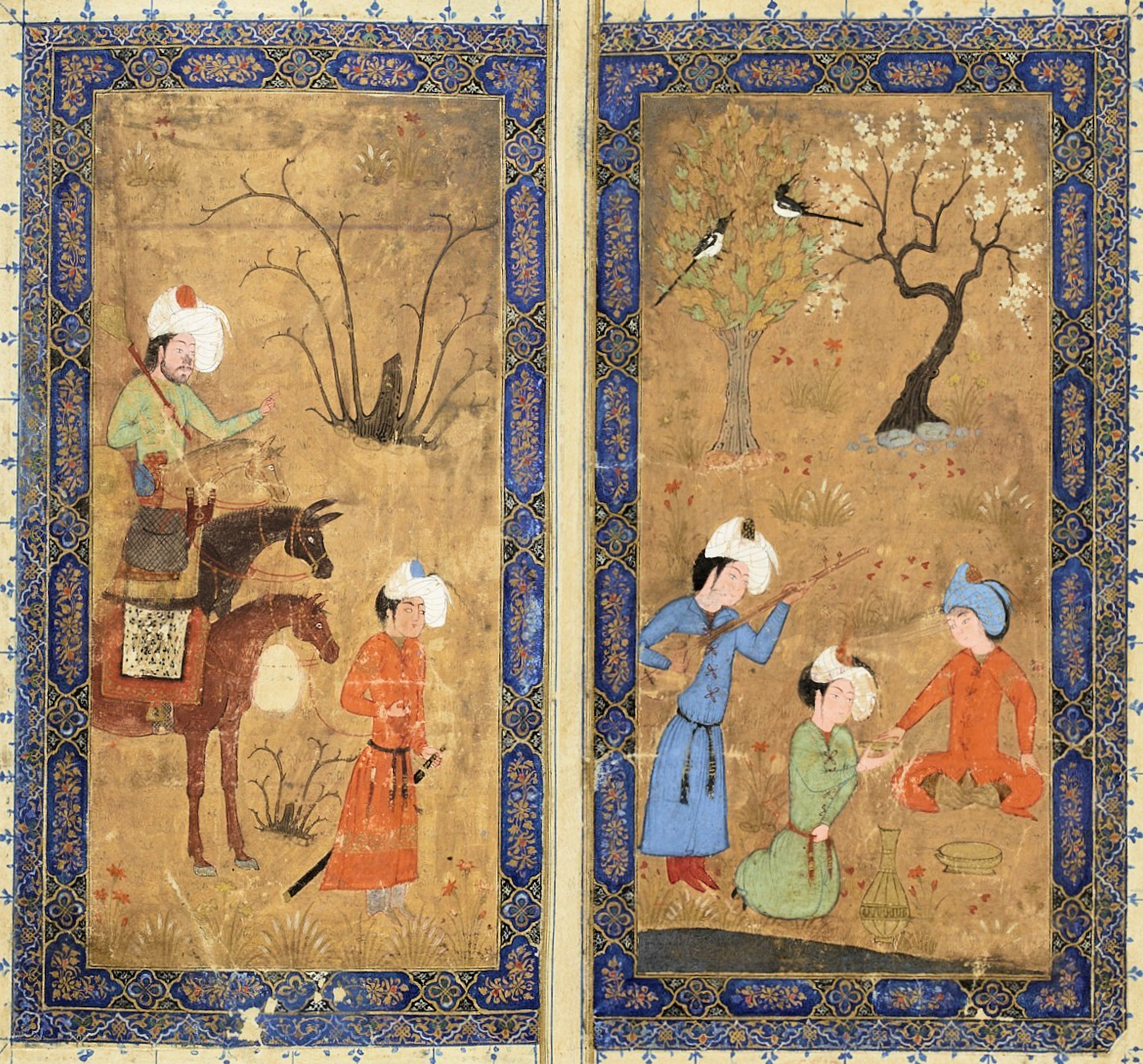
- Contemporary frontispiece with Prince and attendants, probably circa 1390, final Muzaffarid period, Shiraz. Kalila and Dimna, BNF Persan 377.

Shah of the Muzaffarid dynasty
- Reign: 1384–1387
- Predecessor: Shah Shoja
- Successor: Shah Yahya
- Dynasty: Muzaffarid
- Father: Shah Shoja
- Mother: A Mongol princess
- Religion: Sunni Islam

Zain al-Abidin (ruled 1384–1387, died several years after 1393) was a ruler of the Muzaffarids following the death of his father Shah Shoja. He was the eldest son of Shah Shoja. His mother was the daughter of one of the tribal Mongol chieftains who roamed the region of Kerman and were important allies of the Muzaffarids, from the non-Muslim Mongol tribes of Kerman, the Avḡāni and Jormāʾi.

Before his death, Shah Shoja had sent a letter to Timur, asking him to protect his dynasty. Timur distrusted the intentions of the Muzaffarids, and weary of having a potential enemy to the southwest, decided to attack and take control of the Muzaffarids. He sent a letter to the new ruler Zain al-Abidin demanding his submission, but the letter remained without a response.

== Life as a prince ==
In 1359, Shah Shoja occupied Azerbaijan and Arran for four months, briefly capturing Tabriz, the capital city of the Jalayirids. he was forced to turn back when internal conditions in Fars deteriorated: his second brother Shah Muzaffar's son, Shah Yahya, had risen in revolt in Isfahan. Shah Shoja had to make peace with the Jalayirids, and offered to marry his son Zain al-Abidin to a sister of the Jalayirid ruler Shaikh Hussain Jalayir. The Jalayirids refused the offer and invaded, although Shah Shoja managed to prevent them from getting any further than Soltaniyeh.

== First Timurid offensive (1387) ==
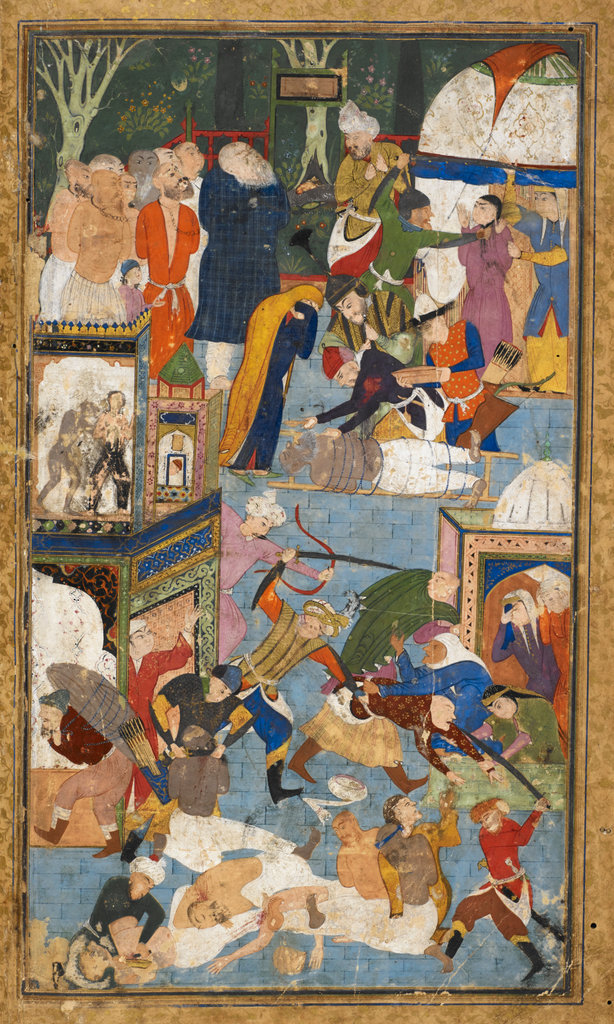
The Sacking of Isfahan (1387), by Timur. Timurnama, Bukhara (mid 16th century)

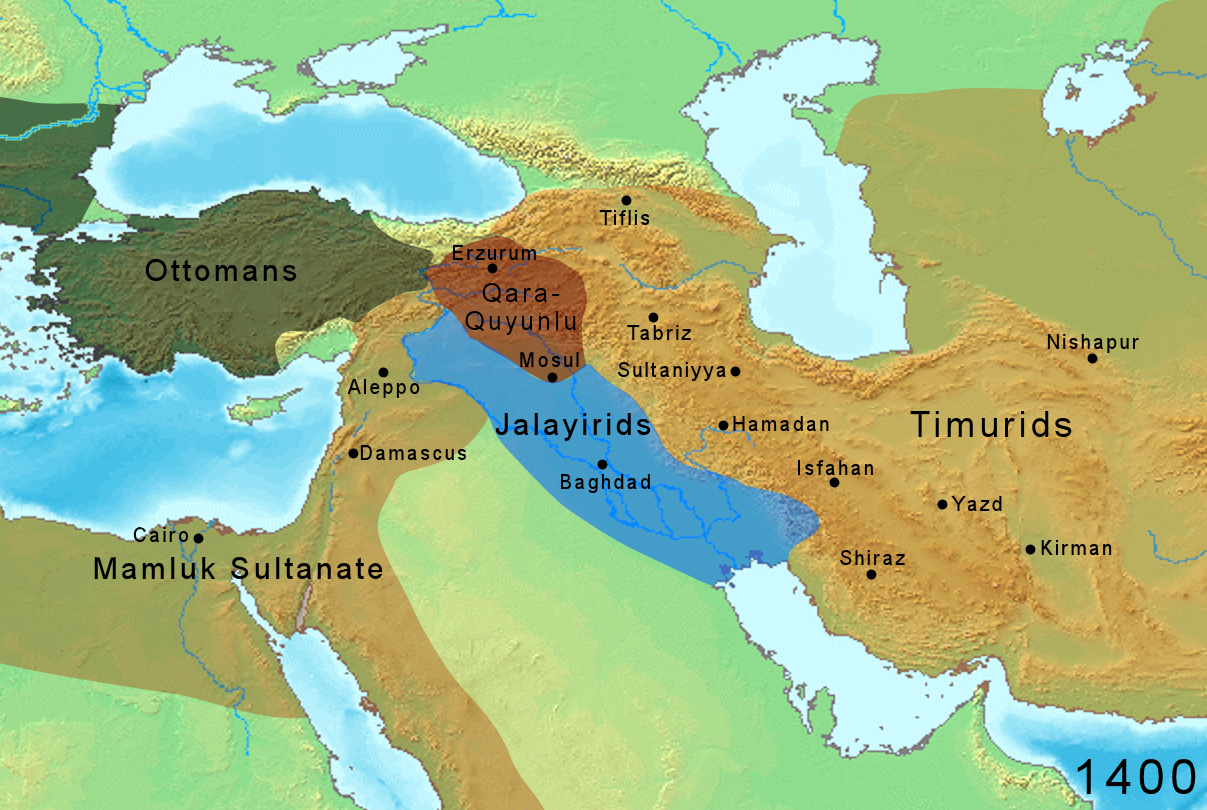
After the Timurid destruction of the Muzaffarids: Jalayirid, Qara Qoyunlu and Timurid territories in 1400.

In 1387, Timur attacked Isfahan in the Siege of Isfahan (1387). The governor, Muzaffar-i Kashi, gave the keys to the city. When the city revolted against Timurid taxes, Timur ordered a slaughter of the population.

Zain al-Abidin fled to his capital Shiraz, with the intent of reaching Baghdad. On the way, he was imprisoned by his brother Shah Mansur. Timur easily captured Shiraz. Shah Mansur then submitted to Timur, and Timur installed in Shiraz Nusrat al-DIn Shah Yahya, a nephew of Shah Shoja. Timur left for Tansoxonia, to face an incursion by Tokhtamish.

Shah Mansur tried to reinstate the Muzaffarid state and managed to recapture Shiraz, from which Shah Yahya fled, but failed to take Isfahan. In contrast, Zain al-'Abidin managed to escape and was welcomed by the population of Isfahan. He tried to form an alliance against Shah Mansur, but he was defeated in battle. When trying to flee into Khurasan, he was captured by the local ruler Musa Jaukar, who remitted him to Shah Mansur, who had him imprisoned and blinded in Qal'a-yi Safid.

== Second Timurid offensive (1392-93) ==
Timur returned from Transoxonia in 1392, to start a new five-year campaign against Iran. Shah Mansur prepared to face him from his base in Shiraz. As he advanced, Timur freed prince Zain al-'Abidln from imprisonment in Qal'a-yi Safld, and treated him benevolently, promising to punish Shah Mansur. Shah Mansur fought the Timurid forces, but was defeated and decapitated by the forces of prince Shah Rukh.

All remaining Muzaffarids proclaimed submission to Timur, but on May 1393 in Qumisha, south of Isfahan, Timur issued a supreme order for all of them to be executed. Only two Muzaffarids were spared: Zain al-'Abidln and Sultan Shibli, the eldest and the youngest sons of Shah Shoja, who were sent to the Timurid capital of Samarqand. They were reportedly provided with comfortable resources and enjoyed a pleasant life in Samarkand. Numerous men of letters and artists from Fars and Irak also resettled in Samarkand.

== Sources ==
- The Cambridge history of Iran: Vol. 6: Timurid and Safavid periods. Cambridge: Cambridge University Press. 2008. ISBN 9781139054980.
- Limbert, John W. (2011). Shiraz in the Age of Hafez: The Glory of a Medieval Persian City. University of Washington Press. pp. 1–192. ISBN 9780295802886.
- Wing, Patrick (2014). "Mozaffarids". Encyclopaedia Iranica.
