= Muzaffarids (Iran) =

Medieval Muslim dynasty in Iran (14th century CE)

- 1314–1393
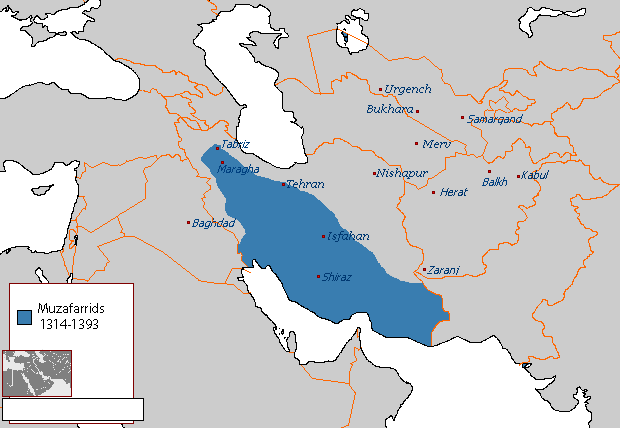
- Map of the Muzaffarid dynasty at its greatest extent
- Capital: Kerman, Shiraz (after 1357)
- Common languages: Arabic (poetry); Persian (poetry)
- Religion: Sunni Islam
- Government: Monarchy
- Shah
  - 1314–1358: Mubariz al-Din (first)
  - 1391–1393: Shah Mansur (last)
- History
  - Established: 1314
  - Disestablished: 1393
Preceded by
Ilkhanate
Injuids
Atabegs of Yazd
Succeeded by
Timurid Empire

The Muzaffarid dynasty (Arabic: آل مظفر; Persian: مظفریان) was a Muslim dynasty that came to power in Iran following the breakup of the Ilkhanate in the 14th century. At their zenith, they ruled a kingdom comprising Iranian Azerbaijan, central Persia, and Persian Iraq.

The Muzaffarids were known for their patronage of Arabic and Persian literature, helping to create Shiraz as a centre of cultural learning. Shah Shoja was a poet and wrote in both Arabic and Persian and was said to be capable of memorizing eight verses of Arabic poetry after hearing them read once. While the Muzaffarid ruler of Kirman, Shah Yahya, commissioned the scholar Junyad bin Mahmud Al-Umari to compile an anthology of Arabic poetry and prose for him.

== Rise to power ==
The Muzaffarids were a dynasty whose ancestors were of Arab origin, (Note: Grousset called the Muzaffarids Arabo-Persian.) (Note: "Their ancestor, Ghiyath al-Din al-Hadjdji, was allegedly a member of an Arab family from Khwaf, in Khurasan.") (Note: Bosworth states that the Muzaffarids were of distant Khurasanian Arab origin.) The dynasty has been described by modern scholars as both Iranian and Persian. Although the Muzaffarids claimed Arab ancestry, modern scholarship notes that the family had lived in Persia since the early Muslim conquest and had become thoroughly Persianized by the time they established their dynasty in the fourteenth century. Their ancestors arrived from Arabia and stayed in Khorasan up until the Mongol invasion of that province, at which point they fled to Yazd. The dynasty was nevertheless closely connected with the Mongols: the mother of Mubariz al-Din Muhammad, the founder of the dynasty, was almost certainly Mongol. His queen was the Khitan princess Qutlughkhan Makdumshah, daughter of Qutb al-Din Shah Jahan, ruler of the Qutlugh-Khanids. His son Shah Shoja's queen was a Mongol princess from one of the non-Muslim Mongol tribes of Kerman, the Avḡāni and Jormāʾi. This union produced three Moẓaffarid princes, as well as the princess Pādšāh Solṭān.

Serving under the Il-Khans, they gained prominence when Sharaf al-Din Muzaffar was made governor of Maibud. He was tasked with crushing the robber-bands that were roaming around the country.

Sharaf al-Din's son, Mubariz al-Din Muhammad, was brought up at the Il-Khan's court but returned to Maibud upon the death of the Il-Khan Öljeitü. In around 1319 he overthrew the atabeg of Yazd and was subsequently recognized as governor of the city by the central Il-Khan government. Following this he began fighting against the Neguderis, a Mongol tribal group. He managed to face this crisis with a minimum of loss.

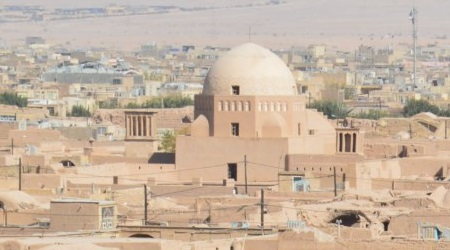
Hasht Dome and Hasht Hussainiya in Yazd (built in 1328)

In the wake of the loss of Il-Khan authority in central Iran following the death of Abu Sa'id Bahadur Khan, Mubariz al-Din continued to carry out his expansionary policy. In 1339 or 1340 he invaded the province of Kirman and seized it from its Mongol governor, Qutb al-Din b. Nasir. Kutb al-Din was able to retake the province for a short time after receiving aid from the Kartid dynasty of Herat, but Mubariz al-Din permanently gained control of Kirman in late 1340. The city of Bam was besieged and conquered a few years after this.

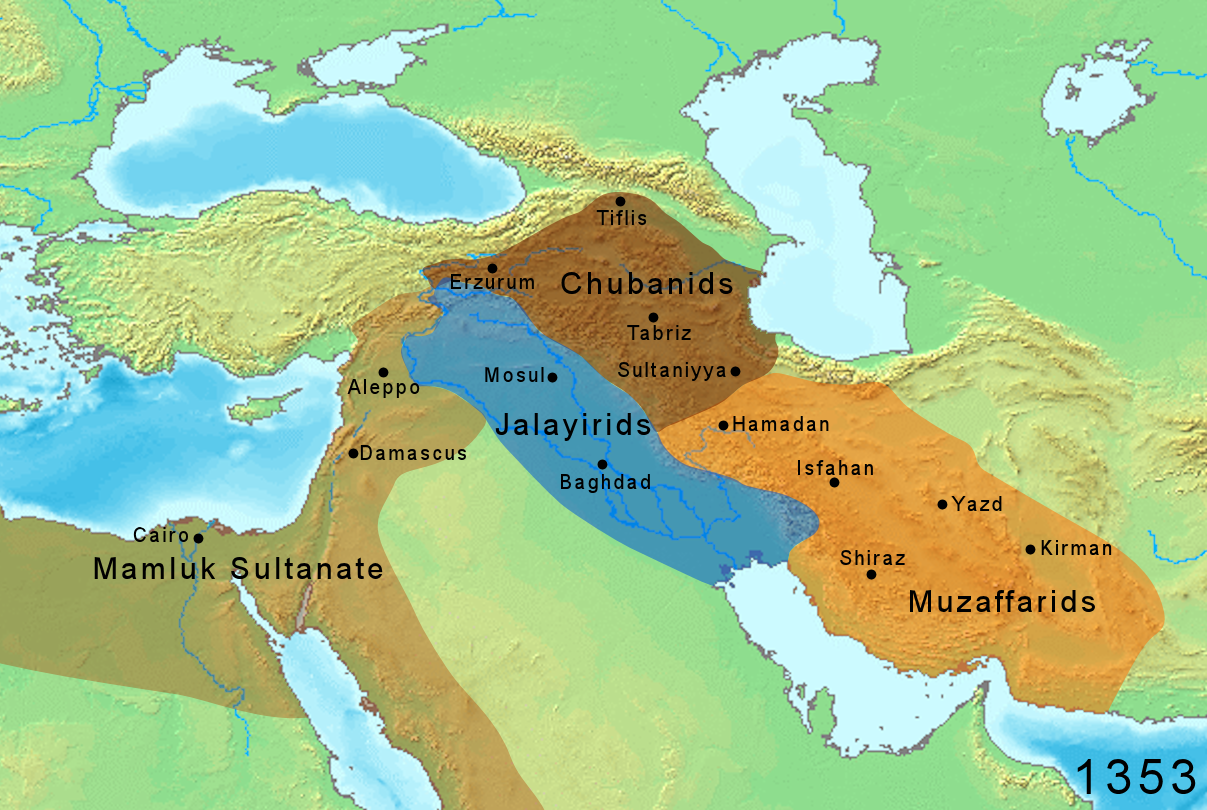
Territory of the Jalayirids , Chobanids and Muzaffarids in 1353

After the conquest of Kirman, Mubariz al-Din became a rival of the neighboring Injuids, who controlled Shiraz and Isfahan. Although the Muzaffarids and Injuids had traditionally been on friendly terms with one another, the Injuid Abu Esshaq's desire to gain Kirman led him to start a drawn-out conflict with the Muzaffarids in 1347. He unsuccessfully besieged Yazd (1350–1351), after which his fortunes declined rapidly. Defeated on the field in 1353, Abu Esshaq was forced to take refuge in Shiraz and finally surrender. He managed to escape from Shiraz and fled to Isfahan, but Mubariz al-Din pursued him, took the city and executed the Injuid ruler. Fars and western Iran were now under his control.

With the destruction of Injuid authority, the Muzaffarids were the strongest power in central Iran, and Shiraz was made their capital. Mubariz al-Din's strength was such that when the khan of the Golden Horde, Jani Beg, sent an offer to make him a vassal, he was able to decline. In fact, he pushed on into Azerbaijan, which Jani Beg had conquered in 1357. He defeated the khan's governor Akhichuq and occupied Tabriz, but realized that he could not hold his position against the Jalayirid troops marching from Baghdad and soon retreated. The Jalayirids would therefore maintain a hold on Tabriz, despite further attempts by the Muzaffarids to take it.

Mubariz al-Din was known as a cruel ruler, and soon afterwards 1358, his son Shah Shoja blinded and imprisoned him. A temporary reconciliation was reached, but it failed to last and he died, again in prison, in 1363.

== Reign of Shah Shoja ==
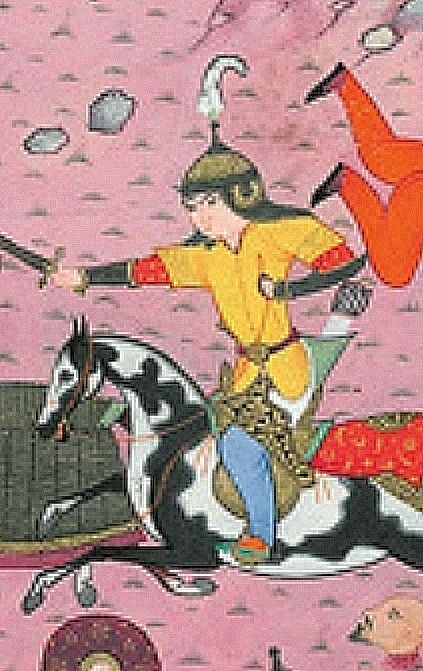
Shah Shuja (detail) in a battle against his brother Mahmud. Khvandamir, Ḥabībuʾs-Siyar, 1592

Shah Shoja proved to be a less of a tyrannic figure, but he was constantly fighting with his brothers, causing a long period of instability. In 1363 he marched against his first brother Shah Mahmud, who had been given control of Isfahan, although a peace was soon brokered. In the following year however, Shah Mahmud, with the support of his father-in-law Shaikh Uvais of the Jalayirids, invaded Fars and captured Shiraz. Shah Shoja would not be able to reconquer his capital until 1366. Shah Mahmud would continue to play and influential role in Iranian politics, using his marriage alliance to claim Tabriz from the Jalayirids after Shaikh Uvais died in 1374. He occupied the city but soon gave up after he was struck by illness. He died the next year, allowing Shah Shoja to occupy Isfahan.

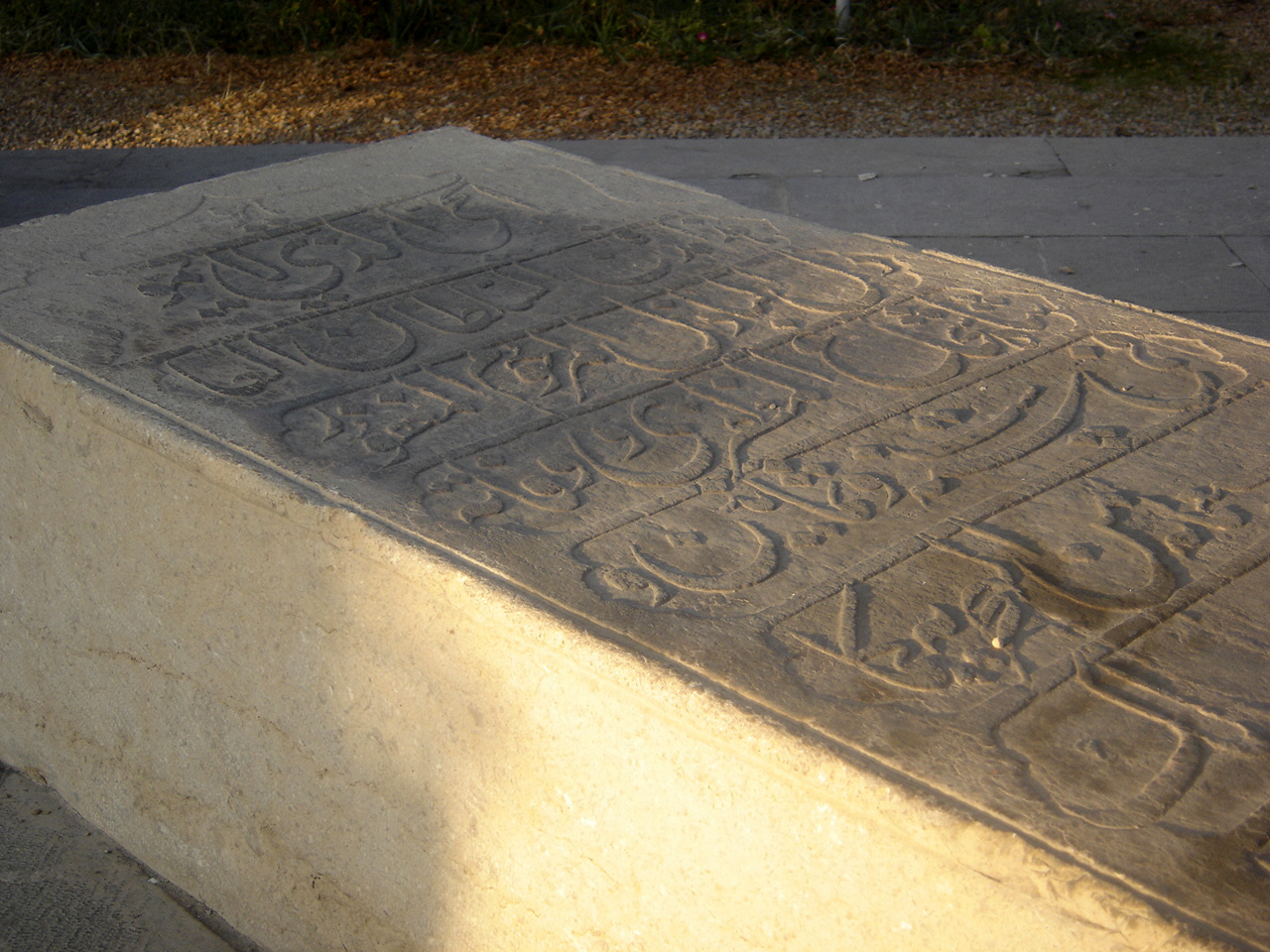
Tomb of Shah Shoja in Shiraz, Iran.

Shah Shoja then marched on Tabriz himself, but was forced to turn back when internal conditions in Fars deteriorated. His second brother Shah Muzaffar's son, Shah Yahya, rose in revolt in Isfahan. Having to make peace with the Jalayirids, Shah Shoja offered to marry his son Zain Al-Abidin to a sister of the Jalayirid ruler Husain. The Jalayirids refused the offer and invaded, although Shah Shoja managed to prevent them from getting any further than Sultaniyya. Before dying in 1384, he named his son Zain al-Abidin his successor and his third brother 'Imad ad-Din Ahmad as governor of Kirman. Not satisfied with the arrangement, Shah Yahya advanced against Shiraz, but was expelled from Isfahan by the city's populace and was forced to flee to Yazd. On his deathbed, Shah Shoja wrote a letter to Timur, who was then campaigning in Azerbaijan, in which he gave his sons' loyalty to the conqueror.

== Muzaffarid decline ==
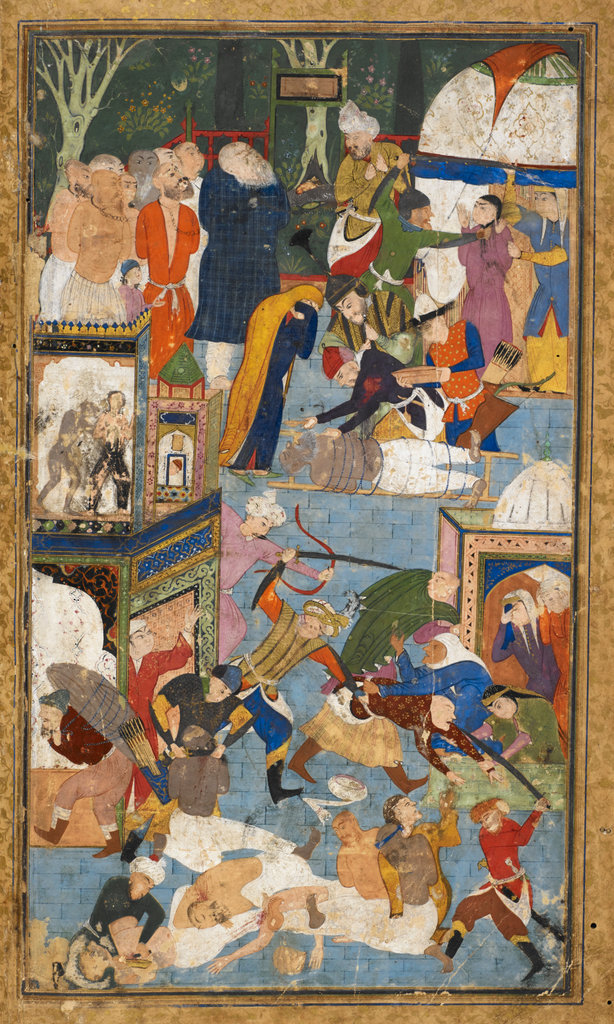
The Sacking of Isfahan (1387), by Timur. Timurnama, Bukhara (mid 16th century)

When Zain Al-Abidin succeeded his father, he quickly ignored the declaration of loyalty. Timur therefore marched into the Muzaffarid lands. He came to Isfahan, where the governor gave him control of the city, but a rebellion in the city killed any goodwill Timur had, resulting in a slaughter of the populace, in the Sacking of Isfahan (1387). Zain Al-Abidin fled from Shiraz in an attempt to make it to the Jalayirids in Baghdad, who were enemies of Timur. However, he encountered Shah Yahya's brother Shah Mansur, who imprisoned him. Shiraz soon fell to Timur. Shah Mansur and 'Imad ad-Din Ahmad, along with other Muzaffarid princes, went to Shiraz to declare their loyalty, whereupon Timur restored them to their positions. The conqueror soon after returned to Transoxiana; Shiraz was given to Shah Yahya.

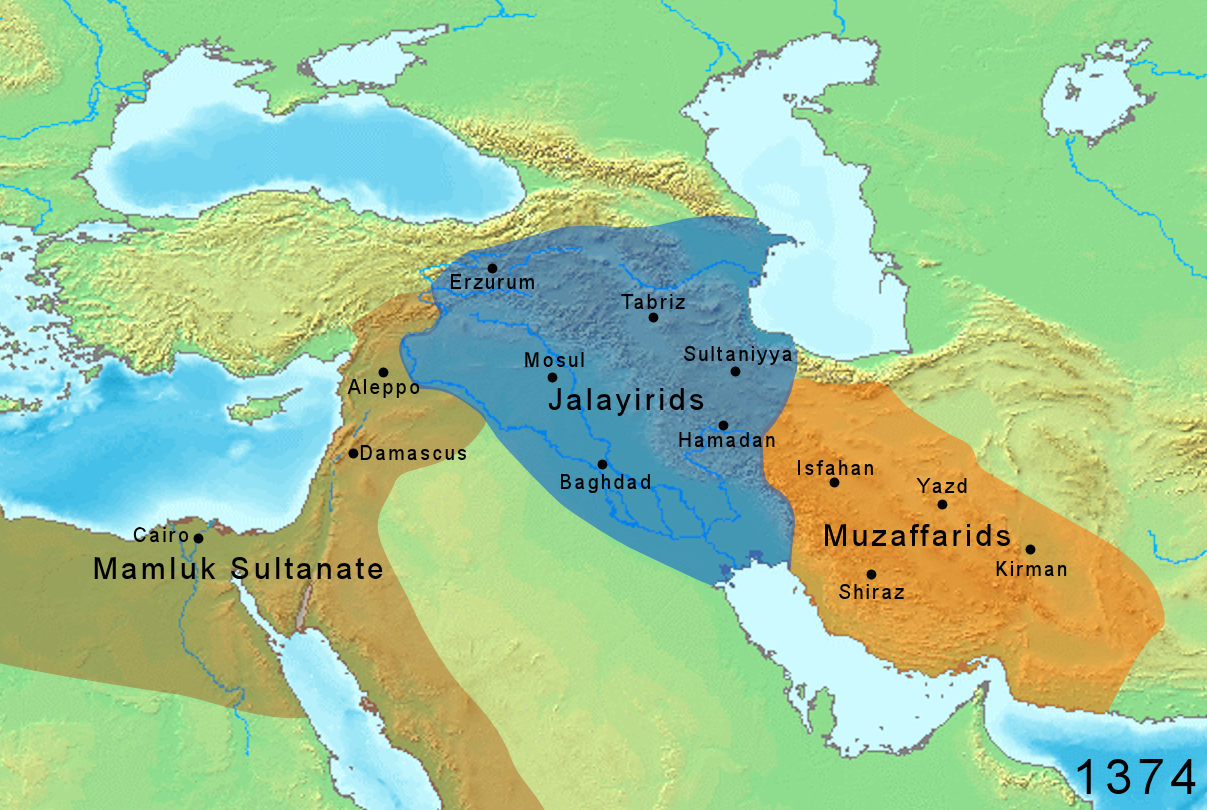
The Jalayirid state at its greatest territorial extent and the Muzaffarids in 1374, before the Timurid invasions

Unfortunately, the Mozaffarids soon began to resume their local feuding. Shah Mansur began by expelling Shah Yahya from Shiraz, whereupon Shah Yahya again fled to Yazd. Shah Mansur then conquered Abarquh, but failed to take Isfahan. Meanwhile, Zain al-Abidin escaped from prison and reached Isfahan. An alliance was then formed between Zain al-Abidin, Shah Yahya and 'Imad ad-Din Ahmad against Shah Mansur. The alliance proved to be unstable, however, and when they met Shah Mansur's army at Furg, Shah Yahya failed to show and 'Imad ad-Din Ahmad quickly retreated. The latter met Shah Mansur again, this time at Fasa, but lost and was captured in Ray. He was blinded and imprisoned. Shah Mansur then approached Kirman, where Sultan Ahmad and Shah Yahya had gone after the events at Furg. He offered a common alliance against Timur, but was rebuffed and thereafter returned to Shiraz.

Timur, who while campaigning elsewhere took note of these events, decided in 1392 that a campaign against Shah Mansur was in order. Shah Mansur gained the Sarbadar Muluk as his ally; Muluk was sent to defend Kashan and the Mozaffarid northern front. By March 1393 Timur had advanced down to Shushtar and Dizful, installing a Sarbadar as governor there. He also freed 'Imad-Din Ahmad from imprisonment. Shah Mansur fled Shiraz, but then turned around and met Timur's forces at the Battle of Shiraz (1393). With an army weakened by desertions, he fought bravely but was forced to retreat. Attempting to reach Shiraz, he was captured by the forces of prince Shah Rukh and was decapitated. The other Muzaffarid princes then again swore allegiance to Timur. They were received honorably by the conqueror, but on 22 May in Qumisha they were executed. Their bodies were buried in a graveyard. Only Zain al-Abidin and Sultan Shibli (another son of Shah Shoja) survived the purge; they were sent to Samarkand.

== Culture ==
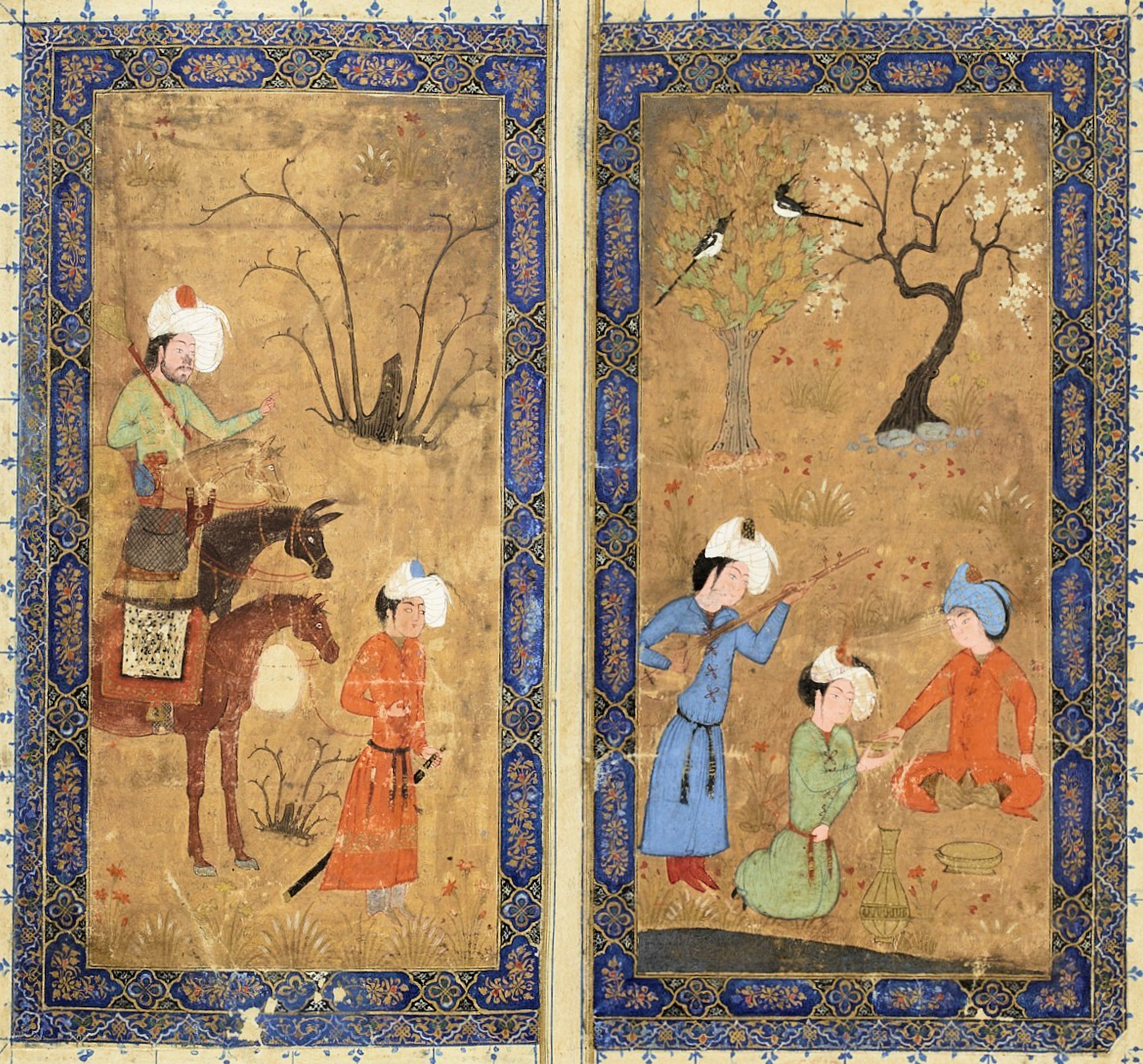
Contemporary frontispiece with Prince and attendants, probably circa 1390, final Muzaffarid period, Shiraz. Kalila and Dimna, BNF Persan 377.

During Muzaffarid rule, Shiraz emerged as one of the foremost cultural and intellectual centres of fourteenth-century Iran. The dynasty’s most prominent ruler, Shah Shuja (r. 1358–1384), gained a reputation for literary refinement and courtly patronage. His court attracted poets, scholars, and artists, who found in Shiraz a relatively stable environment compared to other parts of Iran that were more directly affected by conflict.

One of the most important cultural figures associated with the Muzaffarids was the poet Ḥāfeẓ of Shiraz, widely regarded as one of the greatest lyric poets in the Persian language. Although his relationship with Shah Shuja was not without tension, the environment fostered by the Muzaffarid court enabled him and other poets to thrive. Their works, particularly in the ghazal form, reflect both the literary sophistication and the mystical leanings of Shiraz at the time. The dynasty’s support for poetry and intellectual life contributed to the consolidation of Shiraz as a city synonymous with Persian high culture, a reputation it retained for centuries.

Beyond Ḥāfeẓ, other scholars and writers flourished under Muzaffarid patronage. The philosopher and theologian Jalāl al-Dīn Dawānī, though active slightly later, was influenced by the intellectual environment sustained in Shiraz during Muzaffarid rule. The mathematician and logician Quṭb al-Dīn al-Shīrāzī, known for his works on astronomy and optics, also lived and taught in Shiraz during the period of Muzaffarid ascendancy. In addition, the scholar Jamāl al-Dīn Aḥmad ibn ‘Abd al-Karīm al-Farāhī authored Maqālīd al-ʿulūm (“Keys to the Sciences”), an encyclopaedic treatise dedicated to Shah Shuja, which demonstrates the intellectual prestige of the court and the ruler’s active support for the sciences.

The Muzaffarids also invested in religious and civic architecture. They funded the construction and renovation of mosques, madrasas, and Sufi lodges (khānqāhs), thereby reinforcing both Sunni orthodoxy and Sufi traditions. Surviving architectural examples include the Masjid-i Jameh of Yazd and additions made to the Masjid-i Atiq in Shiraz. While not as monumental as the Timurid projects that followed, these works demonstrate a continuation of Iranian Islamic architectural styles and served as important communal and religious centres.

Religious and intellectual life under the Muzaffarids was marked by support for Sufi orders, which played a central role in Persian culture during this period. The interaction between courtly patronage and mystical traditions is evident in the works of poets like Ḥāfeẓ, who combined lyrical artistry with Sufi symbolism. The dynasty’s recognition of Sufi institutions helped to ensure their integration into the social and cultural fabric of Shiraz and other cities under their rule.

The Muzaffarids’ cultural contribution lies in their role as a bridge between the Ilkhanid and Timurid eras. Although their political authority was limited and eventually curtailed by Timur’s conquests, their patronage of poets, scholars, and architects maintained and transmitted key elements of Persian cultural life. The flourishing of Shiraz under their rule provided the foundation for the more expansive cultural renaissance of the Timurid courts in Herat and Samarkand in the fifteenth century.

== Architecture ==
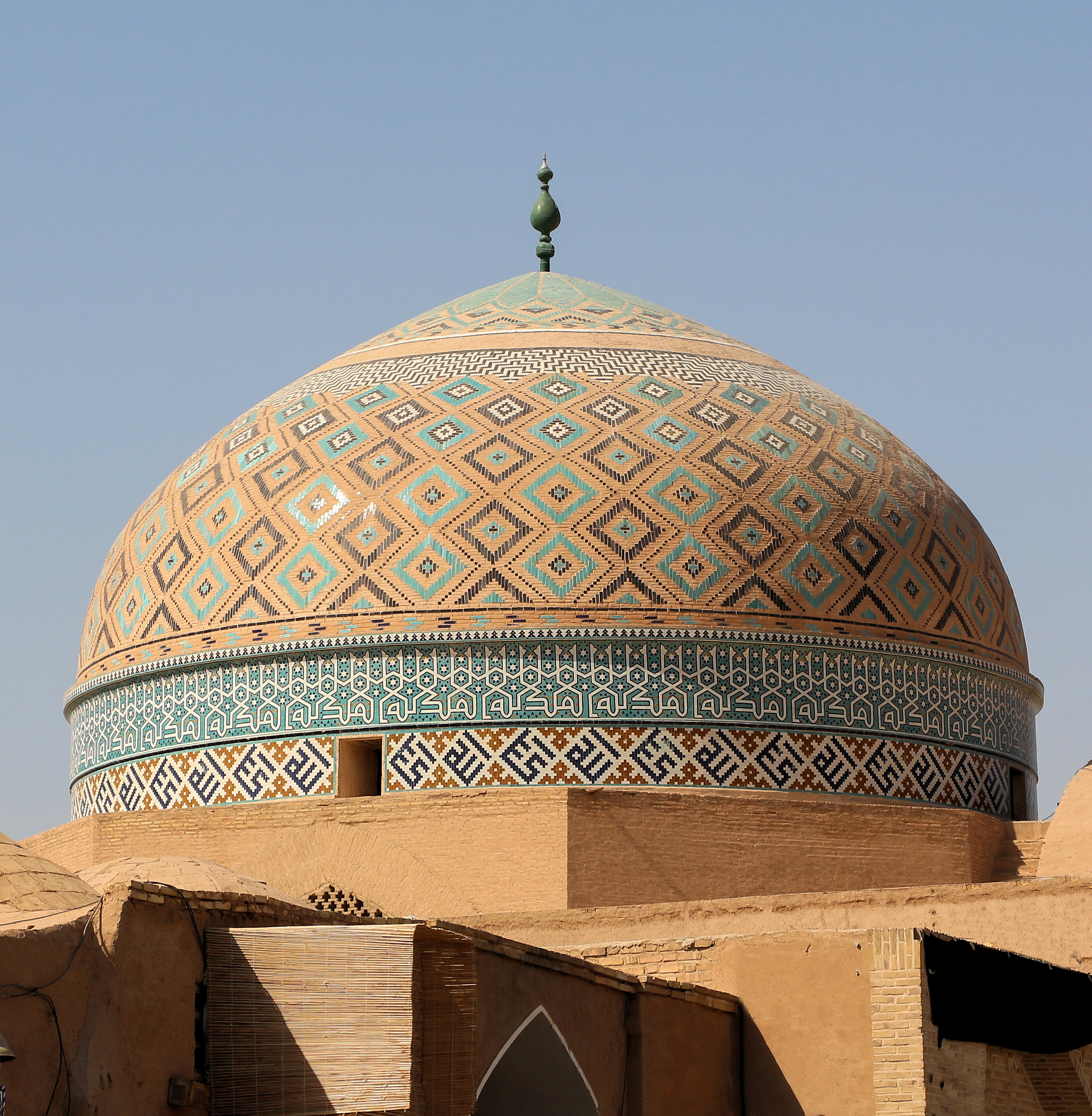
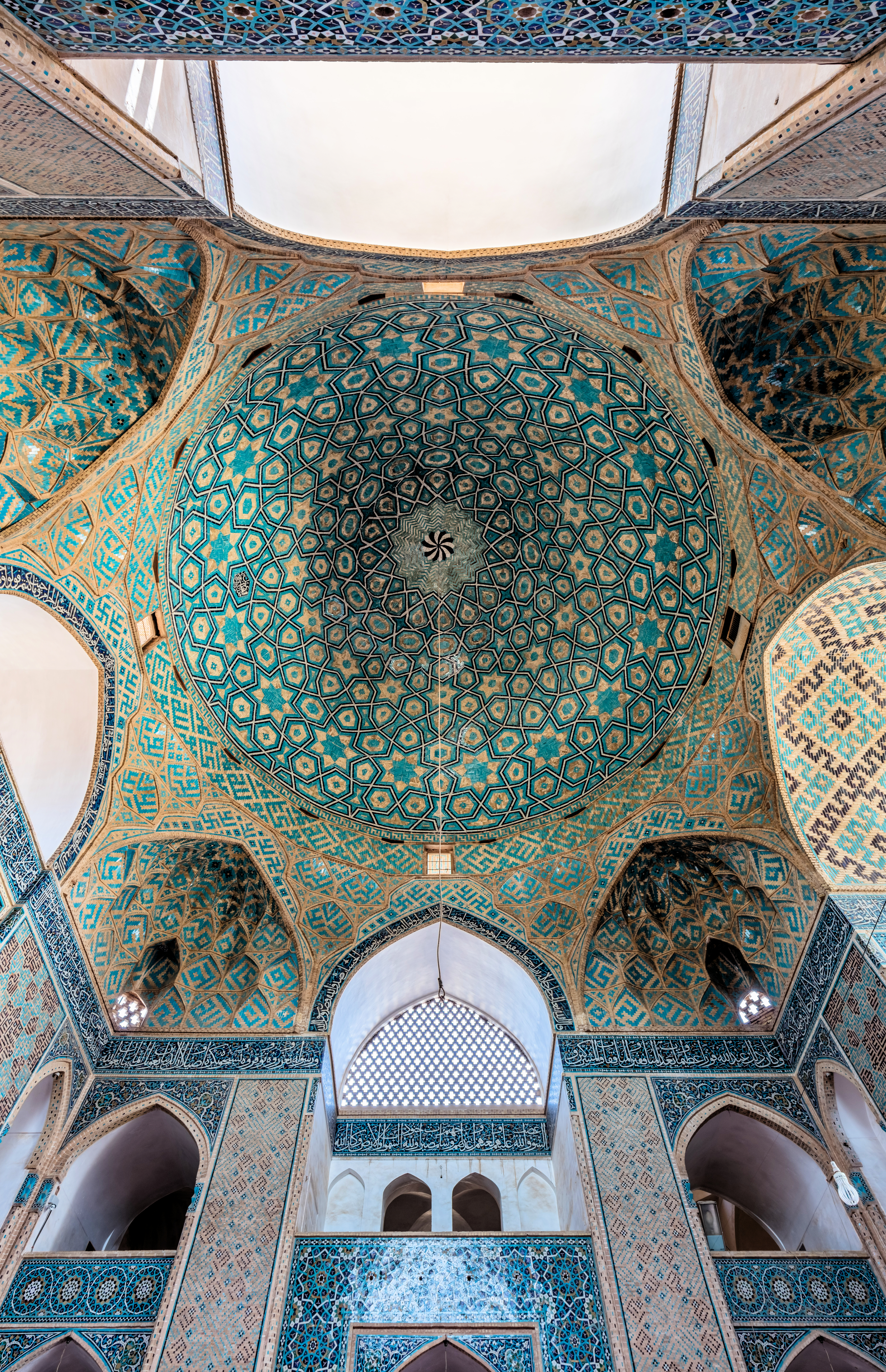
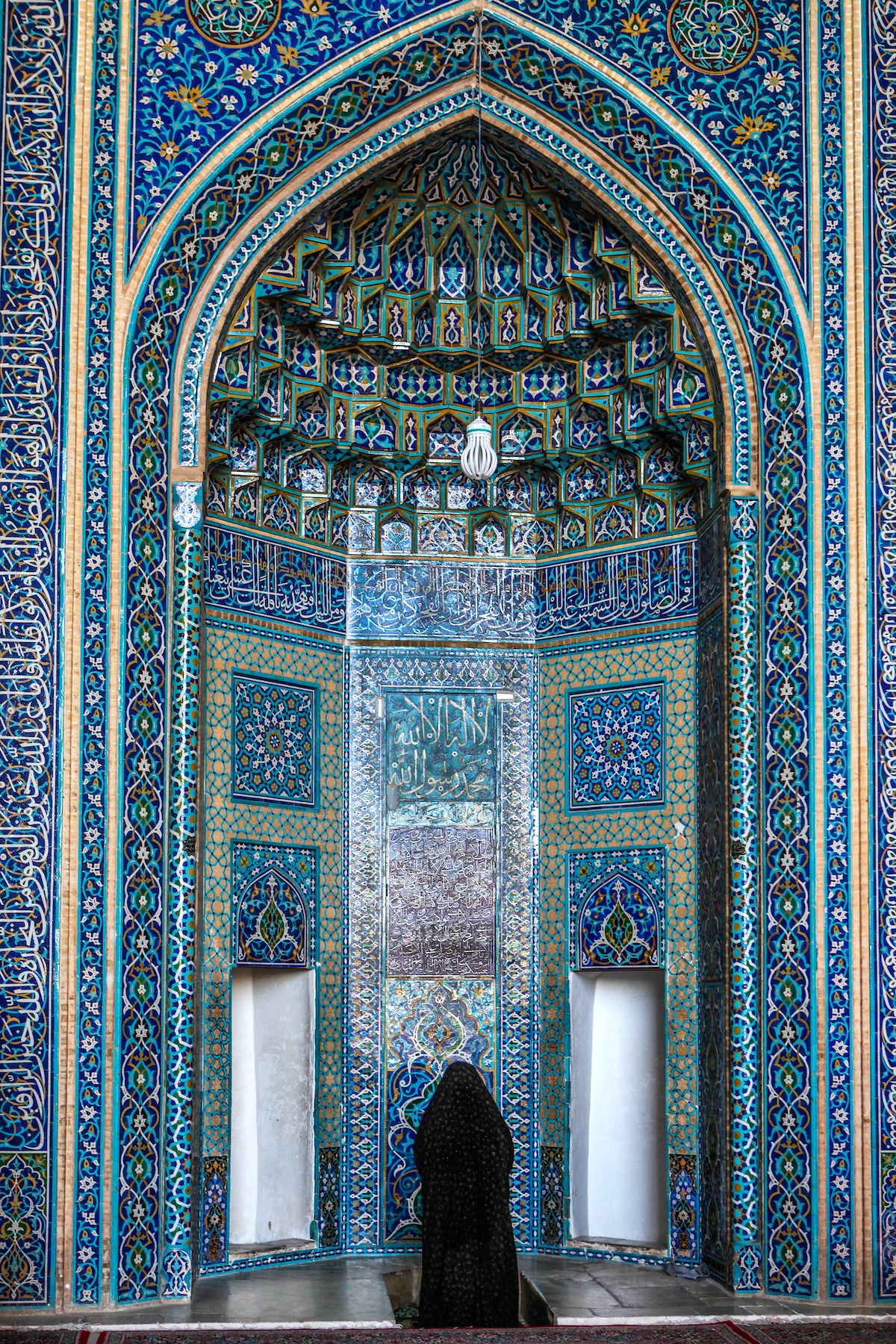
Muzaffarid structure and decoration of the dome and inside of the Jameh Mosque of Yazd, and mihrab, 1375.

The Muzaffarids were active builders. The Hasht Dome and Hasht Hussainiya in Yazd were built in 1328 in comparatively bland style. Later, they contributed remarkably to some of the elements and decoration of the Jameh Mosque of Yazd, which they enlarged from an earlier Il Khanid base in 1365. In the mosque, the Muzaffarids built the prayer hall from mud bricks ca. 1360. Individual prayer halls have large high windows on white walls, illuminated the devotional space. The interior decoration of the chamber and galleries consists in a combination of plain and glazed terracotta. The dome of the prayer chamber, finished in 1375, is decorated on the inside with geometric patterns in blue and beige, while the outside is adorned with a geometric arabesque of blue and black tile mosaics on a beige background. The mihrab in cut-tile mosaic was installed at the same time.

== Muzaffarid rulers ==
- Mubariz al-Din Muhammad (1314–1358)
- Shah Shoja (1358–1364)
- Shah Mahmud (at Isfahan) (1364–1366)
- Shah Shoja (1366-1384)
- Zain al-Abidin (1384–1387)
- Shah Yahya (in Shiraz, 1387–1391)
- Sultan Ahmad (in Kerman, 1387–1391)
- Sultan Abu Ishaq (in Sirajan 1387–1391)
- Shah Mansur (1391–1393)

== See also ==
- List of kings of Persia
- Yazd, a city dominated by the Mozaffarids
- List of Sunni Muslim dynasties
- Soltan Bakht Agha Mausoleum

== Sources ==
- Bosworth, C.E. (1996). The New Islamic Dynasties. Columbia University Press.
- Browne, Edward G. (1920). A History of Persian Literature under Tartar Dominion (AD 1265-1502). Cambridge at the University Press.
- Golombek, Lisa; Wilber, Donald Newton (1988). The Timurid Architecture of Iran and Turan (Vol. 1, 2). Princeton, NJ: Princeton Univ. Pr. ISBN 978-0691035871.
- Jackson, Peter (1993). "Muzaffarids". In Bosworth, C. E.; van Donzel, E.; Heinrichs, W. P. & Pellat, Ch. (eds.). The Encyclopaedia of Islam, Second Edition. Volume VII: Mif–Naz. Leiden: E. J. Brill. ISBN 978-90-04-09419-2.
- Grousset, Rene (2002). The Empire of the Steppes: A History of Central Asia. Translated by Walford, Naomi. Rutgers University Press.
- Manz, Beatrice Forbes (2007). Power, Politics and Religion in Timurid Iran. Cambridge University Press. ISBN 978-1-139-46284-6.
- Roemer, H.R. (1986). "The Jalayirids, Muzaffarids and Sarbadars". In Lockhart, Laurence; Jackson, Peter (eds.). The Cambridge History of Iran: The Timurid and Safavid Periods. Vol. 6. Cambridge: Cambridge University Press. pp. 1—41. ISBN 0-521-20094-6.
- Morgan, David (2010). The New Cambridge History of Islam, Volume 3. Cambridge University Press. p. 194. ISBN 978-0-521-83823-8.
- Zetterstéen, K.V. (2020). "Muẓaffarids". Encyclopaedia of Islam First Edition Online. doi:10.1163/2214-871X_ei1_SIM_4963.
- M. Ismail Marcinkowski, Persian Historiography and Geography: Bertold Spuler on Major Works Produced in Iran, the Caucasus, Central Asia, India and Early Ottoman Turkey, with a foreword by Professor Clifford Edmund Bosworth, member of the British Academy, Singapore: Pustaka Nasional, 2003. ISBN 9971-77-488-7.
- Wing, Patrick (11 November 2014). "Mozaffarids". Encyclopædia Iranica Online edition, 2014. Encyclopædia Iranica Foundation.
