= Siege of Isfahan (1387) =

Part of Timur's Persian campaigns

- Part of Timurid conquests and invasions
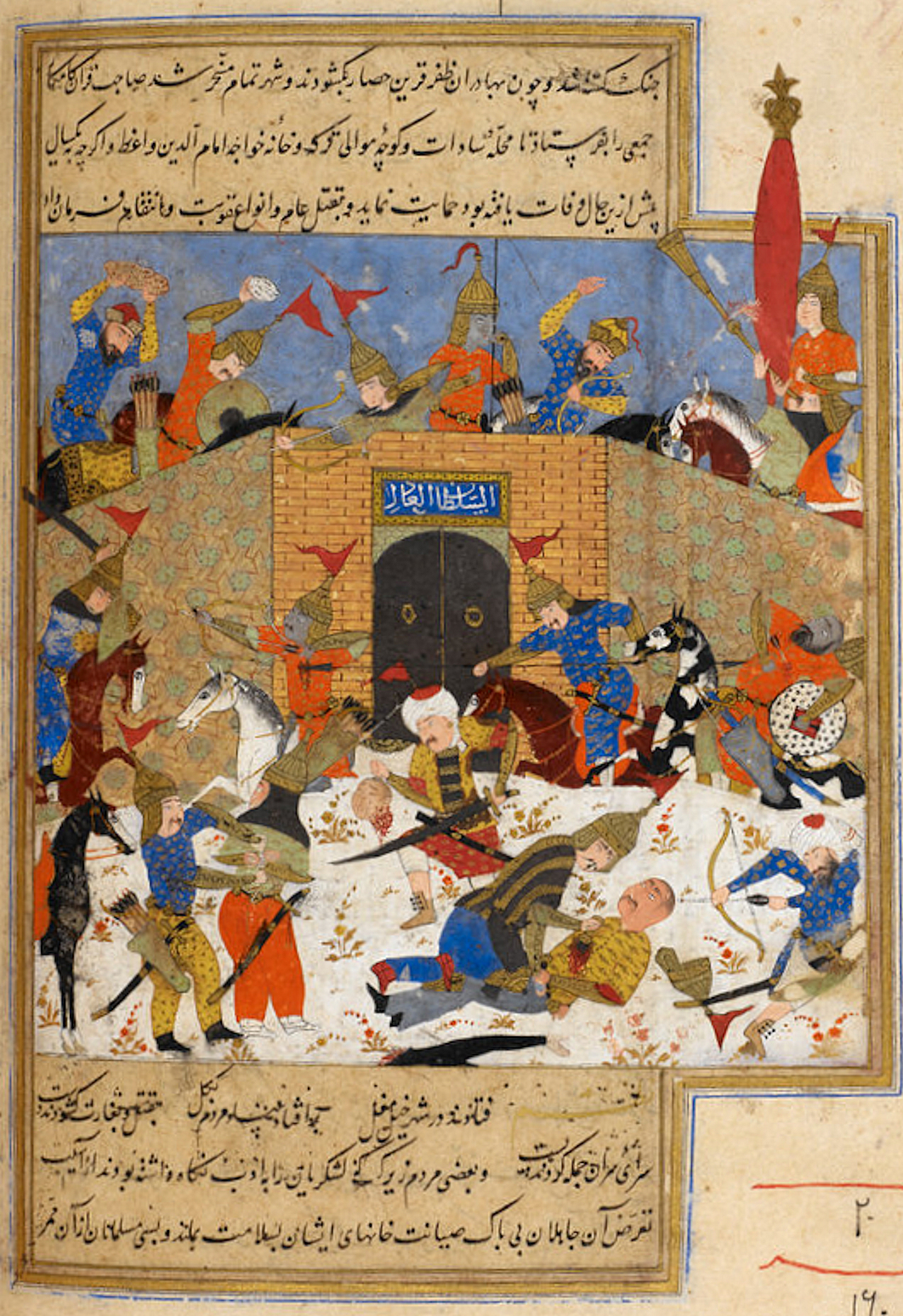
- Timur’s forces capture Isfahan in 1387. Zafarnama (1533)
Date	1387
Location	Isfahan, Iran 32.665278°N 51.670278°E
Result	Timurid victory
Territorial changes	Timurids capture Isfahan

Belligerents
Timurid Empire	Muzaffarid dynasty

Commanders and leaders
Timur	Unknown Muzaffarid governor

Strength
~20,000–30,000 troops	~15,000–25,000 troops

Casualties and losses
Unknown	~70,000 civilians selectively killed or executed
- Location within Iran Siege of Isfahan (1387) (West and Central Asia)

The Siege of Isfahan (1387) was part of Timur’s Persian campaigns. Timur captured the city from the Muzaffarid dynasty, resulting in heavy casualties and its incorporation into the Timurid Empire.

== Background ==
To annex the Muzaffarid kingdom, Timur would have to capture its two main cities: Isfahan and Shiraz. In 1387, when Timur arrived with his army at Isfahan, it immediately surrendered, and he treated it with relative mercy, as he normally did with cities that surrendered.

== Siege ==
Soon after, Isfahan revolted against Timur’s taxes by killing the tax collectors and some of his soldiers. Timur laid siege to the city and recaptured it with little effort.

== Massacre of citizens ==
After restoring his control over the city, he ordered the massacre of the citizens who had resisted; the death toll has been estimated between 70,000 – 200,000.

An eyewitness counted more than 28 towers constructed of about 1,500 heads each. This has been described as a “systematic use of terror against towns…an integral element of Tamerlane’s strategic method,” which he viewed as preventing bloodshed by discouraging resistance. His massacres were selective, sparing those who were artistic and educated. This would later influence the next great Iranian conqueror, Nader Shah.

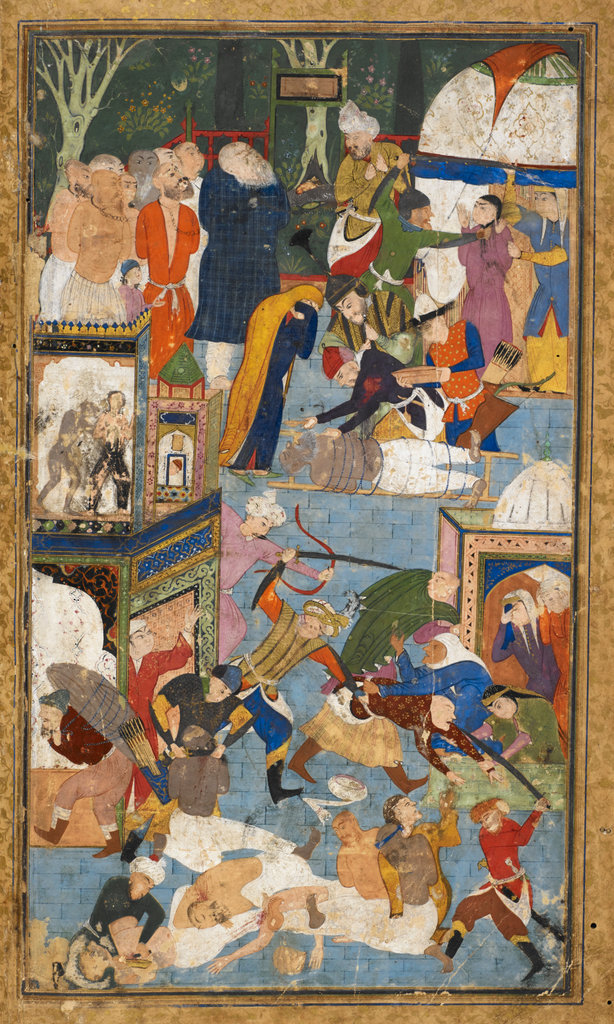
The Sacking of Isfahan (1387), by Timur. Timurnama, Bukhara (mid 16th century)

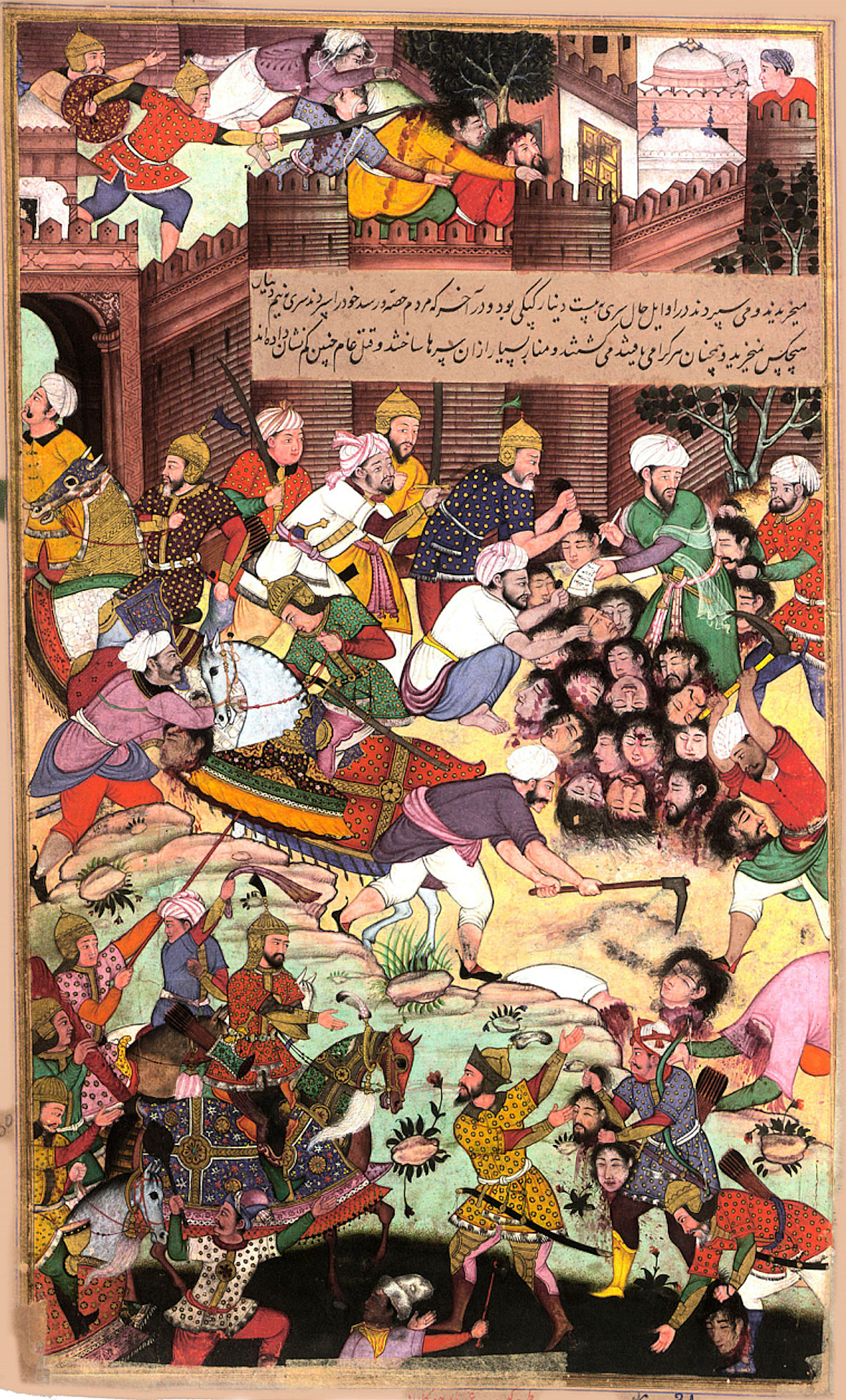
Timur’s troops bring the heads of the inhabitants of Isfahan to build a minaret of skulls in 1387. Tarikh-i Khandan-i Timuriyya

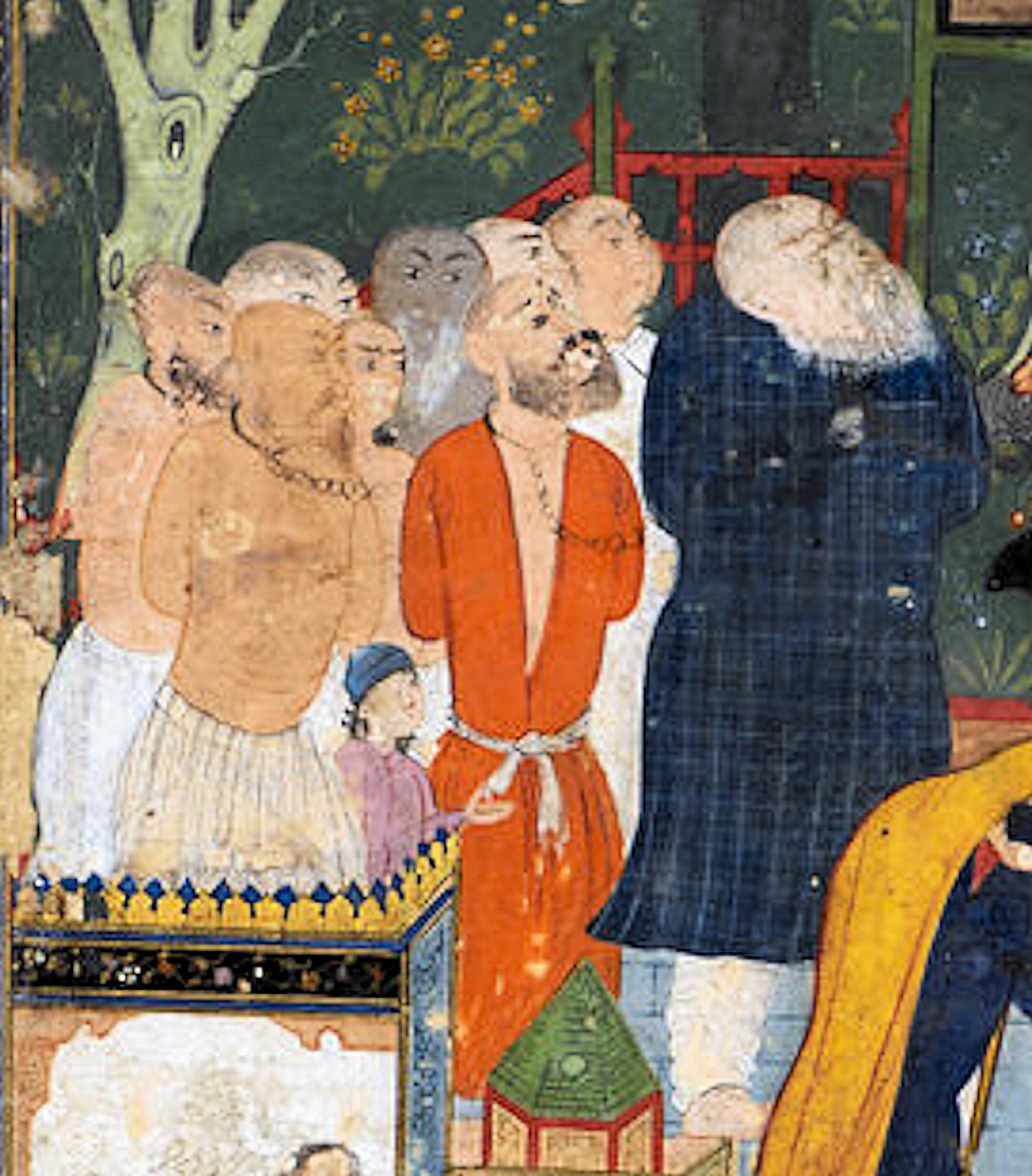
Prisoners in the Timurid capture of Isfahan in 1387

== Aftermath ==
After the massacre, Isfahan remained loyal to Timur, and he then went on to capture Shiraz. Unlike the events following the Siege of Herat, Timur did not destroy any buildings or architecture, allowing the city to retain its importance and influence in Persia.
