= Mubariz al-Din Muhammad =

Founding ruler of the Muzaffarids from 1314 to 1358

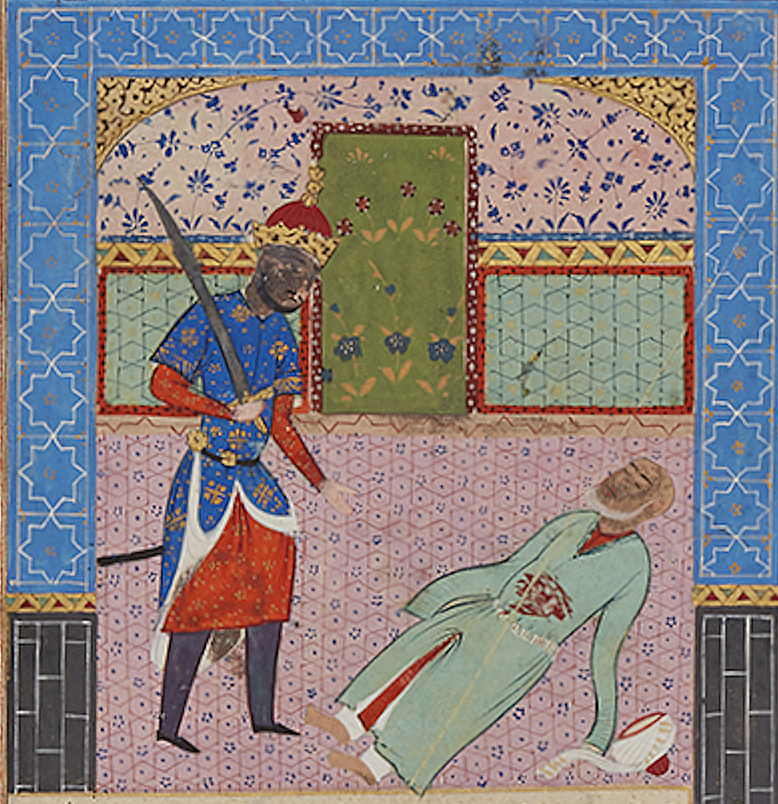
- Attack of the sons of Mubariz al-Din on their father. Folio from a manuscript of Nigaristan, Iran, probably Shiraz, dated 1573–74.

Shah of the Muzaffarid dynasty
- Reign: 1314–1358
- Predecessor: Office established
- Successor: Shah Shuja
- Born: 1301
- Died: 1363 (aged 61–62)
- Spouse: Makhdum Shah
- Issue: Shah Shuja; Shah Mahmud; Shah Ahmad
- Dynasty: Muzaffarid
- Father: Sharaf al-Din Muzaffar
- Mother: Mongol ethnicity

Mubariz al-Din Muhammad (Persian: مبارز الدین محمد; 1301–1363), was the founder of the Muzaffarid dynasty, ruling from 1314 to 1358. He was born to a family of Arab origin, which settled in Khurasan during the Islamic conquest. The Muzaffarids have been described as an Arab, (Note: Grousset called the Muzaffarids, Arabo-Persian.) (Note: "Their ancestor, Ghiyath al-Din al-Hadjdji, was allegedly a member of an Arab family from Khwaf, in Khurasan.") (Note: Bosworth states the Muzaffarids were of distant Khurasanian Arab origin) Iranian, and Persian dynasty. His mother however was probably Mongol. He was the son of Sharaf al-Din Muzaffar, a servant of the Ilkhanids and on his father's death in 1314 Mubariz inherited his father's offices. His wife was Qutlughkhan Makdumshah, the daughter of Qutb al-Din Shah Jahan, the Khitan ruler of the Qutlugh-Khanids.

Mubariz al-Din lived at the court of Ilkhanid ruler Öljaitü until the latter's death. After Öljaitü's death, Mubariz al-Din left for Maibud, and in 1319, he captured Yazd from Hajji Shah ibn Yusuf Shah, the Atabeg of Yazd, thus putting an end to the Atabeg rule over Yazd. Sometime later, the people of Sistan rebelled against the Ilkhanids, and Mubariz al-Din was ordered to subdue the province, which he did. However, the people of Sistan shortly rebelled, and Mubariz al-Din was once again to forced to fight them; he reportedly fought the rebels in 21 battles until the province was finally subdued.

In the wake of the loss of Ilkhanate authority in central Iran following the death of Abu Sa'id, Mubariz al-Din continued to carry out his expansionary policy, and declared independence from the Ilkhanids. In 1339 or 1340 he invaded the province of Kirman and seized it from its Mongol governor, Kutb al-Din ibn Nasir. Kutb al-Din was able to retake the province for a short time after receiving aid from the Kartid dynasty of Herat, but Mubariz al-Din permanently gained control of Kirman in late 1340. The city of Bam was besieged and conquered a few years after this.

After the conquest of Kirman, Mubariz al-Din became a rival of the neighboring Injuids, who controlled Shiraz and Isfahan. Although the Muzaffarids and Injuids had traditionally been on friendly terms with one another, the Injuid Abu Ishaq Inju's desire to gain Kirman led him to start a drawn-out conflict with the Muzaffarids in 1347. He unsuccessfully besieged Yazd (1350–1351), after which his fortunes declined rapidly. During the same year, he sent an army to Kirman, which was defeated by Mubariz al-Din.

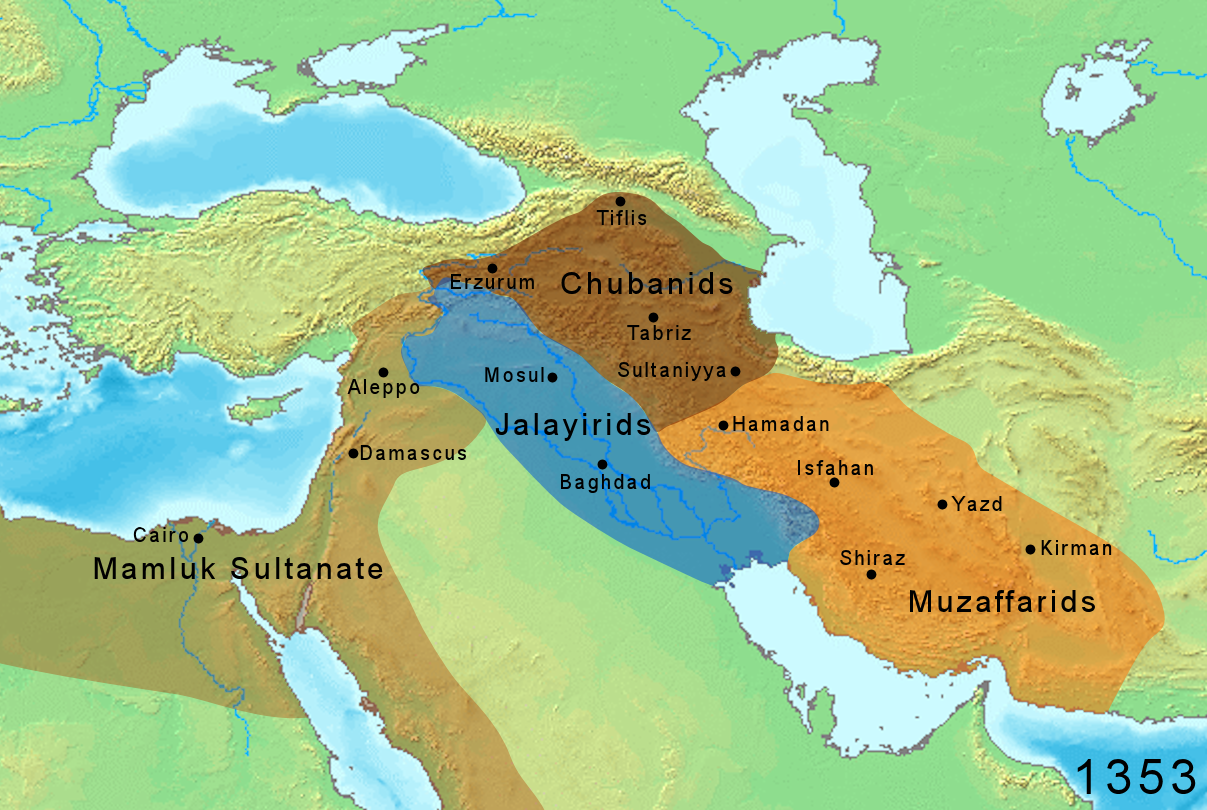
Territories of the Jalayirids, Chubanids and Muzaffarids in 1353.

In 1353, Mubariz al-Din captured Shiraz from Abu Ishaq. Abu Ishaq, however, managed to escape from Shiraz and fled to Isfahan, but Mubariz al-Din pursued him, took the city and executed the Injuid ruler. Fars and western Iran were now under his control.

With the destruction of Injuid authority, the Muzaffarids were the strongest power in central Iran, and Shiraz was made their capital. Mubariz al-Din's strength was such that when the Khan of the Golden Horde, Jani Beg, sent an offer to become his vassal, he was able to decline. In fact, he pushed on into Azerbaijan, which Jani Beg had conquered in 1357. He defeated the khan's governor Akhichuq and occupied Tabriz, but realized that he could not hold his position against the Jalayirid troops marching from Baghdad and soon retreated. The Jalayirids would therefore maintain a hold on Tabriz, despite further attempts by the Mozaffarids to take it.

Mubariz al-Din was known as a cruel ruler, and soon afterwards in 1358, his son Shah Shuja blinded and imprisoned him. A temporary reconciliation was reached, but it failed to last and he died, again in prison, in 1364.

== Sources ==
- Bosworth, C.E. (1996). The New Islamic Dynasties. Columbia University Press.
- Grousset, Rene (2002). The Empire of the Steppes: A History of Central Asia. Translated by Walford, Naomi. Rutgers University Press.
- Manz, Beatrice Forbes (2007). Power, Politics and Religion in Timurid Iran. Cambridge University Press. ISBN 978-1-139-46284-6.
- Morgan, David (2010). The New Cambridge History of Islam, Volume 3. Cambridge University Press. p. 194. ISBN 978-0-521-83823-8.
- Roemer, H.R. (1986). "The Jalayirids, Muzaffarids and Sarbadars". In Lockhart, Laurence; Jackson, Peter (eds.). The Cambridge History of Iran: The Timurid and Safavid Periods. Vol. 6. Cambridge: Cambridge University Press. pp. 1—41. ISBN 0-521-20094-6.

Preceded by Sharaf al-Din Muzaffar	Muzaffarid ruler 1314–1358	Succeeded by Shah Shuja
