= Makhdum Shah (wife of Amir Mubarez) =

Makhdum Shah Khan Qatlu was the daughter of Sultan Qutb al-Din Shah Jahan and granddaughter of Sultan Jalal al-Din Suyurghatmish, the Qarakhitai ruler of Kerman. She was the wife of Amir Mubariz al-Din Muhammad and the mother of Shah Shuja. Her authority was recognized in the region of Fars.

== Biography ==
Makhdum Shah belonged to the local tribes of the Fars region and exerted wide influence in Kerman. She was the granddaughter of Sultan Jalal al-Din Suyurghatmish and the cousin of the Khatoon, ruler of Kerman. She was born to Qutb al-Din Shah Jahan and later moved to Shiraz after being removed from power. After her father's death, she married Amir Muhammad in 1328, the son of Sharaf al-Din Muzaffar, and gave birth to Shah Shuja, Shah Mahmoud, Sultan Ahmad, Ali, and Makhdumzadeh. Amir Mubarez al-Din, knowing that the support of the Qarakhitai family could ensure Kerman's military security, appointed his wife to act on his behalf to oversee and manage affairs.

After her husband died in 1364, Makhdum Shah lived in Kerman, but her messengers constantly travelled between Kerman and Shiraz to maintain her connection with her son, Shah Shuja.

At that time, Pahlavan Asad (a descendant of Mu'ayyad al-Din Ay Abeh, and a former ruler in Fars) was acting as Shah Shuja's deputy in Kerman. As tensions grew and a conflict broke out between the forces from Kerman and Khorasan, Makhdum Shah was forced to move from Kerman to Sirjan to keep her son, Shah Shuja, informed about the situation.

She mobilized the prominent leaders of Kerman, such as Khajeh Shams al-Din, Khajeh Qutb al-Din, and the Kotwal of one of the important forts in the region, against Pahlavan Asad. Due to plans carried out by Pahlavan Asad's wife, who hoped to gain Shah Shuja's support, Pahlavan Asad was arrested and killed in 1374 or 1375 as punishment for his betrayals. Pahlavan Asad's widow was soon killed by his remaining supporters as an act of revenge for her hand in his death.

Ahmad Ali Vaziri, the author of the History of Kerman, attributes Amir Mubarez al-Din's control over Kerman to the presence of his wife, Makhdum Shah.
