= Shah Shoja Mozaffari =

Shah of the Muzaffarid dynasty from 1358 to 1384

Shah Shoja شاه‌شجاع
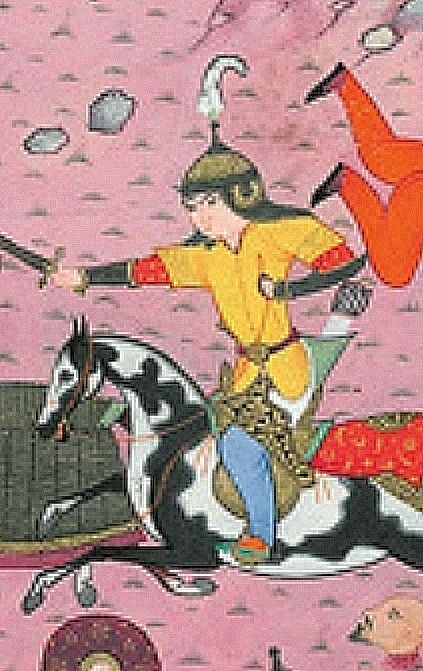
- Shah Shuja (detail) in a battle against his brother Mahmud. Khvandamir, Ḥabībuʾs-Siyar, 1592

Shah of the Muzaffarid dynasty
- Reign: 1358–1384
- Predecessor: Mubariz al-Din Muhammad
- Successor: Zain al-Abidin
- Born: 10 March 1333; Shiraz
- Died: 9 October 1384 (aged 51); Shiraz
- Spouse: A Mongol princess
- Issue: Zain al-Abidin; Uways; Shah Shibli; Pādšāh Solṭān
- Father: Mubariz al-Din Muhammad
- Mother: Makhdum Shah
- Religion: Sunni Islam

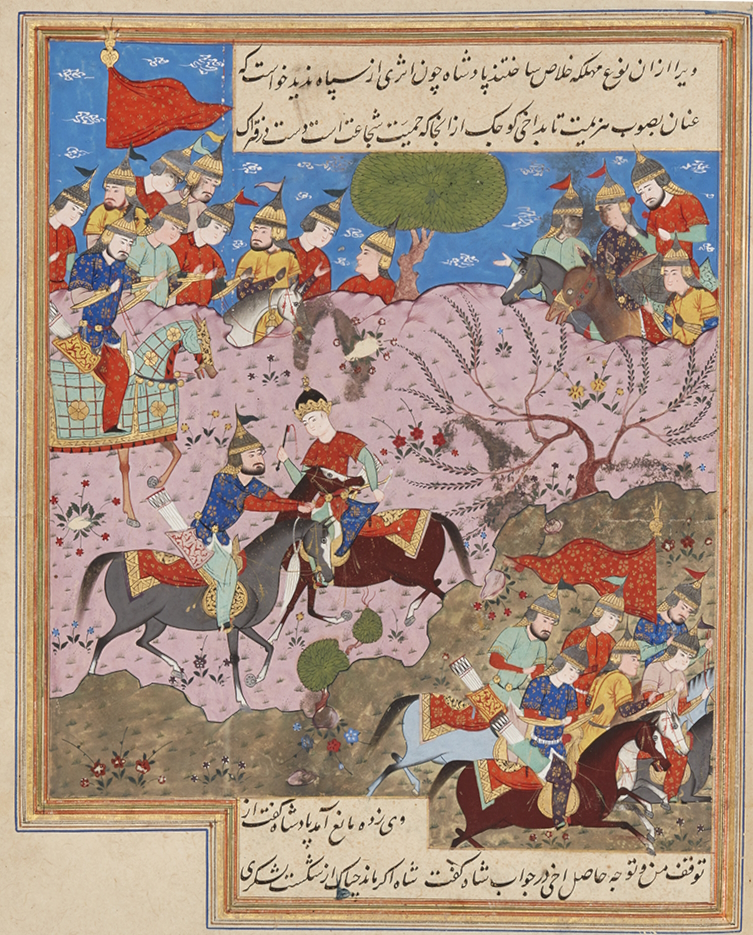
Shah Shoja Mozaffari being attacked while riding through the countryside. Folio from a manuscript of Nigaristan, Iran, probably Shiraz, dated 1573–74.

Shah Shoja (Persian: شاه شجاع, romanized: Shāh Shojā, lit. 'the brave shah'; 1333 – 1384), was the ruler of the Mozaffarids from 1358 to 1384. He was the son and successor of Mubariz al-Din Muhammad. During the lengthy reign of Shah Shoja, his kingdom reached its zenith of power, stretching from Balochistan to Arran.

== Early life ==
Shah Shoja was born on 10 March 1333—he was the son of the Muzaffarid ruler Mubariz al-Din Muhammad and the Khitan princess Khatun Qotlogh Beg, better known as Makhdum Shah, daughter of the Qutlugh-Khanids ruler Qutb al-Din Shah Jahan. His paternal grandmother was almost certainly Mongol.

His father Mubariz al-Din Muhammad, after conquering Kerman in 1341, organized a marriage between Shah Shoja and the daughter of one of the tribal Mongol chieftains who roamed the region and were important allies. His wife belonged to one of the non-Muslim Mongol tribes of Kerman, the Avḡāni and Jormāʾi, who had been granted autonomy by Abaqa Khan. This union produced three Moẓaffarid princes, as well as the princess Pādšāh Solṭān.

Shah Shoja later prevented his father from having the tomb of the prominent Persian poet Saadi Shirazi demolished, whom Mubariz al-Din Muhammad had condemned for his poems on religious factors. In 1358, Shah Shoja blinded and imprisoned his cruel father, and thus succeeded him as the ruler of the Muzaffarid dynasty.

== Reign ==
Shah Shoja proved to be a less of a tyrannic figure than his father, but he was constantly fighting with his brothers, causing a long period of instability. In ca 1362, he had his vizier Qavam al-Din Hasan executed, and replaced with Kamal al-Din Husayn Rashidi. In 1363, he marched against his first brother Shah Mahmud, who had been given control of Isfahan, although a peace was soon brokered.

In the following year however in 1364, Shah Mahmud, with the support of his father-in-law Shaikh Awais Jalayir of the Jalayirids, invaded Fars and captured Shiraz. Shah Shoja would not be able to reconquer his capital until 1366. Shah Mahmud would continue to play and influential role in Iranian politics, using his marriage alliance to claim Tabriz from the Jalayirids after Shaikh Awais Jalayir died in 1374. He occupied the city but soon gave up after he was struck by illness. He died the next year, allowing Shah Shoja to occupy Isfahan.

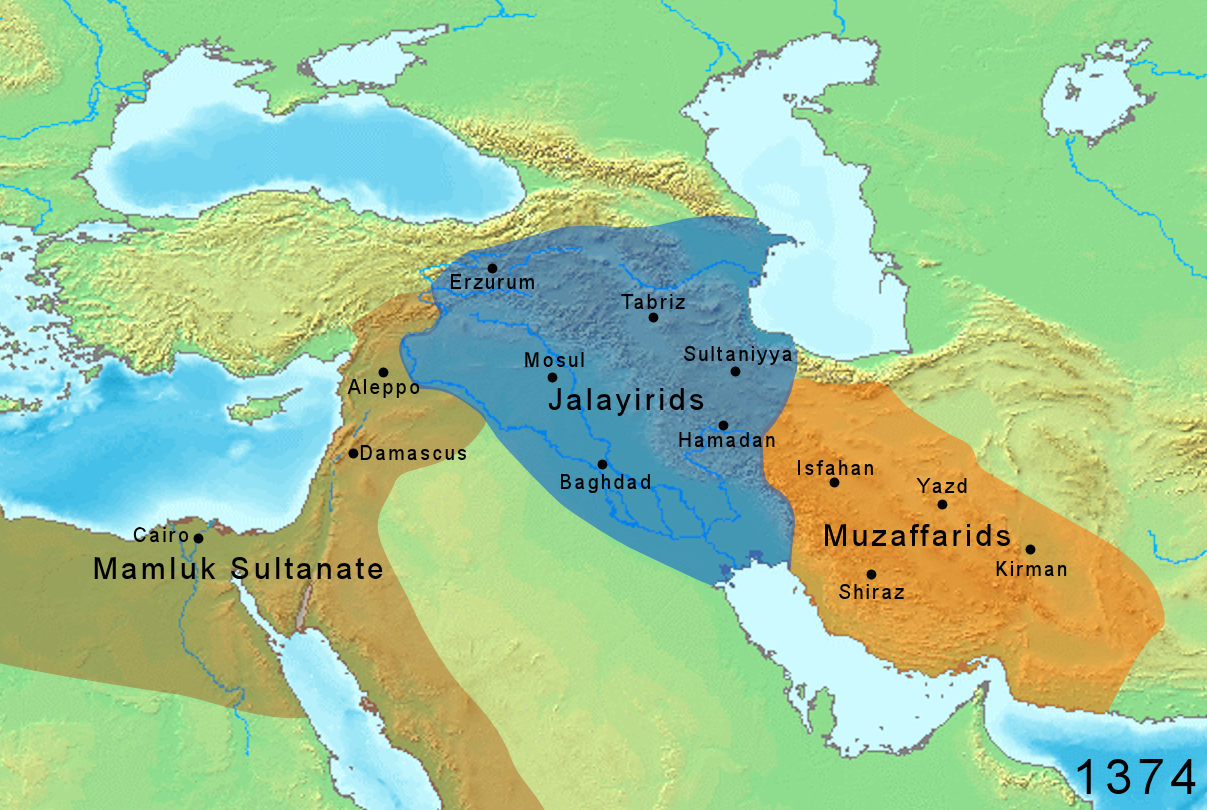
The Jalayirid state at its greatest territorial extent and the Muzaffarids in 1374, before the Timurid invasions

Shah Shoja then occupied Azerbaijan and Arran for four months, until he was forced to turn back when internal conditions in Fars deteriorated. His second brother Shah Muzaffar's son, Shah Yahya, rose in revolt in Isfahan. Having to make peace with the Jalayirids, Shah Shoja offered to marry his son Zain al-Abidin to a sister of the Jalayirid ruler Shaikh Hussain Jalayir. The Jalayirids refused the offer and invaded, although Shah Shoja managed to prevent them from getting any further than Soltaniyeh. In 1383, Shah Shoja, whilst intoxicated by alcohol and full of skepticism, had his son Sultan Shebli blinded, which he regretted the following day. A series of other tragedies followed shortly after the blinding of his son—Shah Shoja's mother Makhdum Shah and his nephew Shah Hossein died, whilst he himself received a deadly illness as a result of excessive drinking.

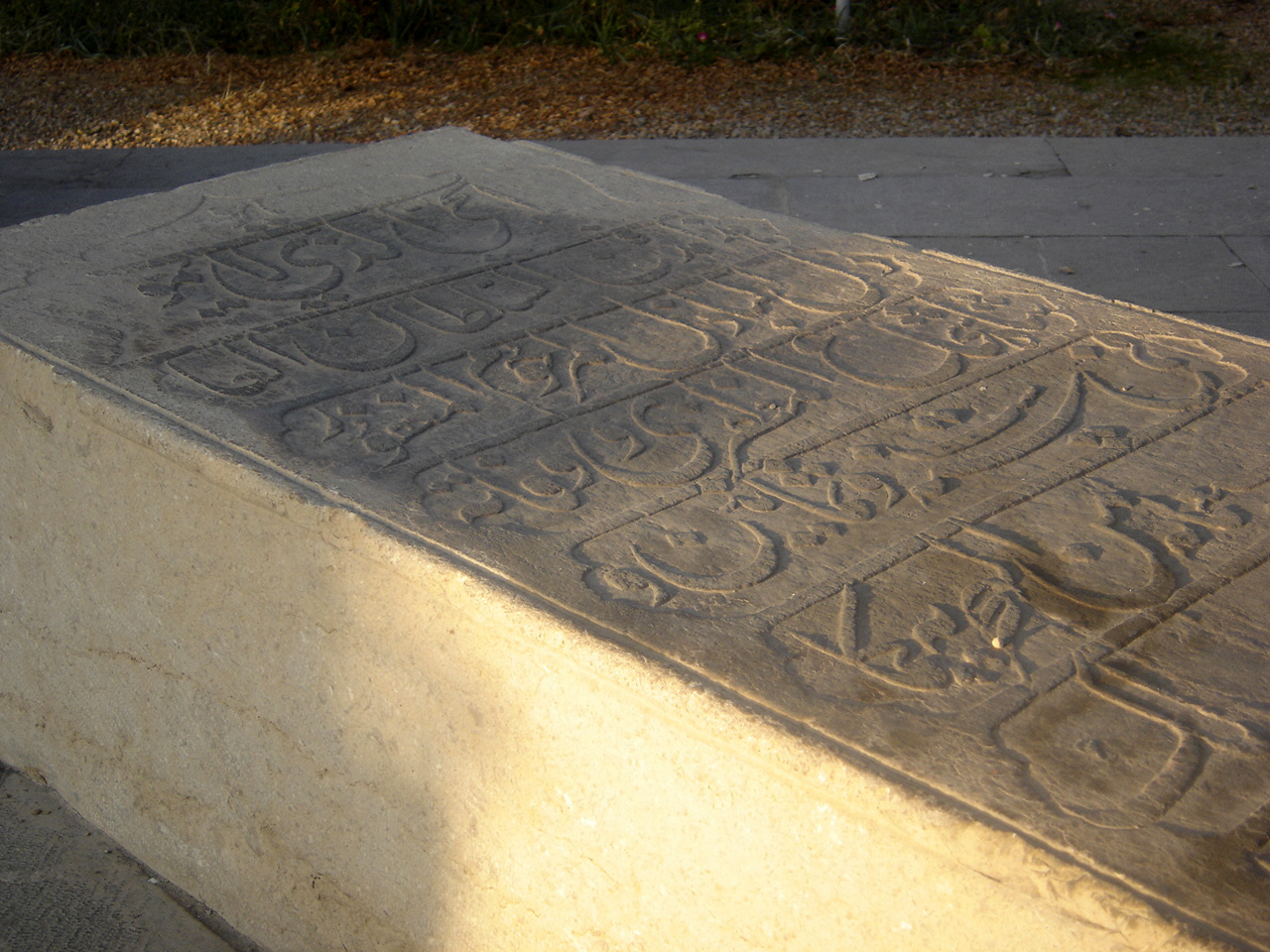
Tomb of Shah Shoja in Shiraz

Before dying in 1384, he named his son Zain al-Abidin his successor and his third brother Imad al-Din Ahmad as governor of Kerman. Not satisfied with the arrangement, Shah Yahya advanced against Shiraz, but was expelled from Isfahan by the city's populace and was forced to flee to Yazd.

In 1383, a year before his death, Shah Shoja wrote a letter to the powerful Turco-Mongol warlord Timur, who was then campaigning in Azerbaijan, in which he entrusted his sons to his care. Timur in response requested a marriage alliance. A granddaughter of Shah Shuja was provided as a wife for Timur's grandson Pir Muhammad, and the marriage ceremony took place in Balkh in 1384. After his death, Zain al-Abidin, Shah Shuja's son, did not continue however with this appeasement policy.

== Legacy ==
By the pomp of the world-kindling fortune of Shah Shoja,
By the world illuminating splendour of Shah Shoja's reign,
By glory of the world illuminating fortune of Shah Shoja's reign.

— Hafez

The representation of Shah Shoja as portrayed by contemporary and subsequent historians is that of a sophisticated yet at times harsh renaissance prince, well-educated in scholarly and theological sciences, a poet and man of learning himself, and likewise a benevolent advocate of knowledge and literary work. He was known to be very involved in scholarly discussions, with his own views on technical and rhetorical cases.

The famous Persian poet Hafez spent much of his career as a poet during the reign of Shah Shoja, and alluded to him 39 times. The 18th-century Zand ruler of Iran, Karim Khan Zand (r. 1751–1779) had the burial place of Shah Shoja renovated.

== Sources ==
- Jackson, Peter. "Muzaffarids." Encyclopaedia of Islam, Volume VII (Mif-Naz). New ed. 1993. ISBN 90-04-09419-9
- M. Ismail Marcinkowski, Persian Historiography and Geography: Bertold Spuler on Major Works Produced in Iran, the Caucasus, Central Asia, India and Early Ottoman Turkey, with a foreword by Professor Clifford Edmund Bosworth, member of the British Academy, Singapore: Pustaka Nasional, 2003, ISBN 9971-77-488-7.
- Roemer, H. R. "The Jalayirids, Muzaffarids and Sarbadars." The Cambridge History of Iran Volume 6: The Timurid and Safavid Periods. Edited by Peter Jackson. New York: Cambridge University Press, 1986. ISBN 0-521-20094-6
- Komaroff, Linda (2012). Beyond the Legacy of Genghis Khan. Brill. pp. 1–678. ISBN 9789047418573.
- Khorramshahi, Bahaʾ-al-Din (2012). "Hafez ii. Hafez's life and limes". Encyclopaedia Iranica, Vol. XI, Fasc. 5. pp. 465–469.
- Perry, John R. (2011). "Karim Khan Zand". Encyclopaedia Iranica, Vol. XV, Fasc. 6. pp. 561–564.
- Limbert, John W. (2011). Shiraz in the Age of Hafez: The Glory of a Medieval Persian City. University of Washington Press. pp. 1–192. ISBN 9780295802886.
- Loloi, Parvin (2004). Hafiz, Master of Persian Poetry: A Critical Bibliography. I.B.Tauris. pp. 1–392. ISBN 9781860649233.
- Wing, Patrick (2014). "Mozaffarids". Encyclopaedia Iranica.

Preceded by Mubariz al-Din Muhammad	Muzaffarid ruler 1358–1364	Succeeded by Shah Mahmud
Preceded by Shah Mahmud	Muzaffarid ruler 1367–1384	Succeeded by Zain al-Abidin
