= Qaramalik =

A simple Ashura ceremony in Qaramalek (Tabriz)

Qaramalik (Azerbaijani: قره ملیک, Persian: قره مَلیک) is a historical neighbourhood in the western part of the Iranian city Tabriz. Qaramalik is surrounded by Aji Chay river from north, Ravasan and Tabriz railway station in south and Hokmavar and Sham Qazan in east. Qaramalik used to be a village near Tabriz, however after the demolition of the walls of the city in the late nineteenth century and then expansion of the city, it became part of Tabriz and is now a part of district 6 of Tabriz municipality.

During 1960s and 1970s Qaramalik changed rapidly from a village with agriculture economy into an industrial region, when Tabriz Mashin Sazi factory was established in the farm lands of the village. Later several other factories were founded in Qaramalik, such as Idem, Pumpiran. A poly-technique college was found later as well. Behruz Heschmat's Work and Thought sculpture, located in Qaramalik, is one of the symbols of modern Qaramalik. Unsustainable industrialization affected the village not only by adding a modern face to the still rural neighbourhood, but also by destroying most of the gardens and villages as well. Only a few farms have survived the land use change and the neighoubourhood suffers from the environmental effects of the factories.

Qaramalik has an old main square, called Hoseiniyeh square. Qaramalik has ten mosques, among which the Friday mosque is the most important one, which is located in Hoseiniyeh square. Also one cemetery-out of several historic cemeteries-of Qaramalik has survived.

Qaramalik's role during Iranian Constitutional Revolution is a controversial topic. Some believe that Qaramalik was supporting grand ayatollah Hasan Mojtahed Tabrizi. Also it has been mentioned that Qaramalik was Mohammad Ali Shah forces' attack point against revolutionaries in Tabriz.
