= Fakhr aI-Din Isa ibn Ibrahim =

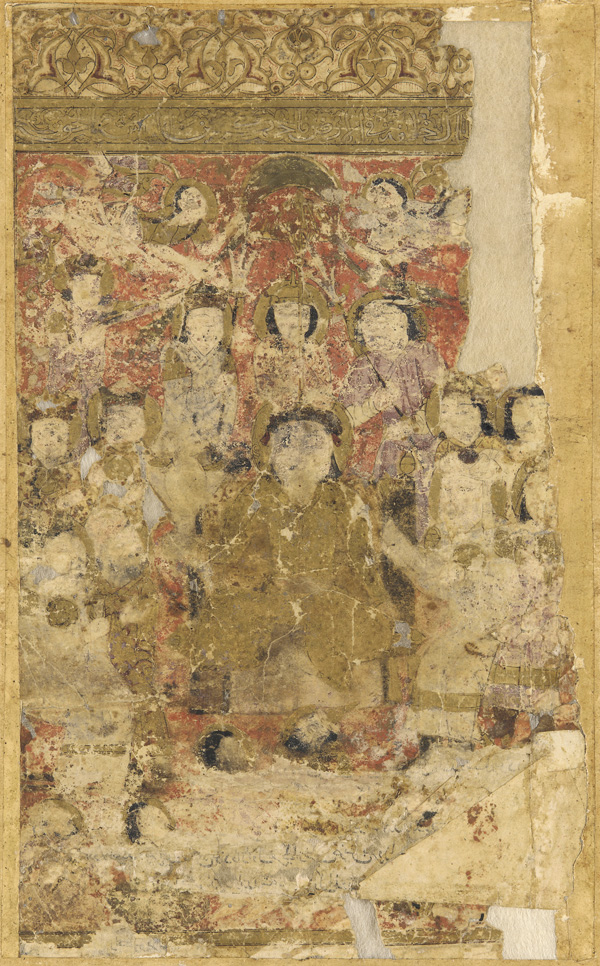
Likely depiction of Fakhr aI-Din Isa ibn Ibrahim enthroned. Bal'ami's Persian version of Tabari's Universal History. 1300-1350, Il-Khanid dynasty. F1957.16

Fakhr al-Din Isa ibn Ibrahim al-Nasrani ("the Christian") (died 1303) was an Arab Christian who was a governor of the city of Mosul for the Mongol Ilkhanid ruler Ghazan Khan (r. 1295-1304). He was a bibliophile and was famous for his cultural activity, welcomed men of letters and poets at his residence.

He may have converted to Islam.

He was likely depicted in a frontispiece of Bal'ami's Persian version of Tabari's Universal History (F1957.16), enthroned and holding a hawk in his hand, a symbol of Mongol authority.

He was executed by Ghazan in 1303, following complaints of oppression and injustice by the inhabitants of Mosul.
