= Qaraghaj, Tabriz =

Qaraghaj is a historic and ancient district in the eastern part of Tabriz. Qaraghaj means "Elm tree" in the Azerbaijani language. Qaraghaj district is bordered by Viji Bashi and Hokmavar districts in north, Kuchabagh district in south, Gajil district in east and Akhini district in west.

== Sources ==
- Qaraghaj
