= Akhini =

Coordinates: 38°4′57″N 46°15′18″E

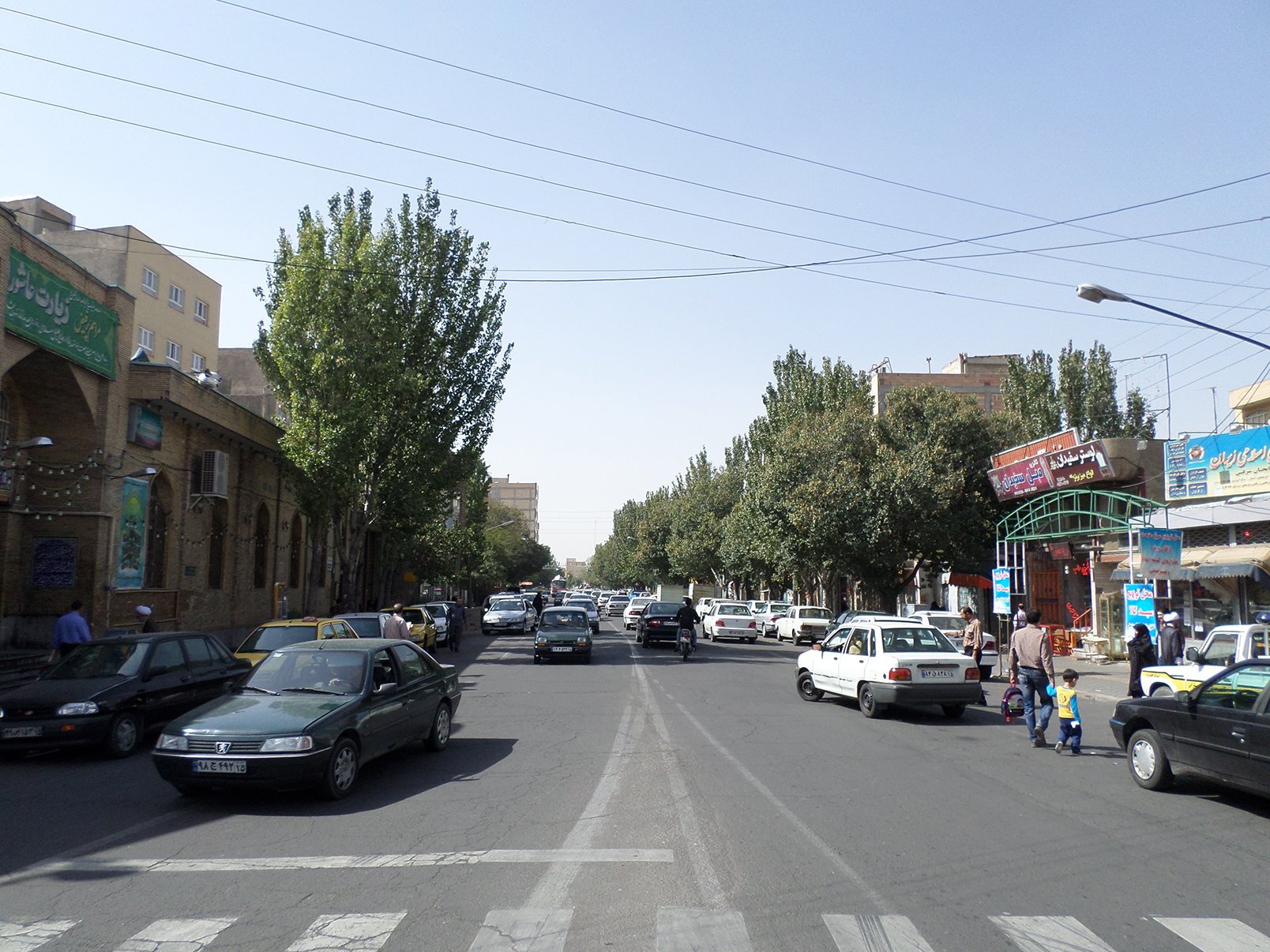

Akhini (Azerbaijani: Axını, Persian: آخینی) is a neighbourhood of Tabriz, the largest city in Iranian Azerbaijan.

Akhini is located in the northwest of Tabriz. It was originally a village near Tabriz with large farms and gardens. Due to the expansion of the city within last decades, all of Akhini's farms and gardens were the victims of the settlements and change of land use and Akhini became a part of Tabriz. Hokmavar, Sham Qazan, Jamshidabad and Qara Agaj are the neighbour districts of Akhini.
