= Bayads =

Mongol people

Bayad ᠪᠠᠶᠠᠥᠠ
Total population
- 56,573

Regions with significant populations
- Mongolia: 56,573

Languages
- Oirat

Religion
- Buddhism, Mongolian shamanism, Atheism, Christianity

Related ethnic groups
- Mongols, especially Oirats

The Bayad (Mongol: Баяд/Bayad, lit. "the Riches") is the third largest subgroup of Mongol people in modern Mongolia and they are a tribe in Four Oirats. Baya'ud were a prominent clan within the Mongol Empire. Baya'ud can be found in both Mongolic and Turkic peoples. Within Mongols, the clan is spread through Khalkha, Inner Mongolians, Buryats, and Oirats.

== History ==
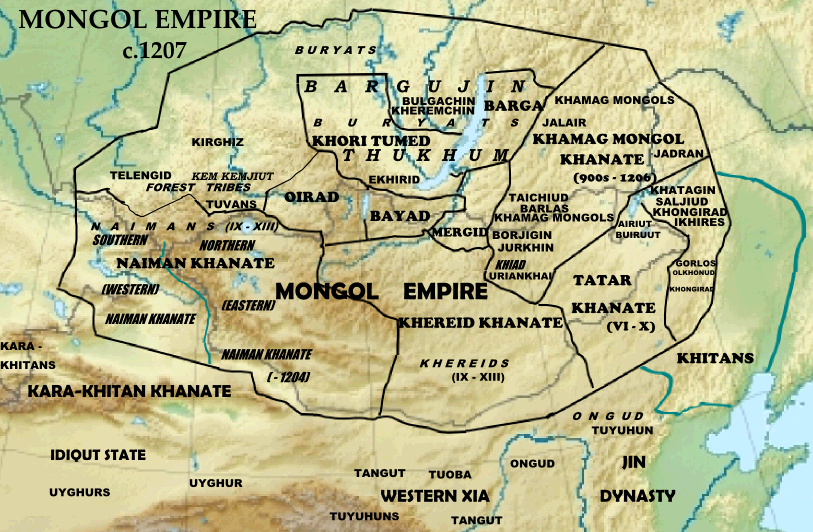
Mongol Empire c.1207

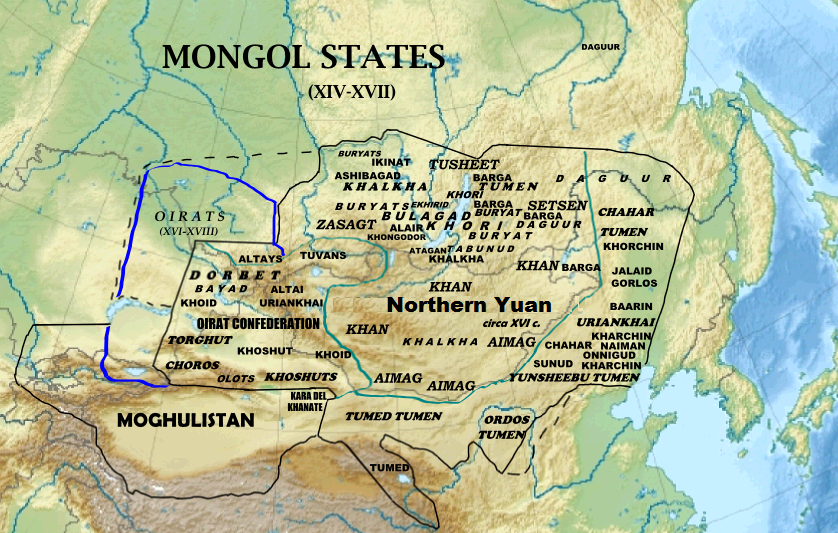
Mongol states XIV-XVII: 1. Northern Yuan dynasty 2.Four Oirat 3. Kara Del 4. Moghulistan

The clan name Baya'ud appears among the Mongols, while the ethnonym Bayid appears in Central Siberia. Only the latter appears to be connected to the modern Bayad people of western Mongolia. A common clan name does not mean common origin, the clan names Bayad and Baya'ud are differentiated. The Bayads appear to be Siberian peoples subjugated by the Dorbet tribe of the Oirats. Like all the Oirat tribes, the Bayads were not a consanguineal unit but a political-ethnographic one, formed of at least 40 different yasu, or patrilineages, of the most diverse origins.

It is also mentioned that the Bayads are presumably of Siberian Turkic origin, as the Bayad clan name is attested in Siberia from early times.

== Notable members ==
- Köke Temür - general of the Yuan dynasty
- Bulughan Khatun - favorite wife of Ilkhan Abagha
- Kököchin - principal wife of Ilkhan Ghazan, who was escorted from Khanbaliq (Beijing) to Persia by Marco Polo
- Jambyn Batmönkh - a Mongolian communist political leader, in 1984 - 1990 head of Mongolia.
- Khorloogiin Bayanmönkh - Mongolian best wrestler of the 20th century in Mongolian wrestling and 1975 freestyle wrestling world champion.
- Norovyn Altankhuyag - Prime Minister of Mongolia, 2012–2014 Democratic Party (Mongolia)
- Mishigiin Sonompil - Member of Parliament

== Modern demographics ==
Today, Bayads are settled in the districts of Khyargas, Malchin, Tes, Züüngovi, Baruunturuun, and Naranbulag in the province of Uvs. According to the census taken in 2000, 50,824 Bayads currently live in Mongolia.

== Literature ==
- [hamagmongol.narod.ru/library/khoyt_2008_r.htm Хойт С. К. Антропологические характеристики калмыков по данным исследователей XVIII-XIX вв. // Вестник Прикаспия: археология, история, этнография. № 1. Элиста: Изд-во КГУ, 2008. с. 220-243.]
- [hamagmongol.narod.ru/library/khoyt_2012_r.htm Хойт С. К. Калмыки в работах антропологов первой половины XX вв. // Вестник Прикаспия: археология, история, этнография. № 3, 2012. с. 215-245.]

== See also ==
- Bayat (tribe) (Turkic)
- Bayad tribe (India)
- Bayat tribe (Arabic)
