= Ghazan Mausoleum =

Former tomb in Tabriz, Iran

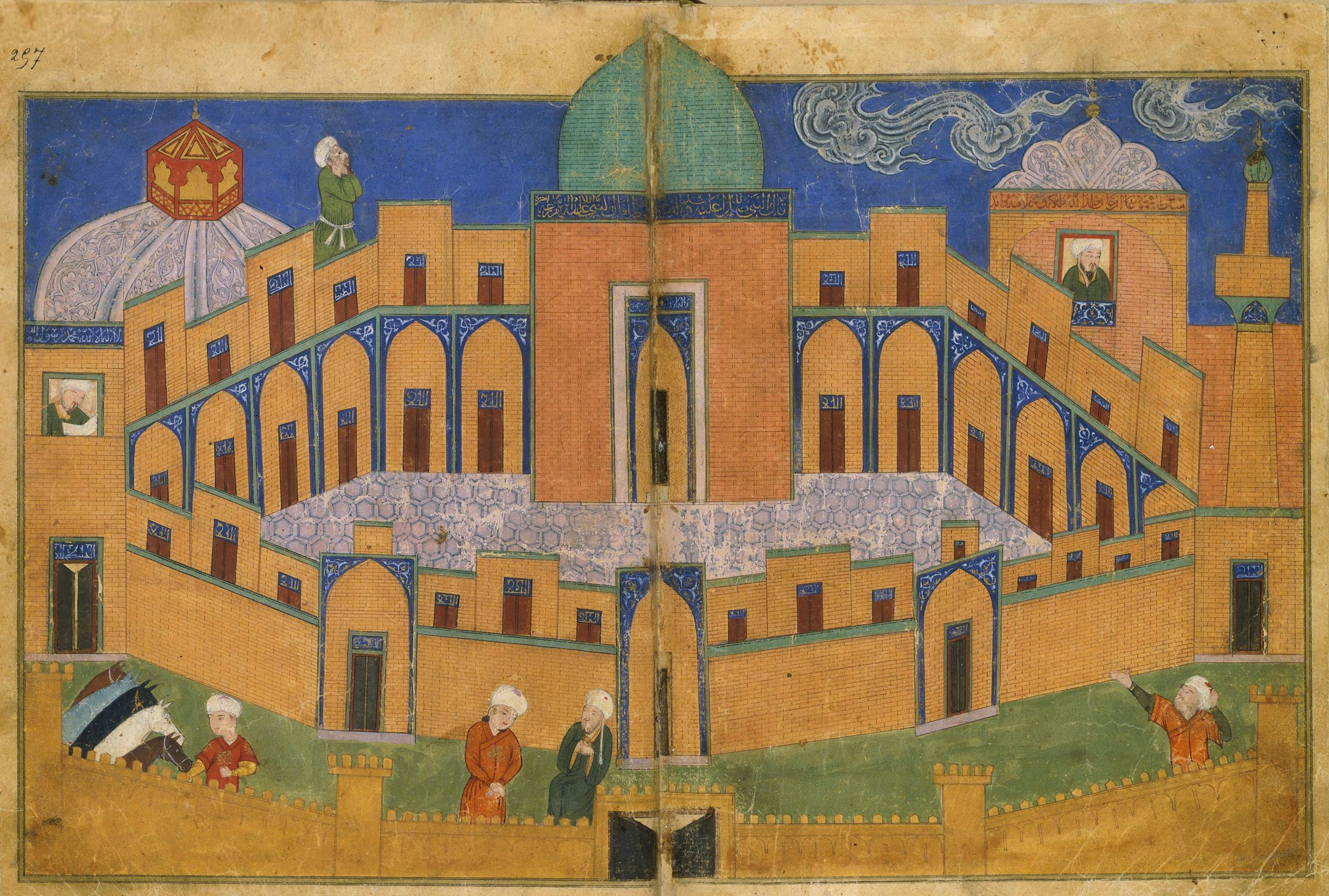
- The former mausoleum (centre), adjacent madrasa (left) and khanaqah (right). (BNF, Supplément Persan 1113 f.256v-257)

- Site of the former mausoleum in Iran

Religion
- Affiliation: Islam (former)
- Ecclesiastical or organizational status: Mausoleum (former)
- Status: Demolished

Location
- Location: Tabriz, East Azerbaijan province
- Country: Iran
- Interactive map of Ghazan Mausoleum
- Coordinates: 38°04′53″N 46°14′14″E

Architecture
- Type: Islamic architecture
- Style: Ilkhanid
- Completed: c. 1300s
- Demolished: c. 17th century

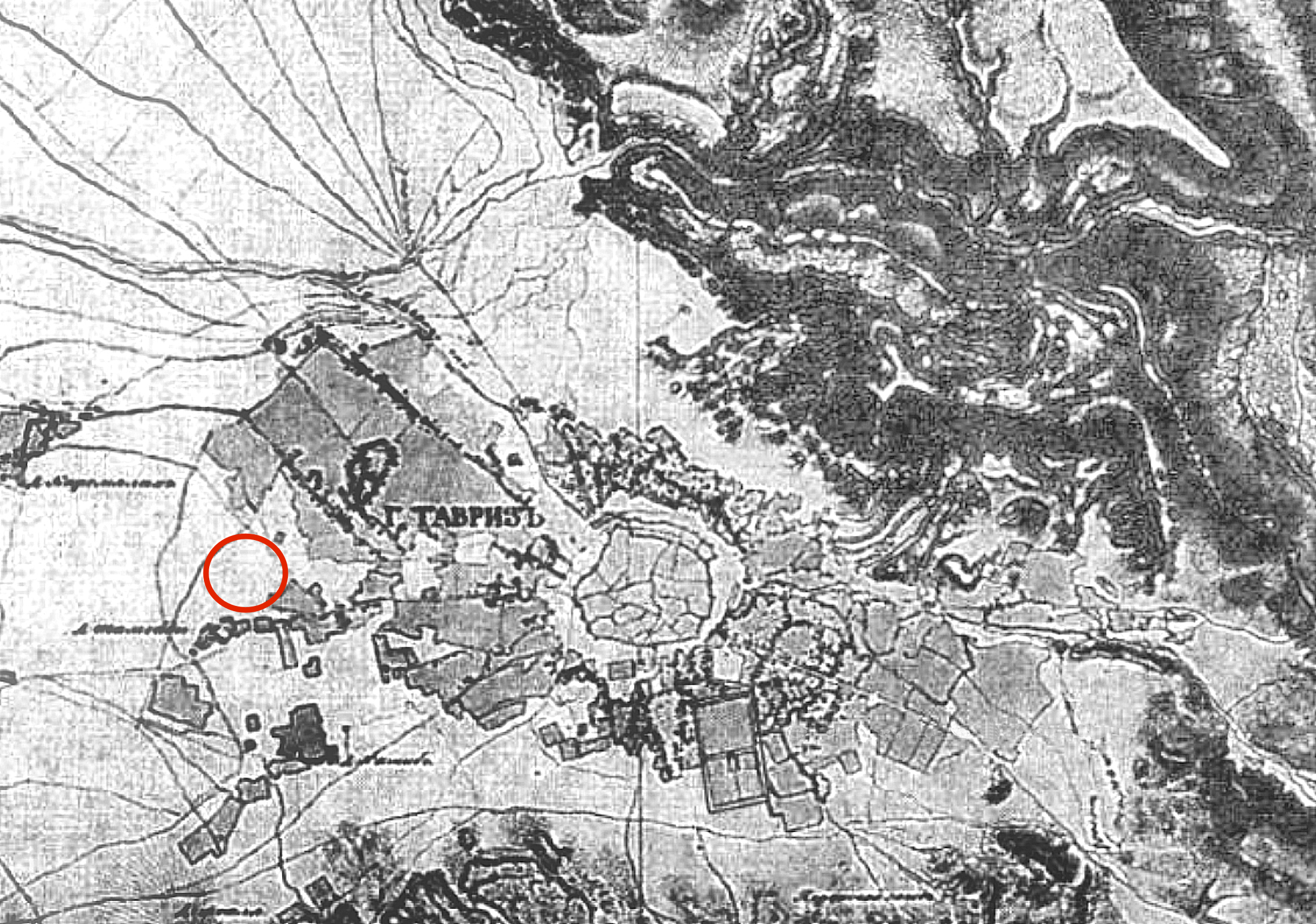
Location of the Ghazaniyya district (red circle), west of Tabriz old city.

The Ghazan Mausoleum, also known as Gunbad-i 'Âlî and the Shanb-e Ghazan, was a mausoleum complex built by Ghazan in the suburbs of his capital of Tabriz, in the province of East Azerbaijan, Iran. The structure was believed to be completed between 1295 and 1304 CE, in the Ilkhanid style. It was the first Muslim tomb to be built by an Ilkhanid ruler, who hitherto were buried in secret natural locations. Subsequently demolished, most likely during the 17th century, the area of this former monument is now known as Shanb Ghazan.

== Structure ==
The building was an expansion of construction started by his father Arghun in the Tabriz suburb of Sham ("Shanb-e Ghazan"). It became a mosque-mausoleum vaqf complex, containing religious and charitable institutions in addition to the royal mausoleum, almost forming a separate "pastoral and mausoleum city", where nomads and sedentary people could interact.

The area around the mausoleum soon became urbanized, and came to be called "Ghazaniya". The mausoleum is no longer extant, except as large tumulus, and all original buildings have disappeared.

== Literary accounts ==
The building of the mausoleum was reported in the Jami' al-tavārīkh: "He [Ghazan Khan] constructed another city larger than Old Tabriz at a place called Shamb or Sham where he built a pious foundation surrounded by many gardens and parks. This was called Ghazaniyya. Merchants from Rūm and Europe (afranj) had their goods inspected there. To avoid bad feeling, the tamghachi there were the same as those of Tabriz."

In 1386 Timur attacked Tabriz with his Chagatai army. Tabriz was captured by Timur, who encamped in Sham-Azam and levied a new tax on the inhabitants.

The author Tusi, visiting Tabriz at the time of Jahan Shah, marvelled at the beauty of the dome of the mausoleum. Ibn Battuta also visited the mausoleum: "We were lodged in a place called Shām where the tomb of Ghāzān … is located. Adjacent to this tomb is a madrasa and a khanaqah where travellers are fed".

== Cut-tile mosaics ==
In Iran, the first known example of Mo'araq complete cut-tile mosaics is the Dome of Soltaniyeh (1307-1313) during the Ilkhanid period, where the mosaic appear "in situ". Some possible fragments of cut-tile mosaic may also have been found in two slightly earlier monuments: the Ghazan Mausoleum (1295-1304), and the buildings of the Rab'-i Rashīdī (before 1318).

== Depictions ==
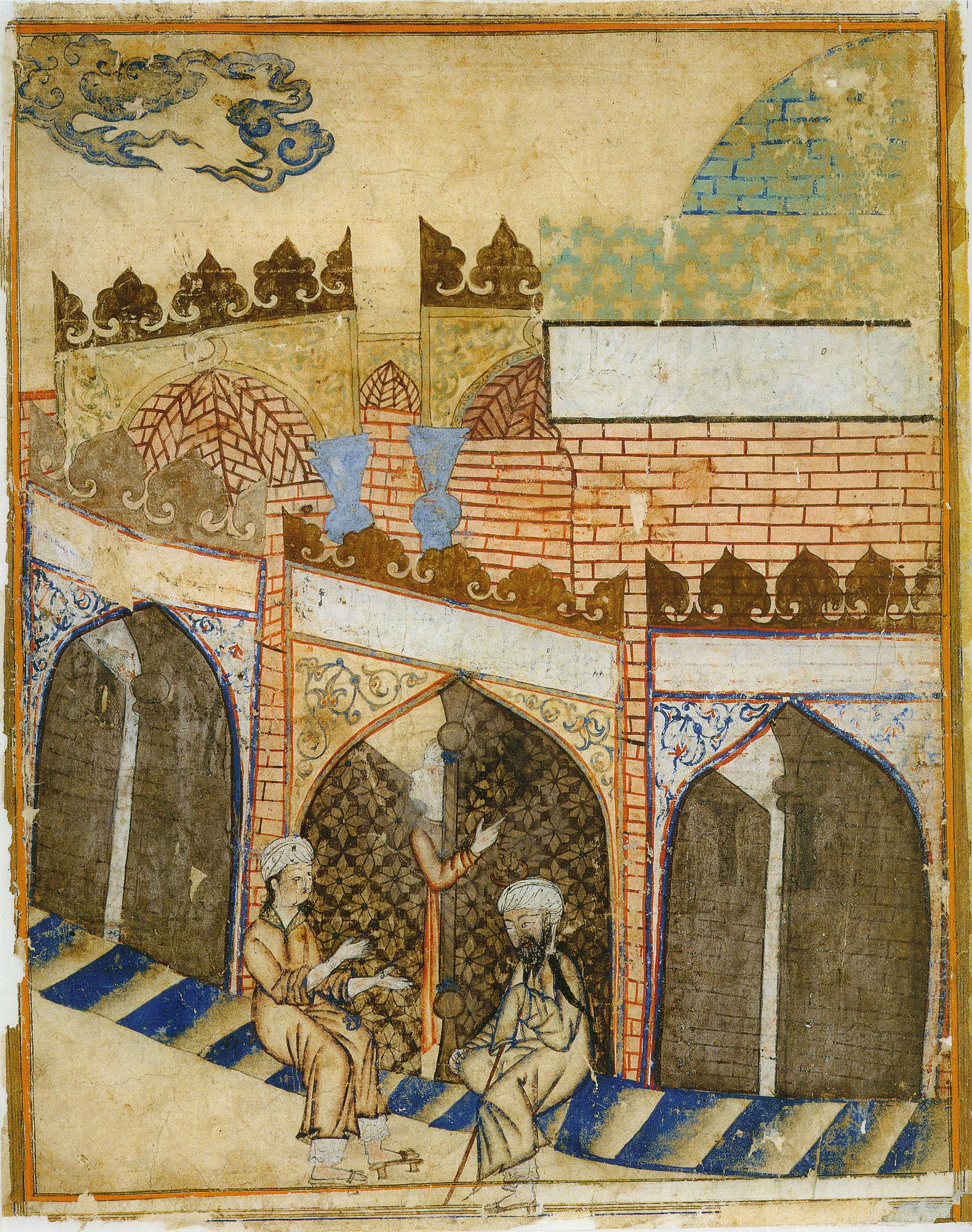
The mausoleum in the Diez Album (1st quarter of the 14th century)

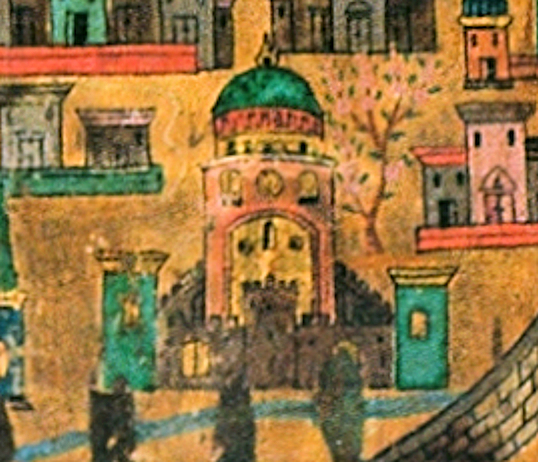
Matrakçı Nasuh map of Tabriz in 1538, with the mausoleum

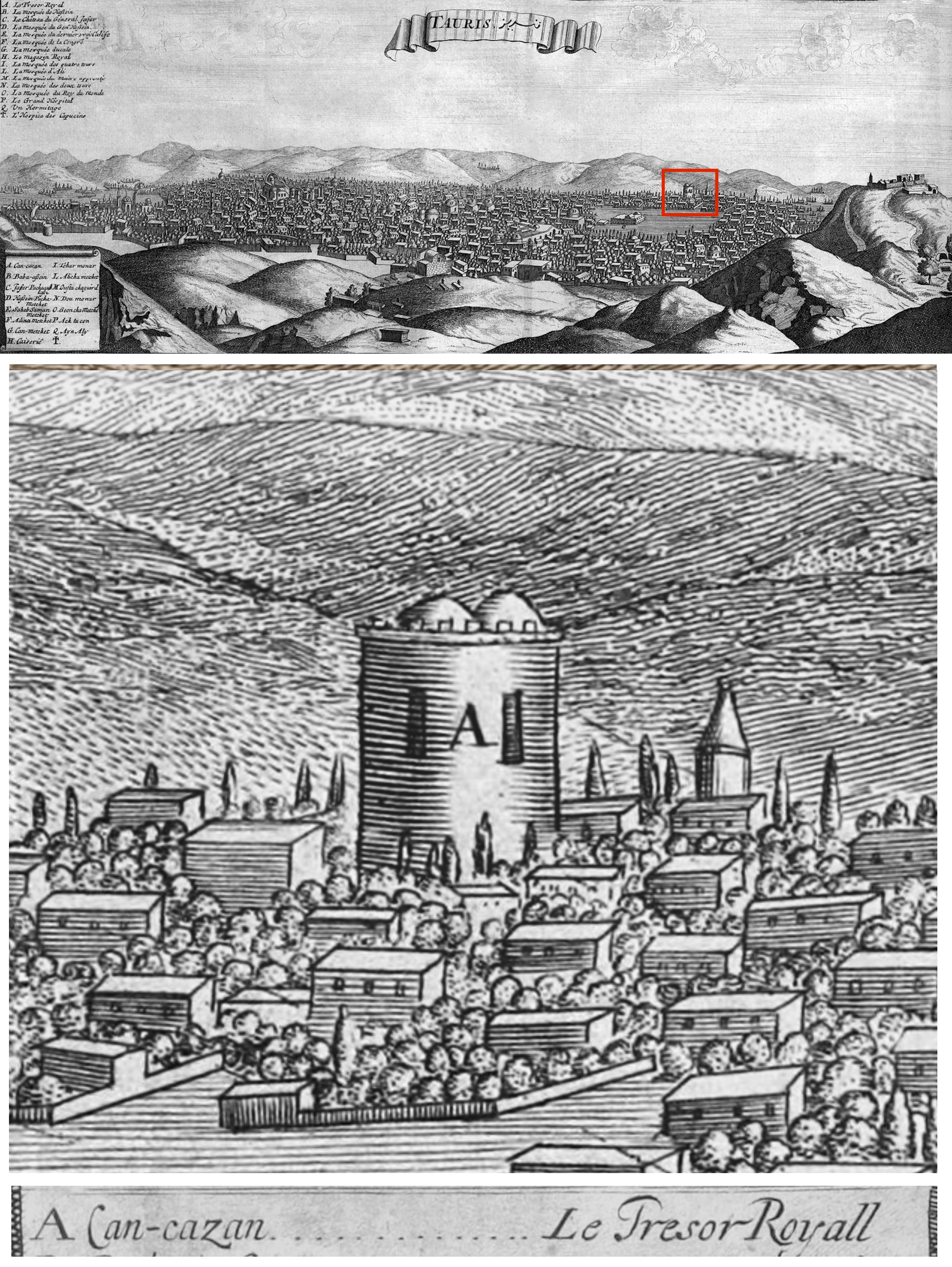
Jean Chardin etching of Tabriz in 1673, with ruins of the mausoleum

== See also ==
- List of mausoleums in Iran
- Islam in Iran

== Sources ==
- Bloom, Jonathan M. (2006). Beyond the legacy of Genghis Khan (The transformative medium in Ilkhanid art). Leiden; Boston: Brill. ISBN 978-9004150836.
- Bosworth, C. Edmund (August 31, 2007). Historic Cities of the Islamic World. BRILL. ISBN 978-90-474-2383-6.
