= Behruz Heschmat =

Iranian-Austrian sculptor (born 1953)

- Born: 22 October 1953 (age 71); Tabriz, East Azerbaijan, Imperial State of Iran
- Education: University of Applied Arts
- Known for: Sculpture

Behruz Heschmat (born 22 October 1953 in Tabriz) is an Iranian-Austrian sculptor. He lives and works in Vienna, Austria in exile since 1983.

== Biography ==
Heschmat has studied art in the University of Applied Arts in Vienna with Wander Bertoni during 1976–1982. Prior to that he was a sculptor in Tabriz and Tehran between 1970–1976. His works have been exhibited in several exhibitions in Iran and Europe, including Germany. He has several outdoor sculptures in Tabriz and Vienna. Among his works in Tabriz public places are Ashiq statue and Work and Though sculpture in Mashin Sazi factory square in Qaramalik neighbourhood of Tabriz.

Immigration and exile are at the heart of his works, e.g., in his Tree House Series.
