= Kököchin =

Mongol Ilkhanate princess from the Yuan dynasty in China

Kököchin Khatun

Khatun of Ilkhanate Empire
- Tenure: 1293–1296
- Predecessor: Buluqhan Khatun
- Next: Uljay Qutlugh Khatun
- Died: June 1296
- Spouse: Ghazan Khan
- House: Bayaut

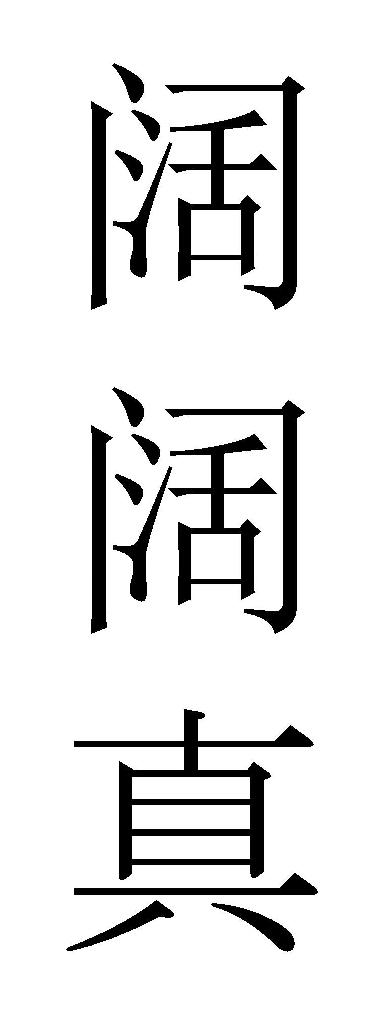
Chinese characters for Kököchin.

Kököchin, also Kökejin, Kūkājīn, Cocacin or Cozotine (Mongolian: ᠬᠥᠬᠴᠢᠨ Хөхчин; Chinese: 闊闊真; pinyin: kuò kuò zhēn), was a 13th-century princess of the Mongol-led Chinese Yuan dynasty, belonging to the Mongol Bayaut tribe. In 1291, she was betrothed to the Ilkhanate khan Arghun by the Yuan founding emperor Kublai, but eventually was married to his son Ghazan when Arghun died by the time she arrived in Persia in 1293. The account of Kököchin's journey to Persia was given by Marco Polo, who was part of her entourage.

== Name ==
Among the various English translations of Polo's book, there are at least ten spellings for her name. Absent various accented characters here, the names include Cocachin, Cocacin, Cozotine, Kogatin, Kokachin, Kokechin, Kokejin, Kokochin, Kukachin, and Kukajin.

"Kökö" may mean "blue" (especially "sky blue", cf. *kȫk) or "dark" as in complexion, and "chin" or "jin" a suffix used for the name of a person. The name "Kököchin" may therefore be translated as "The Dark Complected".

The name could also be a corruption of kȫkerčin, which means dove or pigeon.

== Background ==
Following the loss of Arghun's favourite wife Bolgana ("Zibeline"), Arghun sent a request to his grand-uncle Kublai Khan to send him a relative of his dead wife, saying that only one of her kinswomen should succeed her. Kublai chose the 17-year-old Kököchin.

Kublai, from his capital of Khanbaliq (the Khan's city, modern day Beijing) entrusted Marco Polo with his last duty, to escort princess Kökechin to Arghun along with three envoys, Oulatai, Apusca, and Coja. The party travelled by sea, departing from the southern port city of Quanzhou in the spring of 1291. There were 14 big ships in all, and each had 4 masts and 12 sails. They set out from Quanzhou, sailing to Sumatra where they were delayed for five months due to weather, and then to Persia, via Sri Lanka and India (where his visits included Mylapore, Madurai, and Alleppey). They arrived around 1293.

Arghun had died in the meantime however, and Kököchin married Arghun's son Ghazan and became his principal wife. She died in June 1296.

== Accounts ==
There are three sources for the account of the mission to Persia – a passage in the Chinese work Yongle Encyclopedia (which however does not mention the princess), the Persian Jami' al-tawarikh written by Rashid-al-Din Hamadani, with the most detailed description given by Marco Polo:

Arghun Khan of Persia, Kublai's great-nephew, had in 1286 lost his favourite wife the Khatun Bulughan; and, mourning her sorely, took steps to fulfil her dying injunction that her place should be filled only by a lady of her own kin, the Mongol Tribe of Bayaut. Ambassadors were despatched to the Court of Khan-baligh to seek such a bride. The message was courteously received, and the choice fell on the lady Kokachin, a maiden of 17, "moult bele dame et avenant (very beautiful lady and comely)." The overland road from Peking to Tabriz was not only of portentous length for such a tender charge, but was imperiled by war, so the envoys desired to return by sea. Tartars in general were strangers to all navigation; and the envoys, much taken with the Venetians, and eager to profit by their experience, especially as Marco had just then returned from his Indian mission, begged the Khan as a favour to send the three Firinghis in their company. He consented with reluctance, but, having done so, fitted the party out nobly for the voyage, charging the Polos with friendly messages for the potentates of Europe, including the King of England. They appear to have sailed from the port of Zayton (as the Westerns called T'swan-chau or Chin-cheu in Fo-kien) in the beginning of 1292. It was an ill-starred voyage, involving long detentions on the coast of Sumatra, and in the South of India, to which, however, we are indebted for some of the best chapters in the book; and two years or upwards passed before they arrived at their destination in Persia. The three hardy Venetians survived all perils, and so did the lady, who had come to look on them with filial regard; but two of the three envoys, and a vast proportion of the suite, had perished by the way. Arghun Khan too had been dead even before they quitted China; his brother Kaikhatu reigned in his stead; and his son Ghazan succeeded to the lady's hand. We are told by one who knew both the princes well that Arghun was one of the handsomest men of his time, whilst Ghazan was, among all his host, one of the most insignificant in appearance. But in other respects the lady's change was for the better. Ghazan had some of the highest qualities of a soldier, a legislator and a king, adorned by many and varied accomplishments; though his reign was too short for the full development of his fame.

— The Travels of Marco Polo

The account of the marriage was confirmed by the Persian historian Rashid-al-Din Hamadani in his Jami' al-tawarikh where she was named Kūkājīn.
