= Buluqhan Khatun =

13th-century Mongol princess and principal wife of Ilkhanid ruler, Abaqa

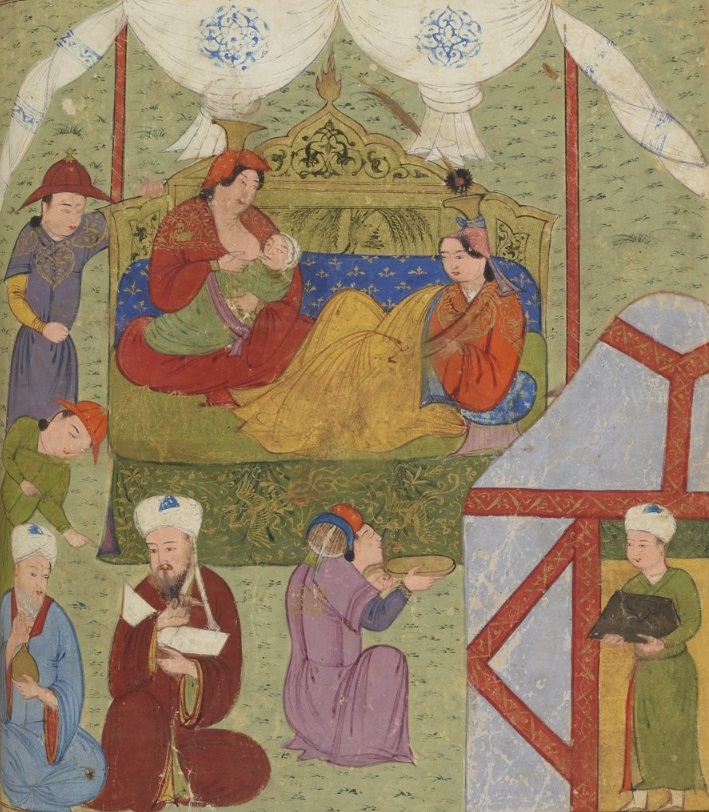
- Buluqhan Khatun's step-grandson Ghazan being breastfed. Rashid al-Din, early 14th century

Khatun of Ilkhanate Empire
- Tenure: 1265–1286
- Predecessor: Doquz Khatun
- Next: Kököchin
- Died: 20 April 1286; Kor River, Ilkhanate
- Burial: Soltaniyeh, Ilkhanate
- Consort of: Abaqa Khan; Arghun Khan
- Issue: Malika Khatun
- House: Bayaut (by birth); Borjigin (by marriage)

Buluqhan Khatun (Chinese: 卜魯罕; Mongolian:ᠪᠦᠯᠭᠠᠨ , lit. 'Sable'), also Bulughan, Bulukhan, Bolgana, Bulugan, Zibeline or Bolghara for Marco Polo, was a 13th-century Mongol princess, and the principal wife of the Mongol Ilkhanid ruler Abaqa (1234–1282).

== Life ==
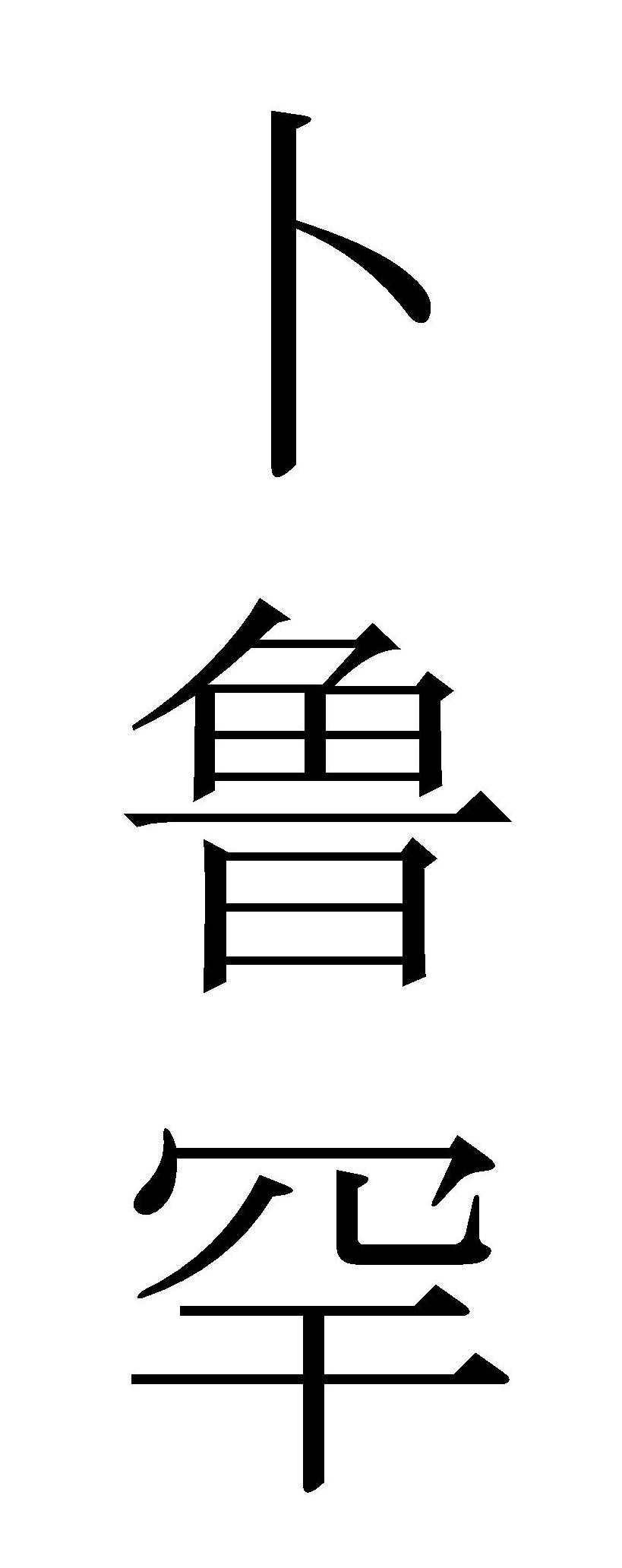
Chinese ideograms for princess "Buluqhan".

She belonged to the Mongol tribe of the Bayaut (also Baya'ud, Chinese: 伯牙吾). She was married to Abaqa Khan as his ninth wife. As a khatun, she was very influential in the Ilkhanid court. She once saved a vizier's life, in September 1282 . She was wed to Arghun in a levirate marriage after Abaqa's death in 1282. Her influence even reached Tekudar's court, who treated her with due respect.

== Family ==
She had Malika Khatun with Abaqa, who was married to Tohjam Buqa, son of Nogai Yarghuchi. Though sonless herself, she raised her step-grandsons (by Abaqa's son Arghun) Ghazan and Öljeitü, both of whom later succeeded Arghun, and eventually converted to Islam. Arghun had Öljeitü baptized at birth, and gave him the name "Nicholas" after Pope Nicholas IV.

== Death and aftermath ==
She died on 20 April 1286 by the Kor River. After her death, Arghun asked Kublai Khan to send him one of Bulughan's relatives as a new bride. The choice fell to Kökötchin ("Blue, or Celestial, Dame"), who was escorted by Marco Polo on her journey from Kaan-baligh (Beijing). The party traveled by sea, departing from the southern port city of Quanzhou and sailing to Sumatra, and then to Persia, via Sri Lanka and India. They arrived in 1293; however, Arghun had been killed before her arrival by conspirators, so Kökötchin married Arghun's son Ghazan, becoming his principal wife.

There were other Buluqhan Khatun who was married to Arghun after her death.
