= Gualterius de Lavendel =

French diplomat

Gualterius de Lavendel was an ambassador of the king Charles II of Anjou to the Mongol ruler Ghazan. He went to Persia to visit Ghazan, and arrived there after 27 April 1303. The embassy followed the 1302 Peace of Caltabellotta which ended the conflict between Anjou and Aragon in the Mediterranean.
