= Bayad tribe =

Bayad
Regions with significant populations
- Aravalli district, India, Pakistan

Languages
- Kutchi, Sindhi, Gujarati

Religion
- Islam

Related ethnic groups
- Muslim Rajputs, Samma

The Bayad are a Muslim community found in the state of Gujarat Kutch in India, as well as parts of Pakistan.
