= Ghazan =

Ruler of the Mongol Ilkhanate from 1295 to 1304

- Khan; Pâdeshâh of Iran and Islam
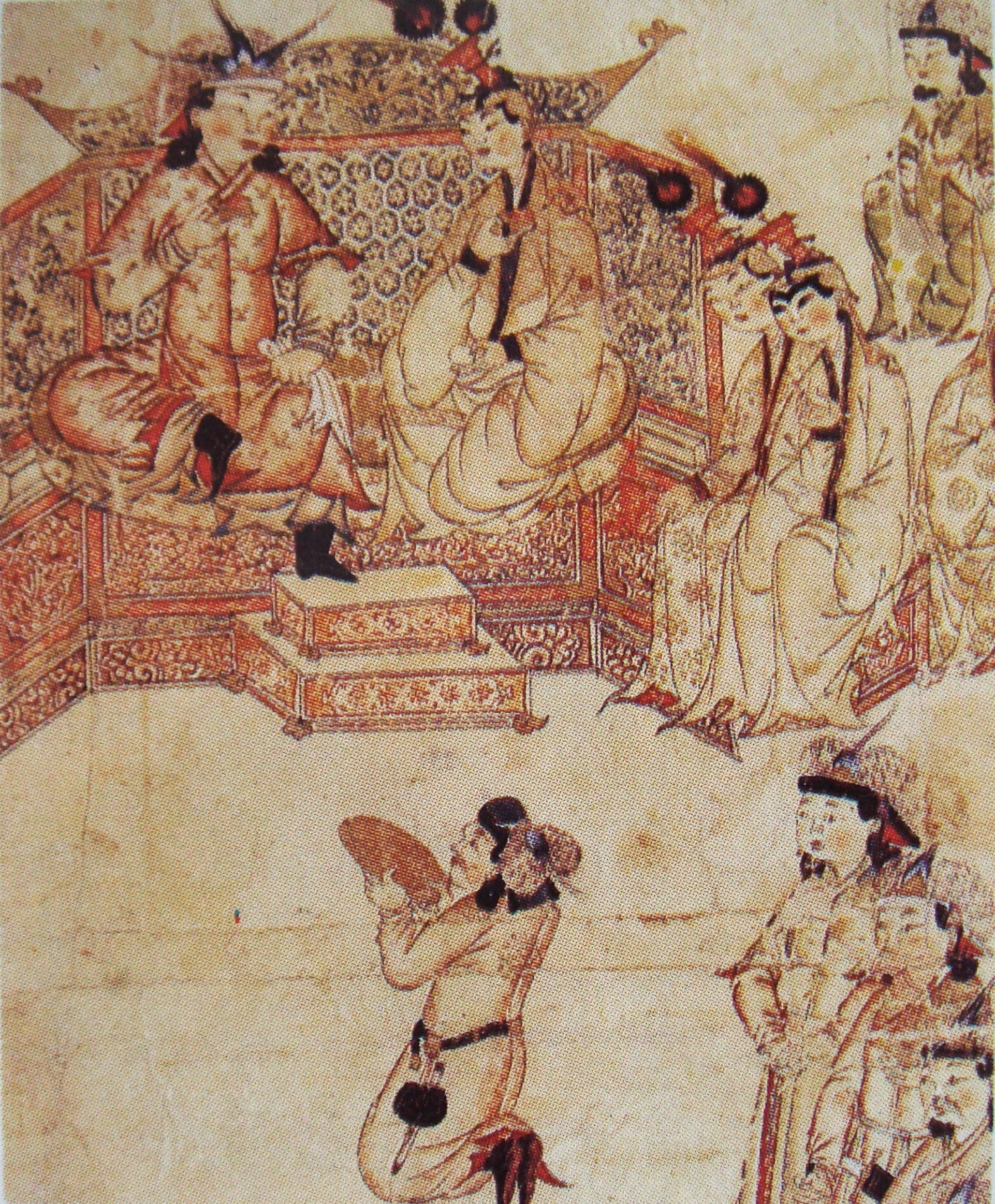
- Ghazan with wife at his court

Il khan
- Reign: 4 October 1295 – 11 May 1304
- Coronation: 19 October 1295
- Predecessor: Baydu
- Successor: Öljeitü
- Naib: Nawruz

Viceroy of Khorasan
- Reign: 1284–1295
- Predecessor: Arghun
- Successor: Nirun Aqa
- Born: 5 November 1271; Abaskun, Ilkhanate
- Died: 11 May 1304 (aged 32); Qazvin, Ilkhanate
- Burial: Ghazan Mausoleum, Tabriz
- Consort: Yedi Kurtka Khatun; Bulughan Khatun Khurasani; Kököchin; Bulughan Khatun Muazzama; Eshil Khatun; Dondi Khatun; Karamun Khatun; Khutulun
- Issue: Uljay Qutlugh Khatun
Names
- Mahmud Ghazan
- House: Borjigin
- Dynasty: Hulaguid
- Father: Arghun
- Mother: Kultak Egechi
- Religion: Nestorian Christianity (until 1295); Sunni Islam (after 1295)

Mahmud Ghazan (Note: Mongolian: Газан, ᠭᠠᠵᠠᠨ ᠬᠠᠨ, romanized: Gazan, Persian: غازان خان, romanized: Ġāzān xān.) (also Ghazan Khan, sometimes westernized as Casanus; 5 November 1271 – 11 May 1304) was the seventh ruler of the Ilkhanate from 1295 to 1304, the division of the Mongol Empire based in modern-day Iran. He was the son of Arghun, grandson of Abaqa Khan and great-grandson of Hulegu Khan, continuing a long line of rulers who were direct descendants of Genghis Khan. Considered the most prominent of the Ilkhans, he is perhaps best known for converting to Islam in 1295 upon taking the throne, marking a turning point for the dominant religion of the Mongols in West Asia.

Military conflicts during Ghazan's reign included a campaign in the Levant against the Mamluk Sultanate, successfully taking Damascus on 30 December 1299, and battles with the Turko-Mongol Chagatai Khanate. Ghazan, a contemporary of Philip the Fair, also pursued diplomatic contacts with Europe, continuing his father's unsuccessful attempts at forming a Franco-Mongol alliance. A man of high culture, Ghazan spoke multiple languages, had many hobbies, and reformed many elements of the Ilkhanate, especially in the matter of standardizing currency and fiscal policy.

One of his many principal wives was Kököchin, a Mongol princess (originally betrothed to Ghazan's father Arghun before his death) sent by his great-uncle Kublai Khan.

== Childhood ==
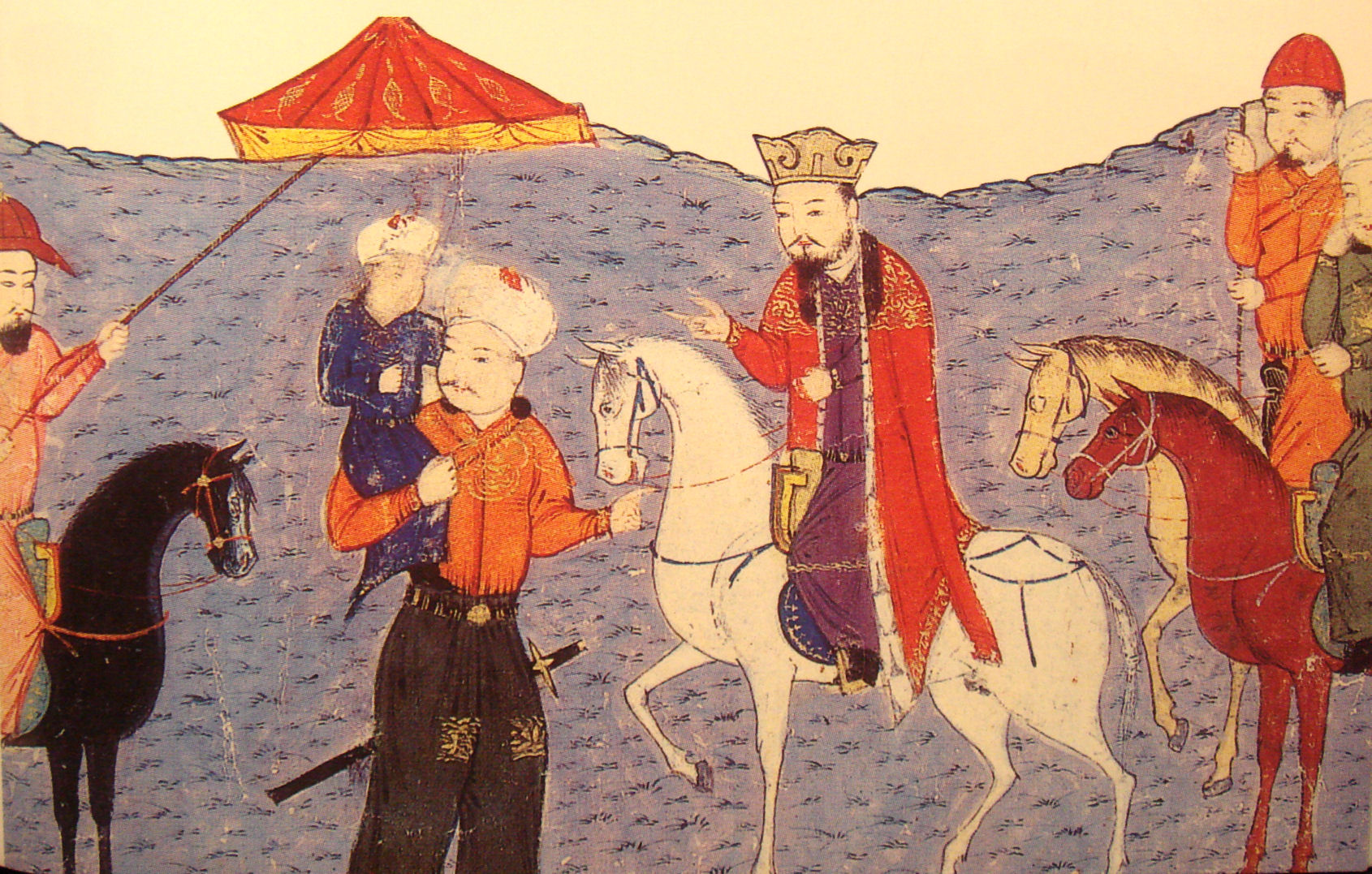
Ghazan as a child, in the arms of his father Arghun, standing next to Arghun's father Abaqa, mounted on a horse

Ghazan's parents were Arghun and his concubine Kultak Egechi of the Dörböd. At the time of their marriage, Arghun was 12. Kultak's elder sister Ashlun was the wife of Tübshin, son of Hulagu and the previous viceroy in Greater Khorasan. According to Rashid al-Din Hamadani, the marriage took place in Mazandaran, where Arghun was viceroy.

Ghazan was born on 5 November 1271 in Abaskun (now near Bandar Torkaman), although he was raised in the nomadic palace of the orda of his grandfather Abaqa's favorite wife, Buluqhan Khatun, who herself was childless. Ghazan and Arghun didn't see each other until Abaqa's attack on Qara'unas in 1279, when they briefly met.

Ghazan was raised an Eastern Christian, as was his brother Öljaitü. The Mongols were traditionally tolerant of multiple religions, and during Ghazan's youth, he was educated by a Chinese Buddhist monk, who taught him Old Mandarin and Buddhism, as well as the Mongolian and Uighur scripts.

=== Under Tekuder ===
He lived together with Gaykhatu in Buluqhan Khatun's encampment in Baghdad after Abaqa's death. He reunited again with his father when Buluqhan Khatun was wed to Arghun and became Ghazan's step-mother.

== Rule in Khorasan ==
=== Under Arghun ===
After the overthrow of Tekuder in 1284, Ghazan's father Arghun was enthroned as Ilkhan, the 11-year-old Ghazan became viceroy, and he moved to the capital of Khorasan, never to see Arghun again. Emir Tegene was appointed as his deputy, who he didn't like very much. In 1289, conflict with other Mongols ensued when a revolt was led against Arghun by Nawruz, a young emir of the Oirat clan, whose father had been civil governor of Persia before the arrival of Hulegu. Ghazan's deputy Tegene was among the victims of Nawruz's raid on 20 April 1289 in which he was captured and imprisoned. Nawruz's protege, Prince Hulachu was arrested by Ghazan's commander Mulay ten days later. When Nawruz was defeated by Arghun's reinforcements in 1290, he fled the Ilkhanate and joined the alliance of Kaidu, another descendant of Genghis Khan who was the ruler of both the House of Ögedei and the neighboring Chagatai Khanate. Ghazan spent the next ten years defending the frontier of the Ilkhanate against incursions by the Chagatai Khanate of Central Asia.

=== Under Gaykhatu ===
When his father, Arghun, died in 1291, Ghazan was prevented from pursuing his claim of leadership in the capital because he was engaged both with Nawruz's raids, and dealing with rebellion and famine in Khorasan and Nishapur. Taghachar, an army commander who had served the previous three generations of Ilkhans, was probably behind the death of Arghun, and supported Ghazan's uncle Gaykhatu as the new Ilkhan. Despite being boyhood rivals, Gaykhatu sent aid to Ghazan's fight against Nawruz in Khorasan under the leadership of Prince Anbarchi (son of Möngke Temür) and emirs Tuladai, Quncuqbal and El Temür; himself going to Anatolia to quell Turcoman uprisings. However, famine reached his court too in spring and Anbarchi, unable to feed his soldiers, had to leave soon for Azerbaijan again. He again tried to visit Gaykhatu, but after his refusal, he had to go back. Ghazan received Kököchin, a Mongol princess from the Yuan dynasty in China, on his way back from Tabriz to Khorasan. She had been brought from the east in a caravan which included Marco Polo among hundreds of other travellers. She had originally been betrothed to Ghazan's father, IlKhan Arghun, but since he had died during her months-long journey, she instead married his son Ghazan.

In 1294, Ghazan forced Nawruz to surrender at Nishapur and Nawruz then became one of Ghazan's lieutenants. Ghazan was loyal to his uncle, though he refused to follow Gaykhatu's lead in introducing paper currency to his province, explaining that the weather of Khorasan was too humid to handle paper.

=== Against Baydu ===
In 1295, Taghachar and his conspirators, who probably had been behind the death of Arghun, had his successor Gaykhatu killed as well. They then placed the pliable Baydu, a cousin of Ghazan, on the throne. Baydu was primarily a figurehead, allowing the conspirators to divide the Ilkhanate among themselves. Hearing of Gaykhatu's murder, Ghazan marched on Baydu. Baydu explained that Ghazan was away during the events leading to Gaykhatu's fall, therefore nobles had no choice but to raise him to throne. Nevertheless, Nawruz encouraged Ghazan to take steps against Baydu, because he was nothing but a figurehead under grips of nobles. Baydu's forces commanded by Ildar (his cousin and Prince Ajay's son), Eljidei and Chichak met him near Qazvin. Ghazan's army were commanded by Prince Sogai (son of Yoshmut), Buralghi, Nawruz, Qutluqshah and Nurin Aqa. The first battle was won by Ghazan but he had to fall back after realising that Ildar's contingent was just a fraction of the whole army he faced, leaving Nawruz behind. Nevertheless, he captured Arslan, a descendant of Jochi Qasar.

==== Conversion to Islam ====
After a short truce, Baydu offered Ghazan co-rulership of the Ilkhanate and offered Nawruz the post of sahib-i divan to which as a counter-condition Ghazan demanded the revenues of his father's hereditary lands in Fars, Persian Iraq and Kerman. Nawruz refused these conditions, which led to his arrest. According to an anecdote, he promised to bring Ghazan back tied up on condition of his release. Once he reached Ghazan, he sent back a cauldron to Baydu; a word play on the Turkish word kazan. Nawruz promised him the throne and his help on condition of Ghazan's conversion to Islam. Ghazan converted to Sunni Islam, on June 16, 1295, at the hands of Ibrahim ibn Muhammad ibn al-Mu'ayyid ibn Hamaweyh al-Khurasani al-Juwayni as a condition for Nawruz's military support.

Before converting to Islam based on a political agreement, Ghazan, a neo-Muslim, married his stepmother Bulughan Khatun Muazzema after his father's death, in accordance with the Mongol pagan Yasa customs. After being informed that it was forbidden by Islamic law, he ignored it and broke the agreement by leaving Islam, leading to the massacre of Syrian Muslims and the conversion of millions of neo-Muslim Tatars in his kingdom to their former religion. In order to dissuade him from doing so, some jurists, considering Maslaha, temporarily considered the marriage legal and encouraged him to remain in Islam, thus saving him from the great harm of Muslim genocide and apostasy and giving Ghazan a long time and opportunity to realize his mistake, so he remained in Islam.

Nawruz entered Qazvin with 4,000 soldiers and claimed an additional number of 120,000 soldiers commanded by Ebügen (in other sources, 30,000) – descendant of Jochi Qasar – on his way towards Azerbaijan which caused panic among masses which was followed by defections of Taghachar's subordinates (thanks to Taghachar's vizier Sadr ul-Din Zanjani) and other powerful emirs like Qurumishi and Chupan on 28 August 1295.

Seeing imminent defeat, Baydu asked for Taghachar's support, ignorant of his defection. After realising Taghachar's withdrawal, he fled to Emir Tukal in Georgia on 26 September 1295. Ghazan's commanders found him near Nakhchivan and arrested him, taking back to Tabriz, having him executed on October 4, 1295.

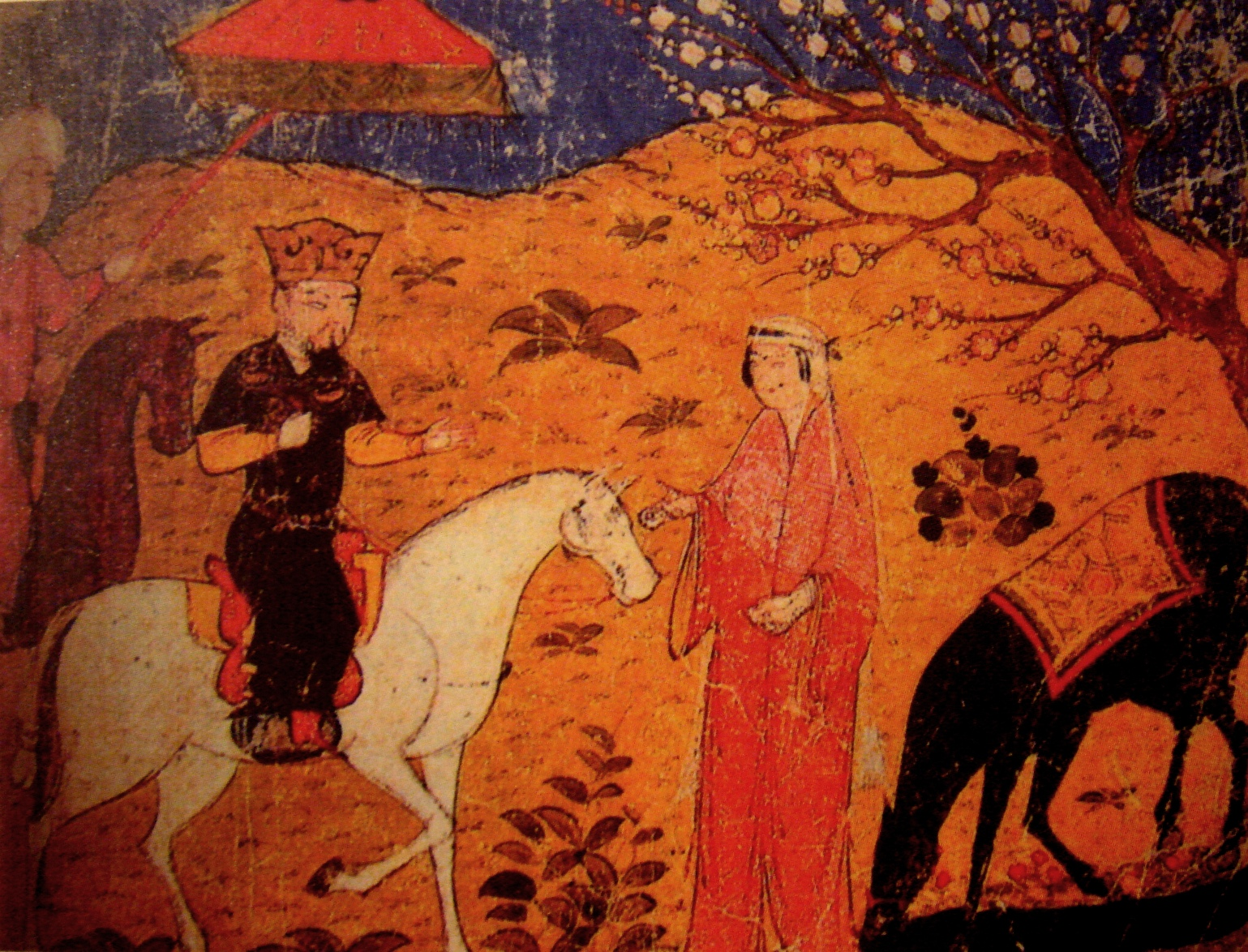
Ghazan mounted on a horse.

== Early reign ==
Ghazan declared his victory after the execution of Baydu on the outskirts of Tabriz on 4 October 1295, he entered the city. After this declaration, several appointments, orders and executions came as usual – Gaykhatu's son Alafrang's son-in-law Eljidai Qushchi was executed, Nawrūz was rewarded with naʾibate of state and was given extreme power, akin to Buqa's back in the day of Arghun. Nawrūz, on his part, issued a formal edict in opposition to other religions in the Ilkhanate. Nawruz loyalists persecuted Buddhists and Christians to such an extent that Buddhism in Iran never recovered, the Church of the East cathedral in the Mongol capital of Maragheh was looted, and churches in Tabriz and Hamadan were destroyed.

Baydu loyalists too were purged – emirs Jirghadai and Qonchuqbal were executed on 10 and 15 October respectively. Qonchuqbal was specifically hated for his murder of Aq Buqa Jalair, his executioner was Nawrūz's brother Hajji, who was also Aq Buqa's son-in-law. Taghachar's protege, Sadr al-Din Zanjani was granted the office of vizier following deposition of Baydu's vizier, Jamal al-Din. He reappointed Taghachar to the Anatolian viceroyalty on 10 November 1295. Another series of executions came after 1296: Prince Ajai's son Ildar fled to Anatolia on 6 February but was captured and executed; Yesütai, an Oirat commander who supported Hulegu's son-in-law Taraghai, in his migration to Mamluk Sultanate Syria, was executed on 24 May and Buralghi Qiyatai, a commander who was rebellious against Arghun was executed on 12 February.

Meanwhile, Nogai Khan, kingmaker in the Golden Horde, was murdered and his wife Chubei fled to Ghazan with his son Torai (or Büri) who was Abaqa's son-in-law in 1296.

=== Purge of nobles ===
Ghazan eased the troubles with the Golden Horde, but the House of Ögedei and Chagatais of Central Asia continued to pose a serious threat to both the Ilkhanate and his overlord and ally to the Great Khan in China. When Ghazan was crowned, the Chagatai khan Duwa invaded Khorasan on 9 December 1295. Ghazan sent two of his relatives, Prince Sogai (son of Yoshmut) and Esen Temür (son of Qonqurtai), against the army of Chagatai Khanate, but they deserted, believing this was Nawrūz's plot to further deprive the nobility of their possessions. Nawrū informed Ghazan of this plot, subsequently executing them in 1296. Another Borjigid prince, Arslan who was captured by Ghazan previously and pardoned, revolted in Bilasuvar. After a series of battles near Baylaqan he too was captured and executed, along with the rebellious emirs on 29 March.

Following the purge of princes, Taghachar was thought to have been implicated in the rebellion of Prince Sogai and was declared a rebel. Taghachar strengthened himself in Tokat and resisted against Ghazan's commanders Harmanji, Baltu and Arap (son of Samagar). He was soon arrested by Baltu near Delice and was delivered to Ghazan in 1296. Shortly afterwards Ghazan reluctantly ordered the murder of Taghachar; he recognised that he had been a help and that he was not an imminent threat, and explained his decision by reference to a Chinese story about the execution of a commander who saved a future emperor by betraying a former one. His protege Sadr ul-Din Zanjani was revoked from the vizierate and arrested in March 1296, but pardoned thanks to the intervention of Buluqhan Khatun.

The purges were followed by the executions of Chormaqan's grandson Baighut on 7 September 1296, Hazaraspid ruler Afrasiab I in October 1296, Baydu's vizier Jamal ud-Din Dastgerdani on 27 October 1296.

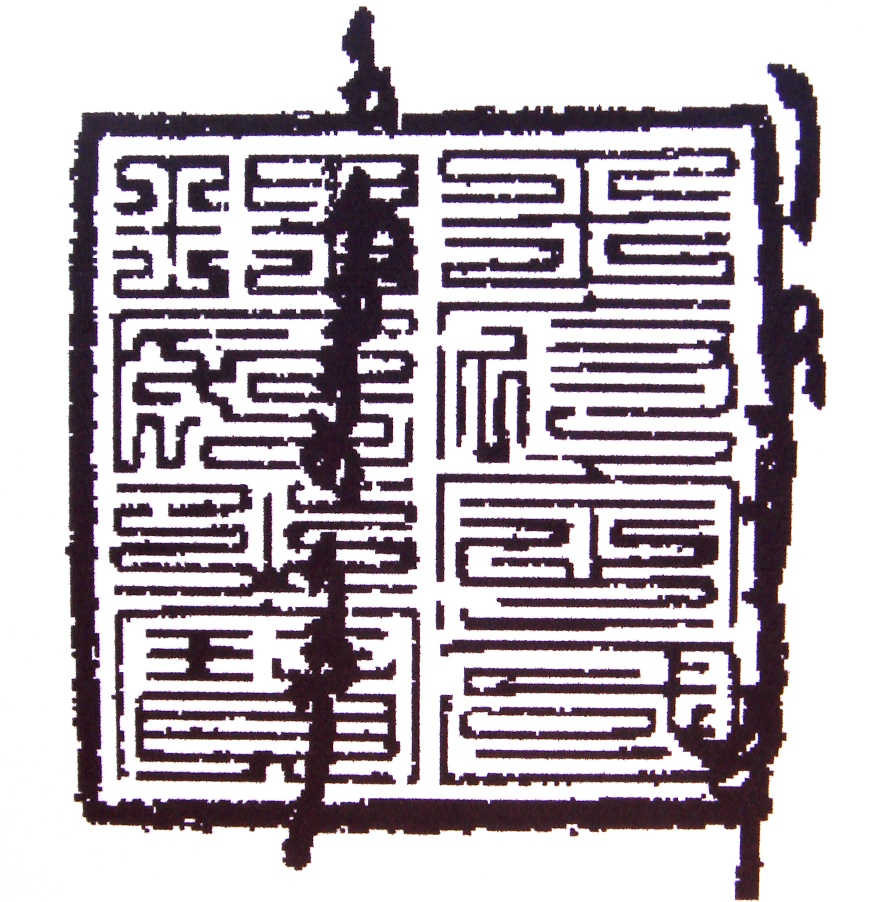
Seal of Mahmud Ghazan, over the last two lines of his 1302 letter to Pope Boniface VIII. The seal was given to Ghazan by the sixth Great Khan (Emperor ChengZong of Yuan). It is in Chinese script: "王府定國理民之寶", which means "Seal certifying the authority of his Royal Highness to establish a country and govern its people". Overwritten on it vertically, are two lines in Mongolian using the old, Aramaic-based, Uyghur script. Vatican Archives.

==== Revolt of Baltu ====
Taghachar's death triggered the revolt of Baltu of the Jalayir, in Anatolia, where he was stationed since Abaqa's reign. He was supported by Ildar (son of Qonqurtai), who was arrested and executed in September 1296. Two months later, Qutluqshah invaded Anatolia with 30,000 men and crushed Baltu's revolt, arresting him in June. He was brought to Tabriz and jailed there until 14 September 1297, when he was executed along with his son. Seljuk Sultan of Rum Mesud II on the other hand was arrested and jailed in Hamadan.

==== Fall of Nawrūz ====
Nawrūz soon embroiled himself in an argument with Nurin Aqa, who was more popular with the military and then left Khorasan. After returning to the west, he survived an assassination attempt by a soldier named Tuqtay, who claimed that Nawrūz murdered his father, Arghun Aqa. Soon he was accused of treason by Sadr al-Din Khaladi, sahib-divan of Ghazan by a secret alliance with the Mamlukes. Indeed, according to Mamluk sources, Nawrūz corresponded with Sultan Lajin. Using the opportunity, Ghazan started a purge against Nawrūz and his followers in May 1297. His brother Hajji Narin and his follower Satalmish were executed, along with Nawrūz's children in Hamadan, his other brother Lagzi Güregen was also put to death in Iraq on 2 April 1297. His 12-year-old son Toghai was spared due to efforts of Bulughan Khatun Khurasani, Ghazan's wife Arghun Aqa's granddaughter and given to the household of Amir Husayn. Others who were spared, were his brother Yol Qutluq and his nephew Kuchluk. Later that year Ghazan marched against Nawrūz himself, who at the time was the commander of the army of Khorasan. Ghazan's forces were victorious at a battle near Nishapur. Nawrūz took refuge at the court of the king of Herat in northern Afghanistan, but the Malik betrayed him and delivered Nawrūz to Kutlushah, who had Nawrūz executed immediately on August 13.

=== Relationship with other Mongol khanates ===
Ghazan maintained strong ties with the Great Khan of the Yuan and the Golden Horde. In 1296 Temür Khan, the successor of Kublai Khan, dispatched a military commander, Baiju, to Mongol Persia. Five years later Ghazan sent his Mongolian and Persian retainers to collect income from Hulegu's holdings in China. While there, they presented tribute to Temür and were involved in cultural exchanges across Mongol Eurasia. Ghazan also called upon other Mongol Khans to unite their will under Temür Khan, in which he was supported by Kaidu's enemy, Bayan Khan of the White Horde. Ghazan's court had Chinese physicians present.

== Later reign ==
In order to stabilize the country Ghazan attempted to control the situation and continued the executions – Taiju (son of Möngke Temür) on 15 April 1298 on charges of sedition, vizier Sadr ul-Din Zanjani on 4 May and his brother Qutb ul-Din and with cousin Qawam ul-Mulk on 3 June on charges of embezzlement, Abu Bakr Dadqabadi on 10 October. Ghazan appointed a Jewish convert to Islam – Rashid-al-Din Hamadani as new vizier succeeding Sadr ul-Din Zanjani, a post which Rashid held for the next 20 years, until 1318. Ghazan also commissioned Rashid-al-Din to produce a history of the Mongols and their dynasty, the Jami' al-Tawarikh "Compendium of Chronicles" or Universal History. Over several years of expansion, the work grew to cover the entire history of the world since the time of Adam, and was completed during the reign of Ghazan's successor, Öljaitü. Many copies were made, a few of which survive to the modern day.

After Taiju's execution, he appointed Nurin Aqa as viceroy of Arran on 11 September 1298.

=== Revolt of Sulemish ===
Sulemish, who Qutlughshah appointed as viceroy in Anatolia after Baltu's revolt, rebelled himself in 1299. He assembled a 20,000 strong force, which postponed Ghazan's plan to invade Mamluk-controlled Syria. Qutlughshah was forced to come back from Arran and won a victory against him, on 27 April 1299 near Erzincan, causing the rebels to flee to Mamluk Egypt. He returned with Mamluk reinforcements to Anatolia but was defeated again. He was brought to Tabriz and executed by burning on 27 September 1299.

=== Mamluk-Ilkhanid War ===
Mongol operations in the Levant, 1299–1300

Ghazan was one of a long line of Mongol leaders who engaged in diplomatic communications with the Europeans and Crusaders in attempts to form a Franco-Mongol alliance against their common enemy, primarily the Egyptian Mamluk Sultanate. He already had the use of forces from Christian vassal countries such as Cilician Armenia and Georgia. The plan was to coordinate actions between Ghazan's forces, the Christian military orders, and the aristocracy of Cyprus to defeat the Egyptian Mamluks, after which Jerusalem would be returned to the European Crusaders. Many Europeans are known to have worked for Ghazan, such as Isol the Pisan or Buscarello de Ghizolfi, often in high positions. Hundreds of such Western adventurers entered into the service of Mongol rulers. According to historian Peter Jackson, the 14th century saw such a vogue of Mongol things in the West that many new-born children in Italy were named after Mongol rulers, including Ghazan: names such as Can Grande ("Great Khan"), Alaone (Hulegu, Ghazan's great-grandfather), Argone (Arghun, Ghazan's father) or Cassano (Ghazan) were recorded with a high frequency.

In October 1299, Ghazan marched with his forces towards Syria and invited the Christians to join him. His army took the city of Aleppo, and was there joined by his vassal King Hethum II of the Armenian Kingdom of Cilicia, whose forces included some Templars and Hospitallers, and who participated in the rest of the offensive. The Mongols and their allies defeated the Mamluks in the Battle of Wadi al-Khazandar, on December 23 or 24, 1299. One group of Mongols then split off from Ghazan's army and pursued the retreating Mamluk troops as far as Gaza, pushing them back to Egypt. The bulk of Ghazan's forces proceeded to Damascus, which surrendered somewhere between December 30, 1299, and January 6, 1300, though its Citadel resisted. Most of Ghazan's forces then retreated in February, probably because their horses needed fodder. He promised to return in the winter of 1300–1301 to attack Egypt. About 10,000 horsemen under the Mongol general Mulay were left to briefly rule Syria, before they too retreated due to Mamluk raids.

==== Interaction with Mamluk delegation of Muslim scholars ====
Ghazan was indeed feared and despised by the Mamluks, who sent a delegation of leading scholars and imams including Ibn Taymiyya, north from Damascus to al-Nabk, where Ghazan was encamped, in January 1300, in order to persuade Ghazan to stop his attack on Damascus. Ibn Taymiyya also may have met the envoys of Ghazan, including the qadi Diya' al-Din Muhammad, in Damascus in August 1301. On one of these occasions, it is reported that not one of the scholars dared to say anything to Ghazan except Ibn Taymiyyah who said:

"You claim that you are a Muslim and you have with you Mu'adhdhins, Muftis, Imams and Shaykhs but you invaded us and reached our country for what? Although your father and your grandfather, Hulegu were non-believers, they did not attack us and they kept their promise. But you promised and broke your promise."

In that meeting, Ibn Taymiyyah prayed for Ghazan Khan: "O Allah! If You know that Ghazan is fighting to uphold Your Word and to strive in Your way, then help him. And if his aim is only to gain worldly power and wealth, then reward him accordingly."

==== Other operations ====
In July 1300, the Crusaders formed a small fleet of sixteen galleys with some smaller vessels to raid the coast, and Ghazan's ambassador traveled with them. The Crusader forces also attempted to establish a base at the small island of Ruad, from which raids were launched on Tartus while awaiting Ghazan's forces. However, the Mongol army was delayed, and the Crusader forces retreated to Cyprus, leaving a garrison on Ruad which was besieged and captured by Mamluks by 1303 (see Siege of Ruad).

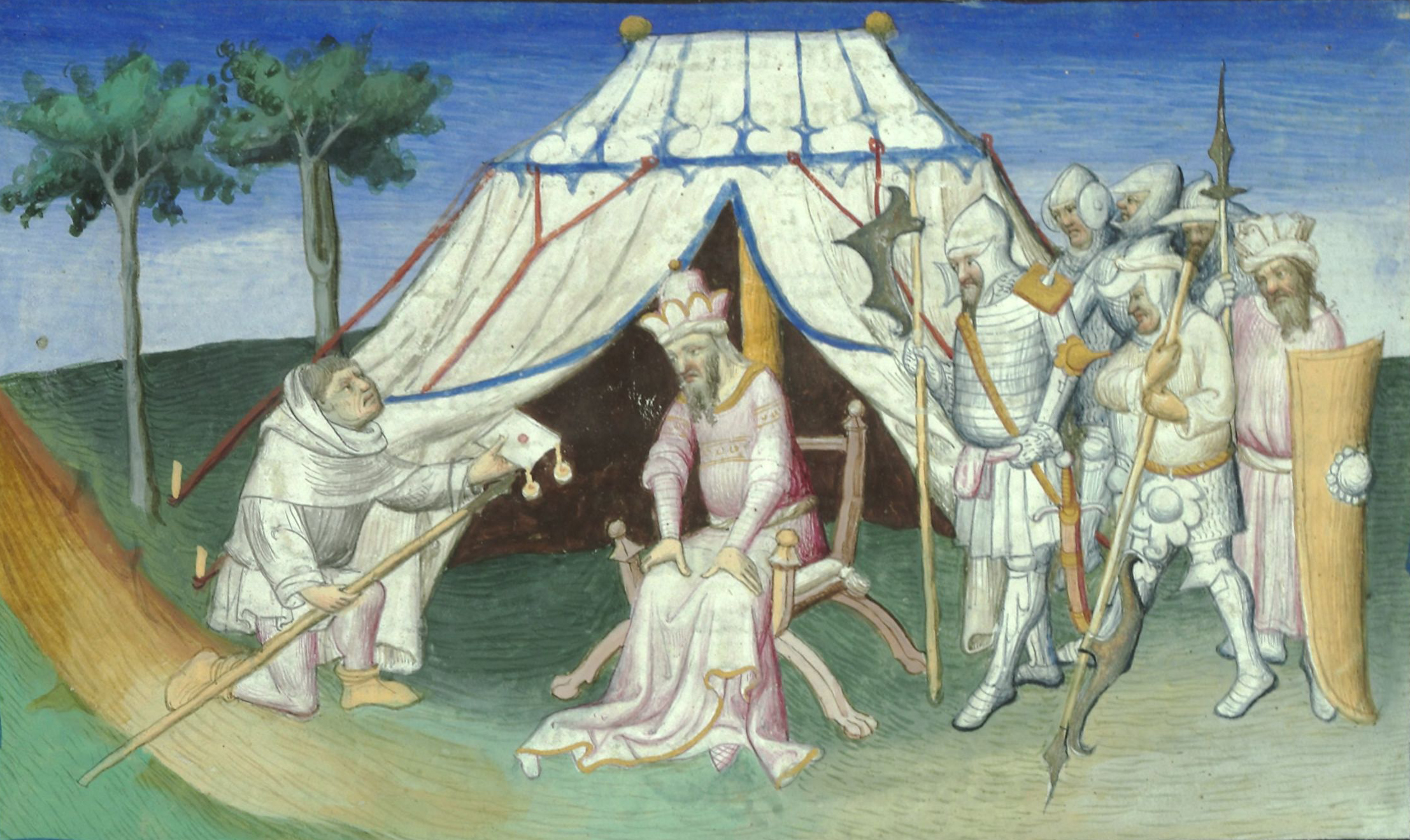
Ghazan ordering the King of Armenia Hethum II to accompany Kutlushah on the 1303 attack on Damascus.

In February 1301, the Mongols advanced again with a force of 60,000, but could do little else than engage in some raids around Syria. Ghazan's general Kutlushah stationed 20,000 horsemen in the Jordan Valley to protect Damascus, where a Mongol governor was stationed. But again, they were soon forced to withdraw.

Plans for combined operations with the Crusaders were again made for the following winter offensive, and in late 1301, Ghazan asked Pope Boniface VIII to send troops, priests, and peasants, in order to make the Holy Land a Frank state again. But again, Ghazan did not appear with his own troops. He wrote again to the Pope in 1302, and his ambassadors also visited the court of Charles II of Anjou, who on April 27, 1303, sent Gualterius de Lavendel as his own ambassador back to Ghazan's court.

In 1303, Ghazan sent another letter to Edward I via Buscarello de Ghizolfi, reiterating his great-grandfather Hulegu Khan's promise that the Mongols would give Jerusalem to the Franks in exchange for help against the Mamluks. The Mongols, along with their Armenian vassals, had mustered a force of about 80,000 to repel the raiders of the Chagatai Khanate, which was under the leadership of Qutlugh Khwaja. After their success there, they advanced again towards Syria. However, Ghazan's forces were utterly defeated by the Mamluks just south of Damascus at the decisive Battle of Marj al-Saffar in April 1303. It was to be the last major Mongol invasion of Syria.

== End of reign ==
After military campaigns, Ghazan returned to his capital Ujan in July 1302 and made several appointments: Nirun Aqa and Öljaitü were reconfirmed in Arran and Khorasan as viceroys respectively, while Mulay was sent to Diyarbakir and Qutluqshah was assigned to Georgia. He received a concubine from Andronikos II Palaiologos in 1302, who may be the Despina Khatun that later married to Öljaitü. On 17 September 1303, Ghazan betrothed his daughter Öljei Qutlugh to Bistam, son of his brother Öljaitü.

According to Rashid al-Din, Ghazan became depressed after his wife Karamun's death on 21 January. He once told his amirs that "life was a prison... and is not a benefit". Later in March/April, he nominated his brother Öljaitü as his successor, as he had no son his own. Eventually, he died on 11 May 1304 near Qazvin. He was bathed in the water of Lar Damavand valley of Mazandaran.

Ghazan himself appears to have dabbled in Sufism. According to the testimony of Shaykh Sadr al-Din Ibrahim Hammuiya, recorded in several Mamluk sources, Ghazan was given a woolen coat by him, indicating that perhaps the Ilkhan was initiated as a Sufi. This is not to say that Ghazan's relations with Sufis were trouble-free. In 703/1303, word came to him of a conspiracy of Sufi shaykhs and others to depose and replace him with his cousin, Ala Fireng, son of the Ilkhan Gaykhatu (r. 1291–95).

== Legacy ==
=== Religious policy ===
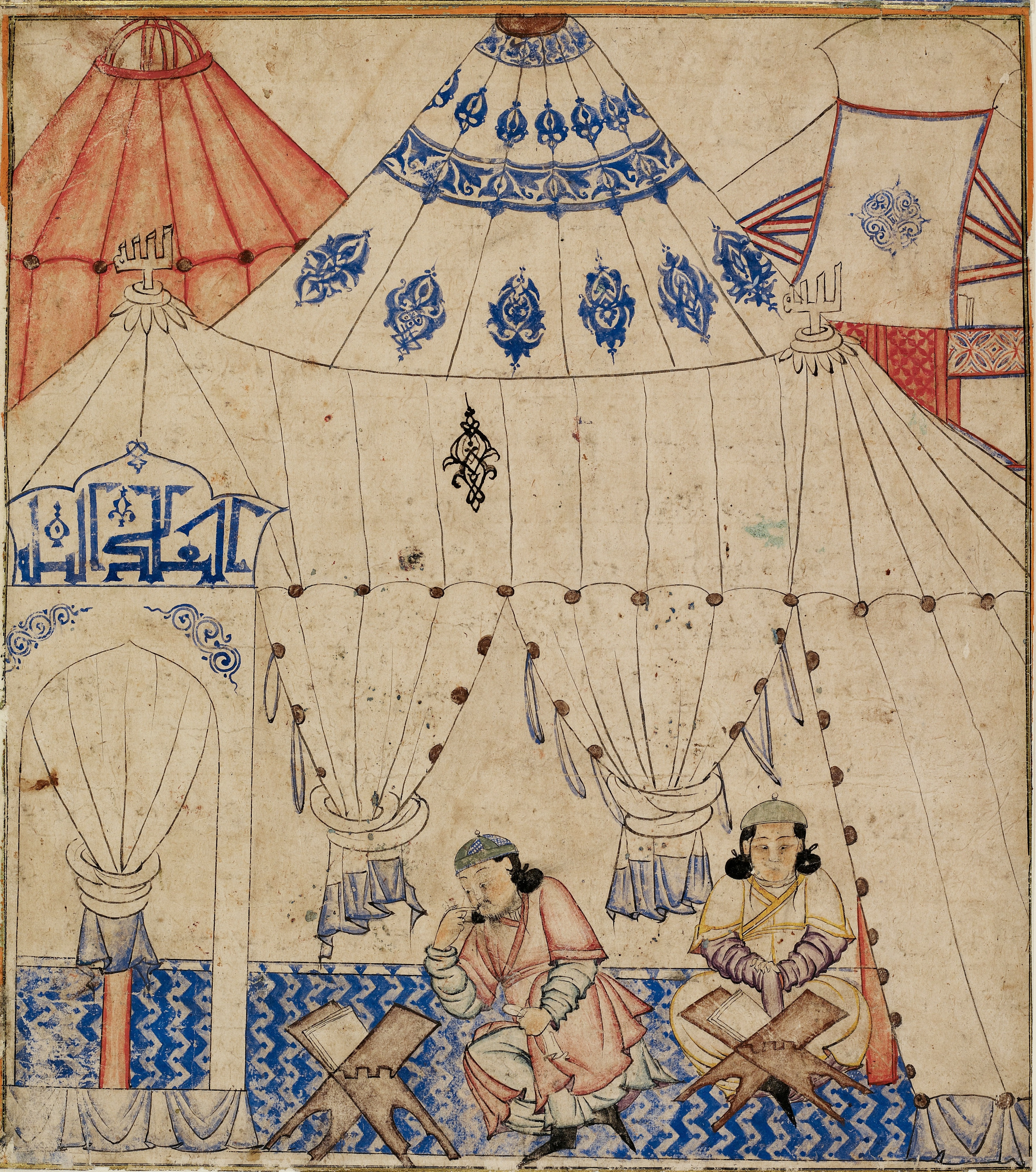
Ghazan studying the Quran.

As part of his conversion to Islam, Ghazan changed his first name to the Islamic Mahmud, and Islam gained popularity within Mongol territories. He showed tolerance for multiple religions, encouraged the original archaic Mongol culture to flourish, tolerated the shias, and respected the religions of his Georgian and Armenian vassals. Ghazan therefore continued his forefather's approach toward religious tolerance. When Ghazan learned that some Buddhist monks feigned conversion to Islam due to their temples being earlier destroyed, he granted permission to all who wished to return to Tibet or Kashmir and other regions in India where they could freely follow their faith and be among other Buddhists. The Mongol Yassa code remained in place and Mongol shamans remained politically influential throughout the reign of both Ghazan and his brother and successor Öljaitü, but ancient Mongol traditions eventually went into decline after Öljaitü's demise. Other religious upheaval in the Ilkhanate during Ghazan's reign was instigated by Nawruz, Ghazan put a stop to these exactions by issuing an edict exempting the Christians from the jizya (tax on non-Muslims), and re-established the Christian Patriarch Mar Yaballaha III in 1296. Ghazan reportedly punished religious fanatics who destroyed churches and synagogues in Tabriz on 21 July 1298.

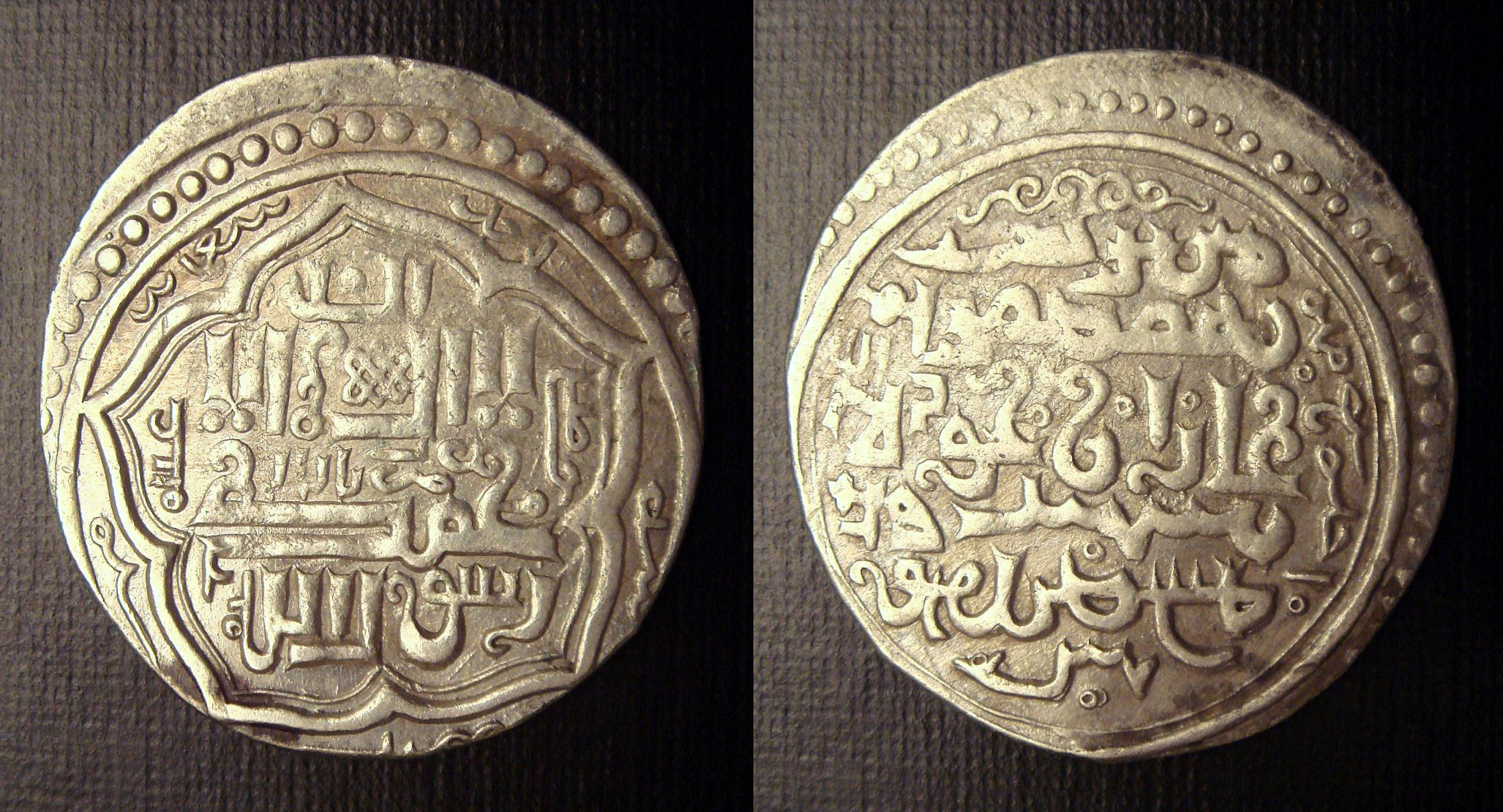
Double silver dirham of Ghazan. Obv: Arabic: لاإله إلا الله محمد رسول الله صلى الله عليه وسلم/ ضرب تبريز/ في سنة سبع ...ر, romanized: Lā ilāha illa llāha Muḥammadun rasūlu llāhi ṣalla llāhu ʽalayhi wa-sallam / ḍuriba Tabrīz / fī sanati sabʽin ..., lit. 'There is no God but Allah, Muhammad is His Prophet, Peace be upon him/ Minted in Tabriz in the year ...7' : "" Rev: Legend in Mongolian script (except for "Ghazan Mahmud" in Arabic): Tengri-yin Küchündür. Ghazan Mahmud. Ghasanu Deledkegülügsen: "By the strength of the Heaven/ Ghazan Mahmud/ Coin struck for Ghazan". Tabriz mint. 4.0 gr (0.26 g). Silver.

=== Reforms ===
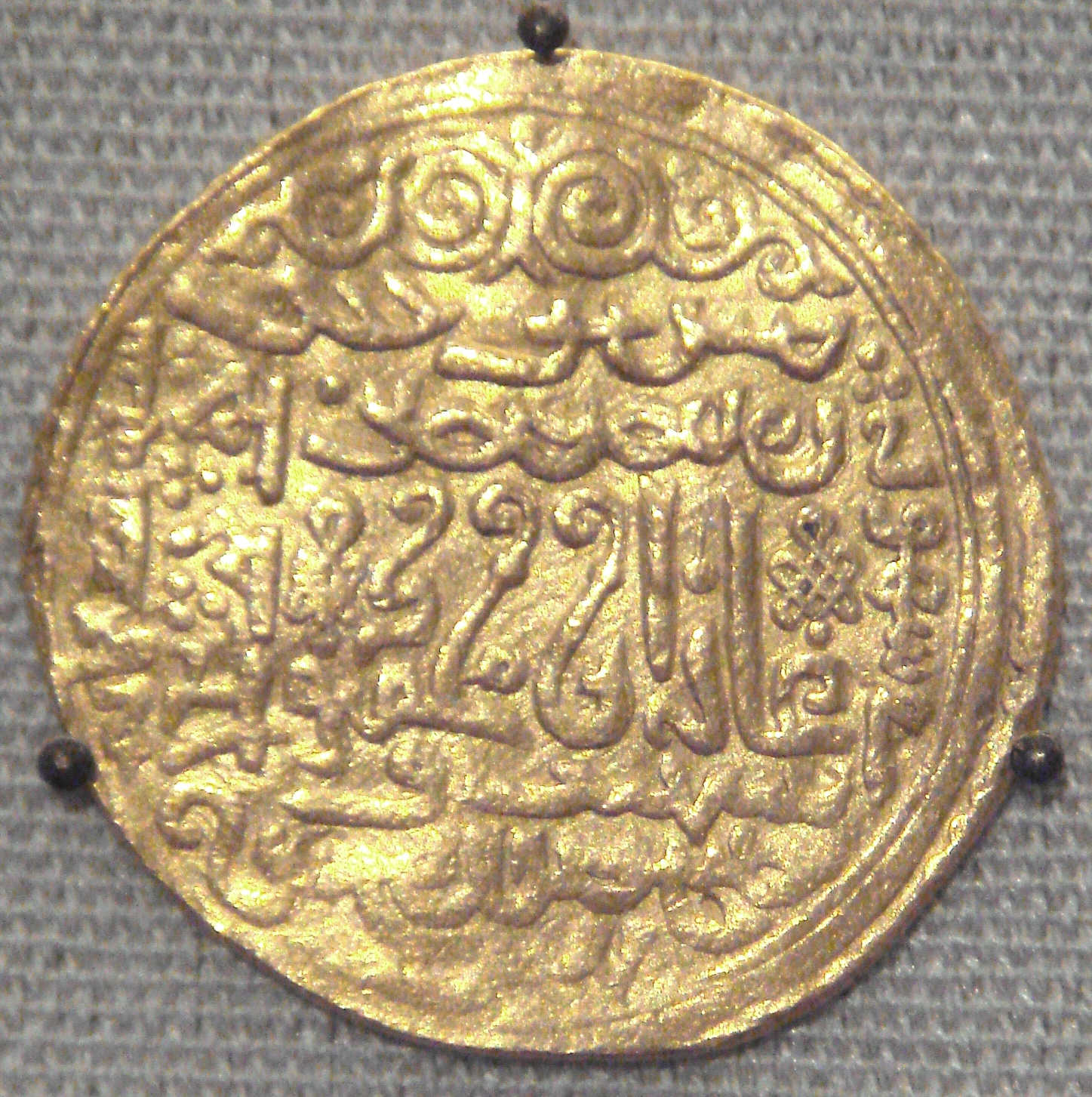
Gold coin under Ghazan, Shiraz, Iran, AH 700, AD 1301.

Ghazan was a man of high culture, with many hobbies including linguistics, agro-techniques, painting, and chemistry. According to the Byzantine historian Pachymeres (1242–1310): "No one surpassed him, in making saddles, bridles, spurs, greaves and helmets; he could hammer, stitch and polish, and in such occupations employed the hours of his leisure from war." Ghazan spoke numerous languages, including Chinese, Arabic, and "Frank" (probably Latin), as well as his own native language Mongolian.

In addition to his religious deep impact on Persia, Ghazan had unified measures, coinage and weights in the Ilkhanate. He ordered a new census in Persia to define the Dynasty's fiscal policy. He began to reuse wilderness, non-producing and abandoned lands to raise crops, strongly supporting the use and introduction of Eastern Asian crops in Persia, and improved the Yam system. He constructed hostels, hospitals, schools, and posts. Envoys from the court received a per diem stipend, and those of the nobility traveled at their own expense. Ghazan ordered only envoys bearing urgent military intelligence to use the staffed postal relay service. Mongol soldiers were given iqtas by the Ilkhanid court, where they were allowed to gather revenue provided by a piece of land. Ghazan also banned lending at interest.

Ghazan reformed the issuance of jarliqs (edicts), creating set forms and graded seals, ordering that all jarliqs be kept on file at court. Jarliqs older than 30 years were to be cancelled, along with old paizas (Mongol seals of authority). He fashioned new paizas into two ranks, which contained the names of the bearers on them to prevent them from being transferred. Old paizas were also to be turned in at the end of the official's term.

In fiscal policy, Ghazan introduced a unified bi-metallic currency including Ghazani dananeer ( plural of dinar ), and reformed purchasing procedures, replacing the traditional Mongol policy on craftsmen in the Ilkhanate, such as organizing purchases of raw materials and payment to artisans. He also opted to purchase most weapons on the open market.

On coins, Ghazan omitted the name of the Great Khan, instead inscribing his own name upon his coins in Iran and Anatolia. But he continued to diplomatic and economic relations with the Great Khan at Dadu. In Georgia, he minted coins with the traditional Mongolian formula "Struck by the Ilkhan Ghazan in the name of Khagan" because he wanted to secure his claim on the Caucasus with the help of the Great Khans of the Yuan dynasty. He also continued to use the Great Khan's Chinese seal which declared him to be a wang (prince) below the Great Khan.

His reforms also extended to the military, as several new guard units, mostly Mongols, were created by Ghazan for his army center. However, he restricted new guards' political significance. Seeing Mongol commoners selling their children into slavery as damaging to both the manpower and the prestige of the Mongol army, Ghazan budgeted funds to redeem Mongol slave boys, and made his minister Bolad (the ambassador of the Great Khan Kublai) commander of a military unit of redeemed Mongol slaves.

== Family ==
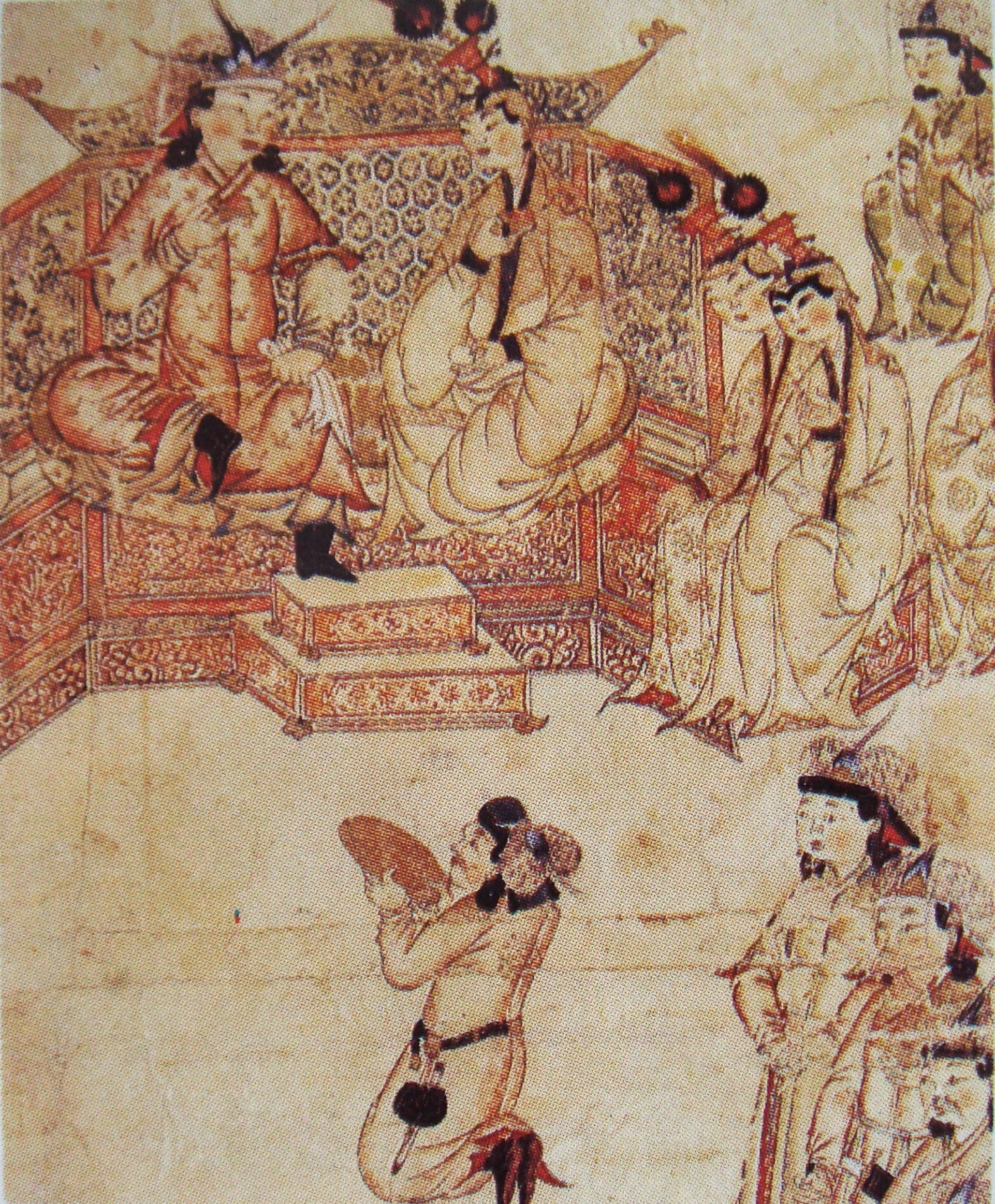
Ghazan and his wives at court

Ghazan had nine wives, 6 of them being principal wives and one being concubine:

- Yedi Kurtka Khatun – daughter of Möngke Temür Güregen (from Suldus tribe) and Tuglughshah Khatun (daughter of Qara Hülegü)
- Bulughan Khatun Khurasani – daughter of Amir Tasu (from Eljigin clan of Khongirad) and Menglitegin, daughter of Arghun Aqa
  1. A stillborn son (born 1291 in Damavand)
- Kököchin Khatun (b. 1269, m. 1293 at Abhar, d. 1296) – relative of Buluqhan Khatun
- Bulughan Khatun Muazzama (m. 17 October 1295 at Tabriz, d. 5 January 1310) – daughter of Otman Noyan (from Khongirad tribe), widow of Gaykhatu and Arghun
  1. Uljay Qutlugh Khatun – married firstly to Bistam, son of Öljaitü, married secondly to his brother Abu Sa'id
  2. Alju (b. 22 February 1298 in Arran – 20 August 1300 in Tabriz)
- Eshil Khatun (betrothed in 1293, married on 2 July 1296 at Tabriz, d. 5 August 1309, bur. Shanb Ghazan) – daughter of Tugh Timur Amir-Tüman (son of Noqai Yarghuchi of Bayauts)
- Dondi Khatun (d. 9 February 1298) – daughter of Aq Buqa (from Jalayir tribe), widow of Gaykhatu
- Karamün Khatun (m. 17 July 1299, d. 21 January 1304) – daughter of Qutlugh Temür (cousin of Bulughan Khatun Muazzama, from Khongirad tribe)
- Günjishkab Khatun – daughter of Shadai Güregen (great-grandson of Chilaun) and Orghudaq Khatun (daughter of Jumghur)
- Eirene Palaiologina, daughter of Andronikos II (married in 1302)

== In popular culture ==
- In 1985 Egyptian drama series Ibn Taymiya by Qatar TV, Ghazan was portrayed by Egyptian actor Ahmed Maher, where Ghazan is portrayed in the historical sequence of encounter debate with Ibn Taimiya.
- In the animated series The Legend of Korra, there is a fictional character named Ghazan which loosely assimilates with Ghazan Khan.
- In the series Kuruluş: Osman's season 4, Ghazan's name has been mentioned many times, his orders or letters have been mentioned, and envoys have been sent on his behalf: his adopted daughter Esrigun Hatun, a fictional character and various generals or envoys (such as Naimans (Komutan or commander Nayman or other Mongol commanders) have been seen to work for Ghazan. It shows that Ghazan Khan has converted to Islam and is helping Osman Ghazi suppress internal enemies or rebels of the Mongols. At first, commander Nayman was sent by Ghazan to kill Osman, later Ghazan converts to Islam, but Nayman hates it and Ghazan again sent his daughter Esrigun to help Osman.

== Sources ==
- Adh-Dhababi, Record of the Destruction of Damascus by the Mongols in 1299–1301 Translated by Joseph Somogyi. From: Ignace Goldziher Memorial Volume, Part 1, Online (English translation).
- Amitai, Reuven (1987). "Mongol Raids into Palestine (AD 1260 and 1300)". Journal of the Royal Asiatic Society: 236–255.
- Barber, Malcolm (2001). The Trial of the Templars (2nd ed.). University Press, Cambridge. ISBN 978-0-521-67236-8.
- Encyclopædia Iranica, Article on Franco-Persian relations
- Fisher, William Bayne (1998), The Cambridge History of Iran, vol. 5
- Foltz, Richard, Religions of the Silk Road, Palgrave Macmillan, 2nd edition, 2010 ISBN 978-0-230-62125-1
- Demurger, Alain (2007). Jacques de Molay (in French). Editions Payot&Rivages. ISBN 978-2-228-90235-9.
- Jackson, Peter (2005). The Mongols and the West: 1221–1410. Longman. ISBN 978-0-582-36896-5.
- Hamadani, Rashidaddin (1998), Compendium of Chronicles, translated by Thackston, W.M, Harvard University, Dept. of Near Eastern Languages and Civilizations, OCLC 41120851
- Hope, Michael (2016), Power, politics, and tradition in the Mongol Empire and the Ilkhanate of Iran, Oxford University Press, ISBN 978-0-19-108107-1, OCLC 959277759
- Michaud, Yahia (Oxford Centre for Islamic Studies) (2002). Ibn Taymiyya, Textes Spirituels I-XVI (PDF) (in French). "Le Musulman", Oxford-Le Chebec.
- Nicolle, David (2001). The Crusades. Essential Histories. Osprey Publishing. ISBN 978-1-84176-179-4.
- Richard, Jean (1996). Histoire des Croisades. Fayard. ISBN 2-213-59787-1.
- Runciman, Steven (1987) [first published in 1952–1954]. A history of the Crusades 3. Penguin Books. ISBN 978-0-14-013705-7.
- Schein, Sylvia (October 1979). "Gesta Dei per Mongolos 1300. The Genesis of a Non-Event". The English Historical Review. 94 (373): 805–819. doi:10.1093/ehr/XCIV.CCCLXXIII.805. JSTOR 565554.
- Roux, Jean-Paul (1993). Histoire de l'Empire Mongol (in French). Fayard. ISBN 2-213-03164-9.

Regnal titles
Preceded by Baydu	Ilkhan; 1295–1304	Succeeded by Öljaitü
