= Hokmavar =

Hokmavar (Azerbaijani: Hökmavar or Hökmabad, Persian: حکم آباد, also Hokmabad) is an old and historic district, located in northwest of Tabriz, Azerbaijan of Iran. Hokmavar is restricted to Sham Qazan and Akhini neighbourhoods in south, Jamshidabad neighbourhood in north, Vijaviya and Bahar neighbourhoods in east and Qaramalek neighbourhoods in west.

Hokmavar has been mentioned in historic Persian travel literature. Hokmavar was originally a village near Tabriz, however with the expansion of the city within last decade it has become a neighbourhood of Tabriz. Old Hokmavar village had two gates and four squares which were destroyed mostly within the last decades of gentrification. There are still several historic mosques remaining in Hokmavar. Hokmavar historical bath has been saved. During the Iranian constitutional revolution, Hokmavar was an important resistance center against Mohammad Ali Shah's forces. Ahmad Kasravi, who was born and grown up in Hokmavar, has documented his memories of the constitutional revolution in one of his book History of the Iranian Constitutional Revolution. During Iran-Iraq war 200 participants from Hokmavar in the war have been killed and also Hokmavar was bombarded in 1986.

Hokmavar is the main olericulture center of Tabriz, due to its large vegetable farms, which partially have survived the city expansion. At least since Pahlavi period, Tabriz municipality has had a plan to change the farms into a large park, Tabriz Grand Park, however, the plan was postponed several times. Within last decade, Tabriz municipality has captured some of Hokmavar's farms, claiming that they will be changed into a park. However, part of those captured lands have been changed into settlement land use and new neighbourhood of Nezampezeski has been established. Similarly, majority of Tabriz's historic gardens in its old neighbourhoods have been changed into settlements. Recently, a few of the farms of Hokmavar has been changed into a park and a road has been built in the middle of the farms. On 8 August 2015, a group of Hokmavar farmers had a protest against Tabriz municipality plans.

A poetry book on Hokmavar, called Hokmavar Nameh, has been written by a native of Hokmavar.

== Etymology ==
There are several opinions on the etymology of Hokmavar. Some consider it as composed of two Azerbaijani words: "Hami (all)" and "Kavar (vegetable, olericulture), and the name of district can also be related to Avar. Dehkhoda dictionary translates the Persian word حکم آباد (Hokmabad) into vegetable farm. It is also mentioned to be originated from middle Persian, meaning beautiful garden cottage. According to Ahmad Kasravi in his controversial book on the etymology of the names of the Iranian cities and villages "avar" means place. and therefore Hokmavar means place of ruling. It has also been mentioned that Hokmavar comes from Azerbaijani words meaning "walls made out of brick and stone in a special form" and then has been persianized.

== Notable Characters ==
- Ahmad Kasravi
