= Shanb Ghazan =

Neighbourhood in Tabriz, Iran

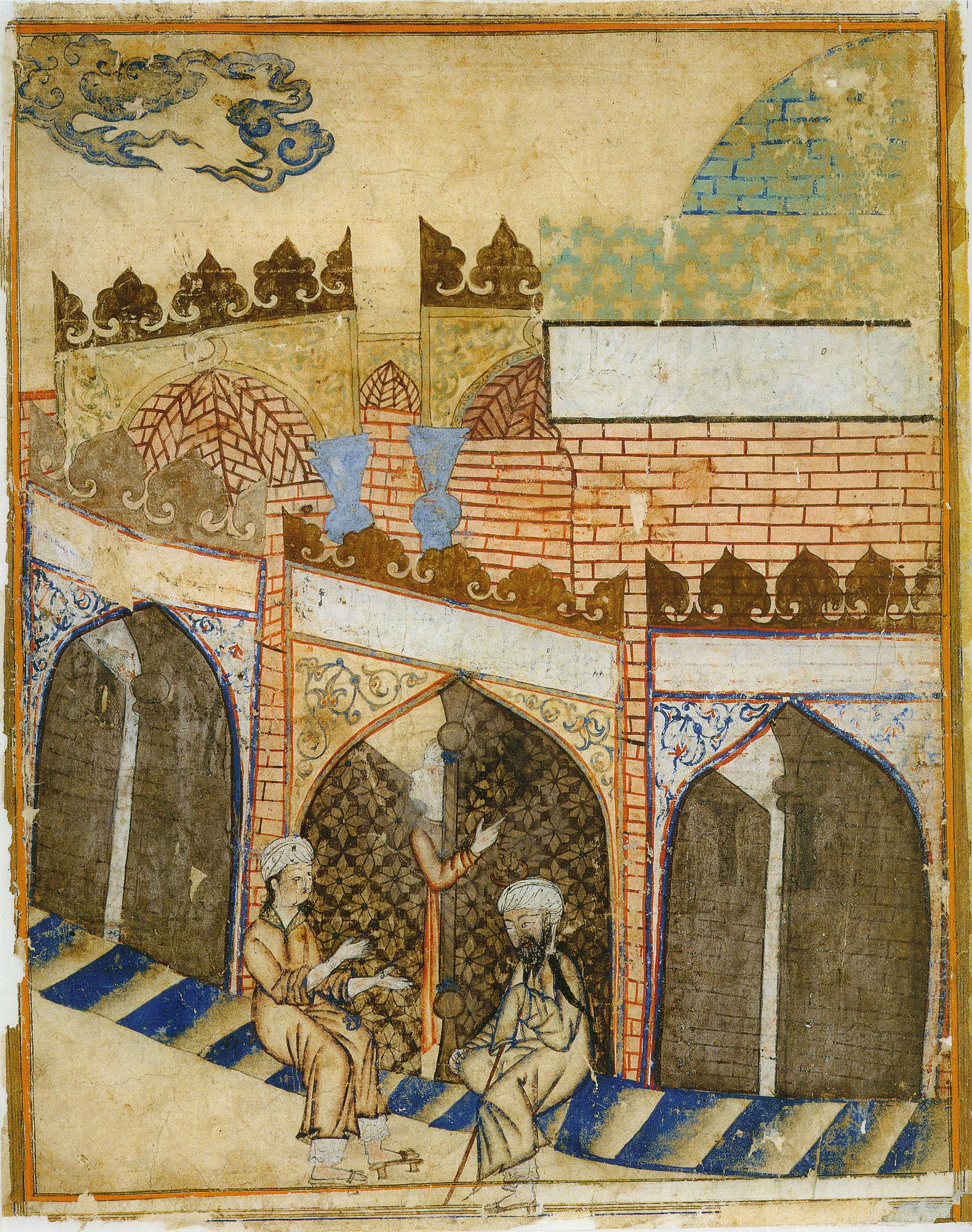
A Miniature of Ghazan Khan Mausoleum

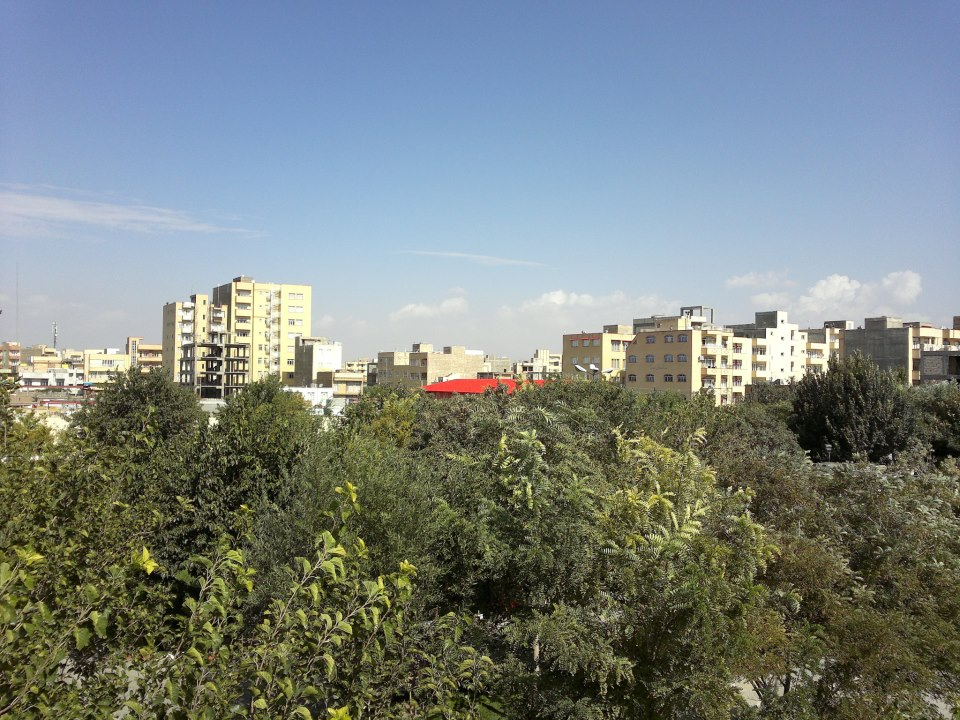
A picture of the modern days Shanb Ghazan

Shanb-e-Ghazan, Ghazaniyya, or Sham-e-Ghazan (Persian: شنب غازان, local pronunciation: Sham-Ghazan) is one of the historical neighborhoods of Tabriz, Iran. Shanb-e-Ghazan's historical importance is mostly due to construction of the Ghazan Mausoleum, a complex made by the Ilkhanid emperor in late 13 and early 14th century.

== History ==
At the time of the Ilkhanate and Arghun Khan's kingdom in 1290, Shanb-e-Ghazan grew from a village named Shanb or Sham into a large and populous town named Arghuniyye. The main parts of this construction included a Buddhist temple (Arghun was a Buddhist) and a palace named Adiliyya.

At the time of king Mahmud Ghazan, Ghazan Khan, Shanb-e-Ghazan evolved into a large satellite city of Tabriz called Ghazaniya. The neighborhood reached its greatest prosperity at this time.

In late 1297, Ghazan Khan built his unique Tomb called Qubba-ye-Aali (Big Dome) in the central part of the town. As he was very interested in benevolence, he ordered the construction of twelve public institutions in all twelve sides of this building which consisted of: a jami mosque, a khanqah, a Hanafi school, a Shafi'i school, Dar Al Siyadah, an observatory, a hospital, a library, Beit Al Qanun, Beit-al-Motavalli (house of trustees), pool house, and bathroom. There were other buildings such as an orphanage and Hakimiyya around this building.

Ghazan Khan's Dome with its 135 meters height astonished visitors; Shanb-e-Ghazan's other buildings became a scientific - cultural centre of its era. According to Ghazan Khan's order, foreign merchants should pass through and stay in Shanb-e-Ghazan in order to enter Tabriz. The tax receipts of Ojan province and some villages, and one-tenth of objects entered into the treasury were allocated to Ghazaniyya. These factors all together made it a town that was unique throughout Iran (Mostofi- Nuhzat al Qoloub).

In later centuries, beside scientific cultural activities in this town, because of its strategic importance the land of this area was used as a battlefield of different countries.

At the time of Safavid it became more importance and Pargalı Ibrahim Pasha, Suleiman the Magnificent's minister, after occupying Tabriz built a castle in Shanb-e-Ghazan which was used later by Safavid and Ottoman Empire. Ottomans called Shanb-e-Ghazan "Dar Al Aman" (Safe Place); however Shah Abbas I of Safavid in order to prevent Ottomans' inhabitancy ordered the destruction of all Ghazani buildings except for the Tomb, Mosque, Khanqah, and probably one of the schools.

The earthquakes of 1641, 1650, and 1721 wrought much destruction upon Shanb-e-Ghazan and its buildings, and reduced its residential area. The earthquake of the first morning of 1780 buried the remaining buildings. Only the south eastern parts of Ghazaniyyah remain.

Shanb-e-Ghazan's antiquities because of the inadvertence of Qajar and Pahlavi government has been despoiled and it has led to this point that nowadays in this historical neighborhood there are no historical remains except for a bathroom and some scattered tiles.
