= Nakipari church =

Medieval church in the Mestia Municipality, Georgia

Nakipari church of Saint George
- ნაკიფარის წმინდა გიორგის სახელობის ეკლესია
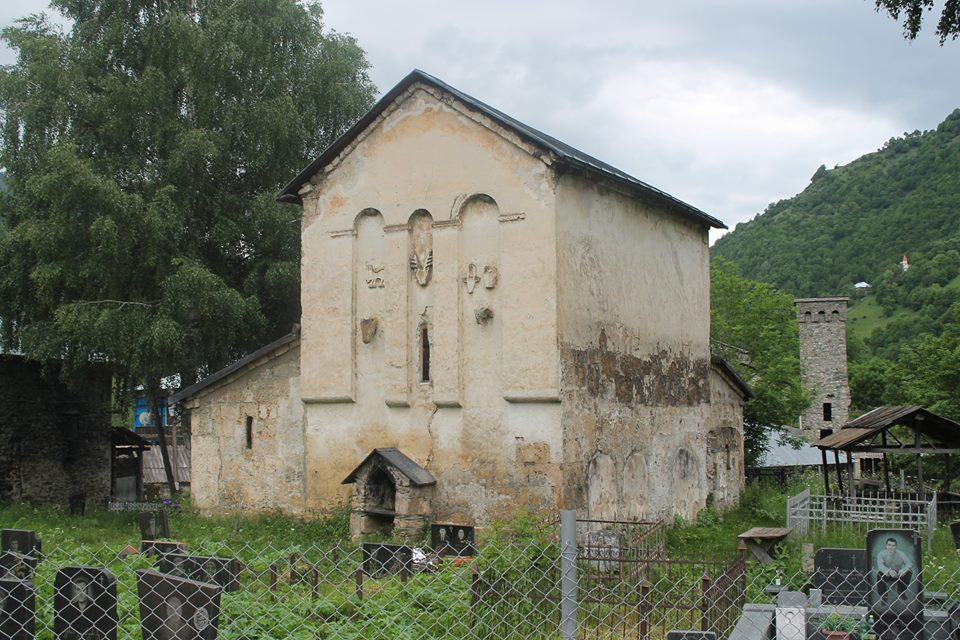
- Nakipari church of Saint George. East façade.
- Interactive map of Nakipari church of Saint George
- Location: Nakipari, Mestia Municipality, Samegrelo-Zemo Svaneti, Georgia
- Coordinates: 43.010545°N 42.818912°E
- Type: Hall church

The Nakipari church of Saint George (Georgian: ნაკიფარის წმინდა გიორგის სახელობის ეკლესია, romanized: nak'iparis ts'minda giorgis sakhelobis ek'lesia), locally known as Jgrag (ჯგრაგ), is a medieval church in the Mestia Municipality in Georgia's region of Samegrelo-Zemo Svaneti. The area is part of the highland historical and cultural region of Upper Svaneti. The designation Jgrag derives from the name of Saint George in the local Svan language. It is a hall church, adorned with frescoes painted by Tevdore in 1130. The church is inscribed on the list of the Immovable Cultural Monuments of National Significance of Georgia.

St. George is perched on a hill, surrounded by a village cemetery, at the hamlet of Nakipari, part of the Ipari territorial unit, Mestia Municipality, at about 1700 metres above sea level. The church and cemetery are enveloped by a now half-ruined stone wall. The exact date when Jgrag was built is unknown; it is stylistically dated to the 10th or 11th century.

== Layout ==
The Nakipari church is built of limestone blocks. It is a hall church, set in a rectangular plan, with an inscribed semicircular apse on the east. The church is based on a single-step socle. Its walls terminate with simple profiled cornices made of small hewn stone slabs. The nave is covered with a high gable roof; a stoa attached to the south and west façades is pent-roofed. The church is elongated along the east-west axis. It has two doors, on the west and south. The east façade is a characteristic feature of the church. It is adorned with a decorative tripartite arcade framed by massive projecting pilasters and bears frescoes and zoomorphic sculptures in relief. The frescoed outer walls at Nakipari are among the earliest in Svaneti and façade sculptures are unusual for the region's architecture.

=== Frescoes ===
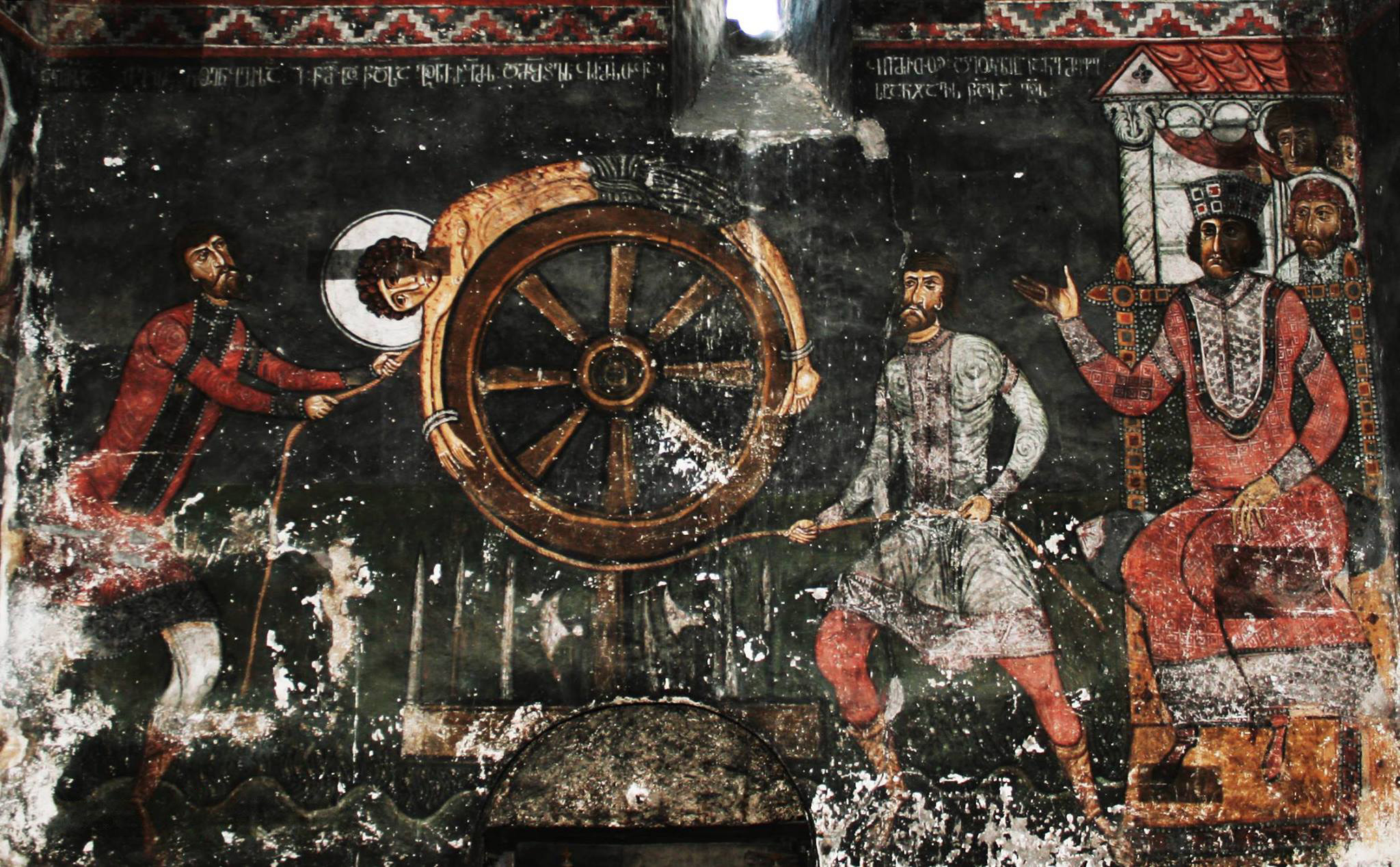
Martyrdom of St. George. A fresco from Nakipari.

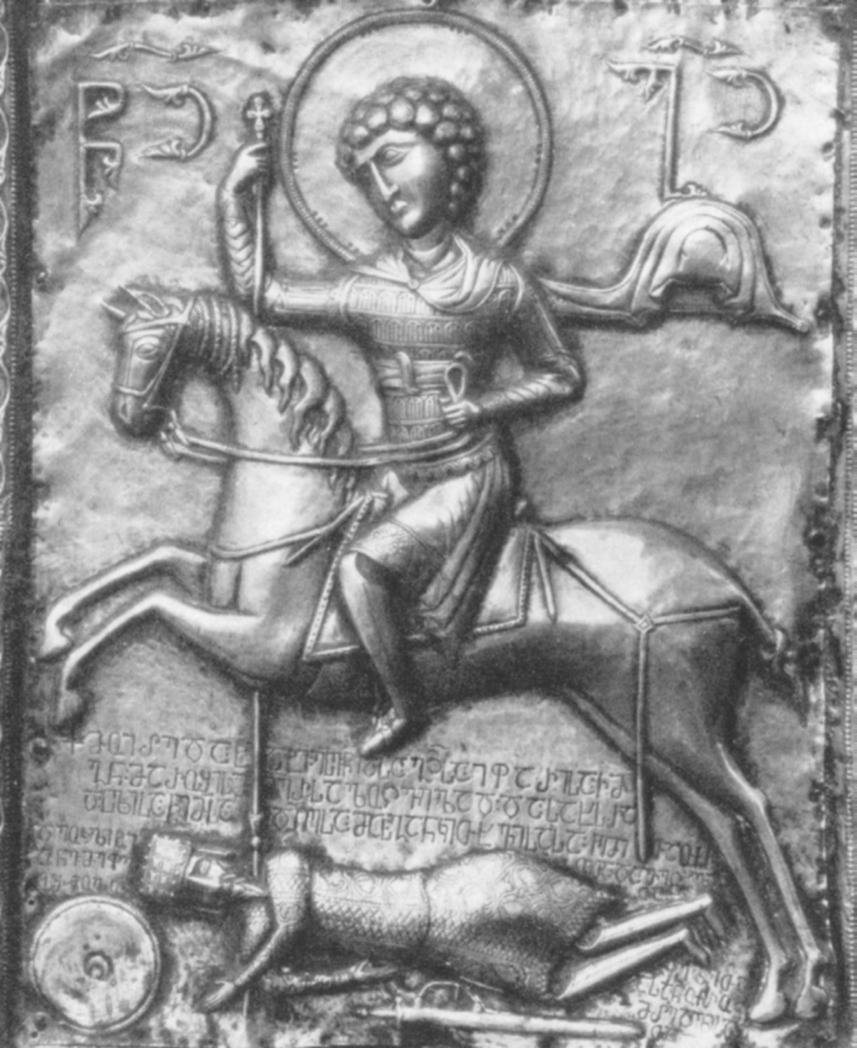
St. George of Ipari, a repoussé icon.

The interior is extensively frescoed, with accompanying explanatory inscriptions. According to a Georgian asomtavruli inscription on a cornice of the iconostasis, the paintings were commissioned by the local nobility (aznauri) from Tevdore, "a royal painter", in 1130. Nakipari is the last church unquestionably painted, after Iprari and Lagurka, by Tevdore; murals at Tsvirmi are conditionally credited to him based on stylistic considerations.

The iconographic program at Nakipari is dominated by depictions of the church's titular saint, George. The sanctuary apse contains a set of frescoes in two registers. The conch traditionally bears the Deesis with the seated Christ flanked by Mary and John the Baptist, with the angels in the background. The lower register contains the Apostles and Church Fathers, five figures in total. On the west wall there is George miraculously causing idols to fall down in the upper register and the saint being tortured on a wheel in the lower register.

The upper register on the north wall is adorned with the Harrowing of Hell and Baptism, while the lower register contains two mounted warrior saints facing each other—George transfixing a prostrate Diocletian and Theodore spearing a serpent. On the south wall, the upper two scenes depict the Pentecost and Crucifixion and the lower register is occupied by three scenes of George's martyrdom.

The church preserves an 11th-century repoussé silver icon of St. George of Ipari, showing the equestrian saint killing Diocletian. According to an accompanying inscription it was commissioned by the certain Marushan from a goldsmith named Asan.
