= Iprari church =

Church in Mestia, Georgia

- იფრარის ეკლესია
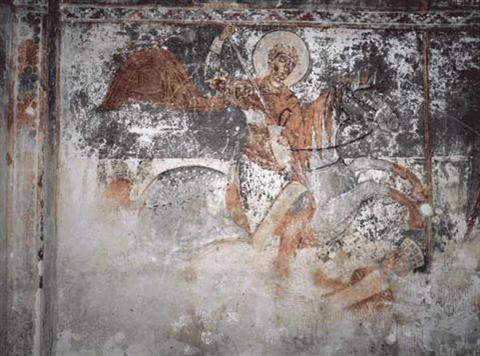
- Fresco of St. George from Iprari.
- Interactive map of Iprari church
- Location: Iprari, Mestia Municipality, Samegrelo-Zemo Svaneti, Georgia
- Coordinates: 42.936667°N 42.924444°E
- Type: Hall church

The Iprari church of the Archangels (Georgian: იფრარის მთავარანგელოზის ეკლესია, romanized: ipraris mtavarangelozis ek'lesia), or Tarngzel as it is locally known is an 11th-century Georgian Orthodox church on the outskirts of Mestia in Upper Svaneti. Architecturally an unremarkable hall church, Iprari contains a set of frescoes painted by Tevdore in 1096, one of the high points of medieval Georgian monumental art. The church is inscribed on the list of the Immovable Cultural Monuments of National Significance of Georgia.

== Architecture ==
Iprari is a small and simple rectangular edifice with the dimensions of 4.75 × 2.6 m^{2}, ending in an apse to the east. The church is built of well-hewn yellowish pumice square blocks. Facades are simple, decoration-poor. The only entrance is located on the west. The interior is lit by two windows, one in the apse and the other above the entrance. The altar is separated from the hall by a stone altar screen, with three arched openings. The walls of the church are plain, without much architectural treatment; brackets are used to support arches on the longitudinal walls. The interior walls contain a number of scratched memorial graffiti, dating from the 11th to the 15th century.

== Frescoes ==
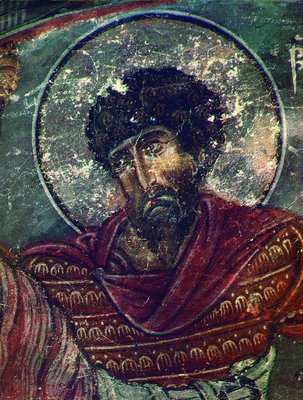
Theodore Stratelates. A fresco from Iprari.

Architecturally unremarkable, the interior of the Iprari church preserves high-quality murals commissioned by the local community from the "royal painter" Tevdore in 1096, as reported by a Georgian inscription on the altar screen. This Tevdore is also known to have frescoed two other churches in Svaneti: the Lagurka church of Saints Cyricus and Julitta in 1112 and the Nakipari church of St. George in 1130.

The frescoes are organized so as to follow the architectural features of the interior; various ornamental motifs are used to frame and demarcate the mural compositions. Scenes in the conch of the apse depict, in the upper and lower tiers, respectively, the Deesis and a group of church hierarchs flanked by two burning candelabra. The altar screen contains depictions of Sts. Cyricus and Julitta, Demetrius of Thessaloniki, and Stephen. The frescoes on the walls and ceiling are also arranged in two tiers, depicting the baptism of Jesus, the equestrian Saint George, the archangel Michael and Joshua, kneeling down before him, on the northern wall and the nativity of Jesus, the archangel Gabriel, the equestrian Theodore Stratelates, the Madonna Nicopeia, and Saint Anne on the southern wall.

The western wall contains the frescoes of the Annunciation and Sts. Barbara and Catherine. (Note: Saints Catherine and Barbara and, to a lesser extent, Marina and Irina were particularly venerated in Svaneti as were male warrior saints such as George and Theodore as evidenced by their frequent depictions in the wall paintings in this part of Georgia.) The exterior of the southern facade, facing the village, was also completely frescoed—a feature characteristic for the medieval Svanetian churches—by an unknown local painter of the 12th century. These murals—depicting the Deesis and Saint Eustace's hunting scene—have largely faded.

== Icons ==
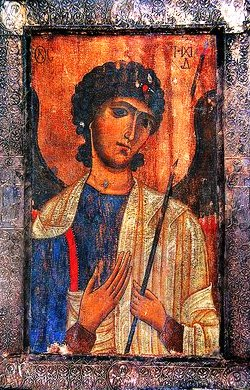
Archangel Michael. A 12th-13th century icon from the Iprari iconostasis.

Like many other medieval churches in Svaneti, the Iprari church—owing to its remoteness—served as a safe repository of pieces of Christian art. Touring the region in 1910, the Georgian scholar Ekvtime Taqaishvili reported at least a dozen of old church items, including a now-lost 13th-century triptych of the Virgin and Child, which also depicted the ktitor David, apparently King David VII of Georgia, as suggested by mentioning David and his wife Gvantsa in another inscription on the icon. (Note: The Iprari triptych survives in a photograph by Dmitri Yermakov who accompanied Taqaishvili on his expedition to Svaneti.) Preserved in the iconostasis of Iprari is the 12th–13th century icon depicting the archangel Michael and the Deesis.
