= Jikur =

Jikur (Georgian: ჯიქური) (died c. 1252–1259) was a courtier of King David VII of Georgia, who exerted a considerable influence on the internal politics of Georgia until being executed on charges of treason.

== Rise to power ==
The rise and fall of Jikur is documented in the 14th-century Georgian Chronicle of A Hundred Years, which provides no information regarding his origin, but reports that Jikur, otherwise not particularly gifted and holding a relatively minor office of Master of Ceremonies (mestumre), rose to prominence thanks to his undaunted loyalty to David VII, whose troubled reign (1247–1270) was marred by the Mongol dominance. When David had to repair for the court of Batu Khan, he left his wife Jigda-Khatun as a regent and placed her under protection of Jikur. He was instrumental in reducing brigandage in the country, helped the construction of the royal palace at Isani in Tbilisi and levied tribute upon the fiercely independent mountaineers of Pkhovi. Considerable opposition to the authority of Jigda-Khatun and Jikur came from Torghva of Pankisi, the governor of Kakheti, who usurped the power in this region. Upon the king's return to Georgia, Torghva's courage began to fail and he retired to his fief of Pankisi. Jikur lured him out with the promise of security and had him murdered at the instigation of Jigda-Khatun.

== Downfall and death ==
Jikur's fortunes began to reverse after the death of Jigda-Khatun in 1252. The chronicle says that Jikur and David's new consort, Gvantsa Kakhaberidze, were enemies. Jikur's rivals, particularly Sumbat Orbeli, exploited this enmity and accused him before the king of treacherous connections with the Mongols. David, habitually gullible and prone to hasty decisions, had Jikur arrested and brought to the royal palace of Isani, overlooking the Mtkvari river, while his house was pillaged by the king's men. Without any inquiry, David ordered Jikur to be thrown into the river. On the next morning, his body was found washed up on the river bank. The king, giving in to urging of the poor of Tbilisi, allowed them to mourn and bury Jikur, who had no children of his own, at the newly rebuilt church of St. Christina.
