= Matskhvarishi church of the Savior =

Church building in Mestia Municipality, Georgia

- მაცხვარიშის მაცხოვრის ეკლესია
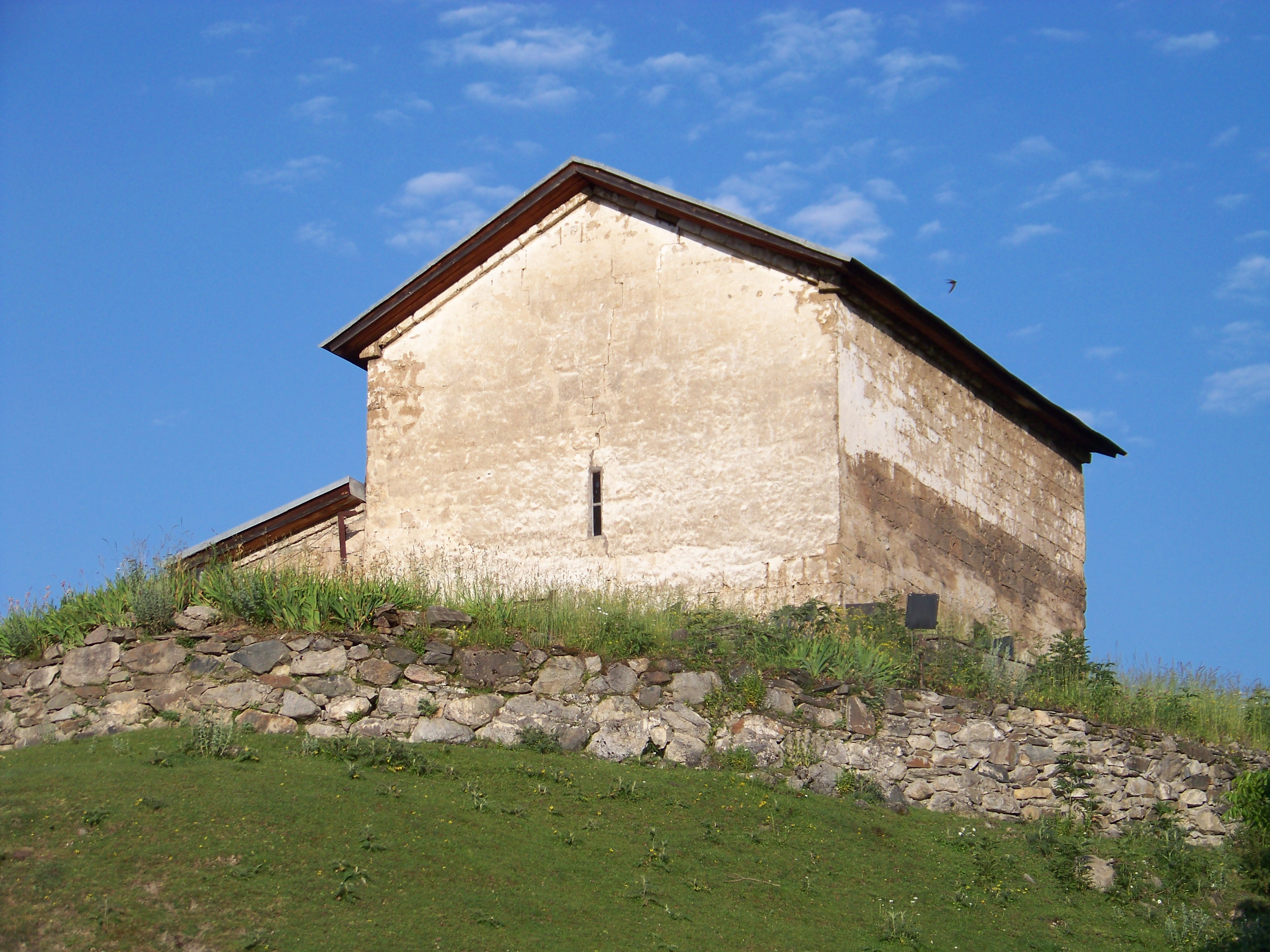
- Matskhvarishi church of the Savior
- Interactive map of Matskhvarishi church of the Savior
- Location: Matskhvarishi, Mestia Municipality, Samegrelo-Zemo Svaneti, Georgia
- Coordinates: 43.013883°N 42.625331°E
- Type: Hall church

The Matskhvarishi church of the Savior (Georgian: მაცხვარიშის მაცხოვრის ეკლესია, romanized: matskhvarishis matskhovris ek'lesia), also known as the church of Matskhvar (Svan: მაცხვარ), is a medieval Georgian Orthodox church in Mestia, Upper Svaneti. It is a simple hall church with extensive 12th-century frescoes. The church is inscribed on the list of the Immovable Cultural Monuments of National Significance of Georgia.

== Location ==
The church of the Savior stands on a hilltop above the settlement of Matskhvarishi at the west end of Latali community in what is now Mestia Municipality, at 1360 m above sea level. This part of Svaneti was known as Free Svaneti in the 19th century. The church housed a collection of Byzantine and Georgian church items which were catalogued by the scholar Ekvtime Takaishvili during his expedition to Svaneti in 1910.

== Layout ==
Matskhvar is a hall church, with an ambulatory annexed to the south façade. It is built of regular lines of well-hewn limestone block. Inside the church, a spacious bay is divided by a pair of two-step longitudinal wall pilasters from which springs a single arch, supporting the vault. The church is lit by four windows, one each in the sanctuary and west wall and two in the south wall. These latter two are arranged in an unusual manner: the western window is cut above the wall arch and the southern one below it. The church has three entrances—one each on the east, south, and north—rectangular in shape and topped by an arched tympanum internally. Arched niches flank the window in the sanctuary. The ambulatory was added to the southern end of the church at a later date. Of this structure only a sanctuary and arcade are original; it was remodeled in 1986. The outer walls are plain and were once plastered; the south façade bears traces of old frescoes. The south door is a 10th–11th-century decorative woodwork which is attributed by an accompanying inscription to Kvirike Agiduliani.

=== Frescoes ===
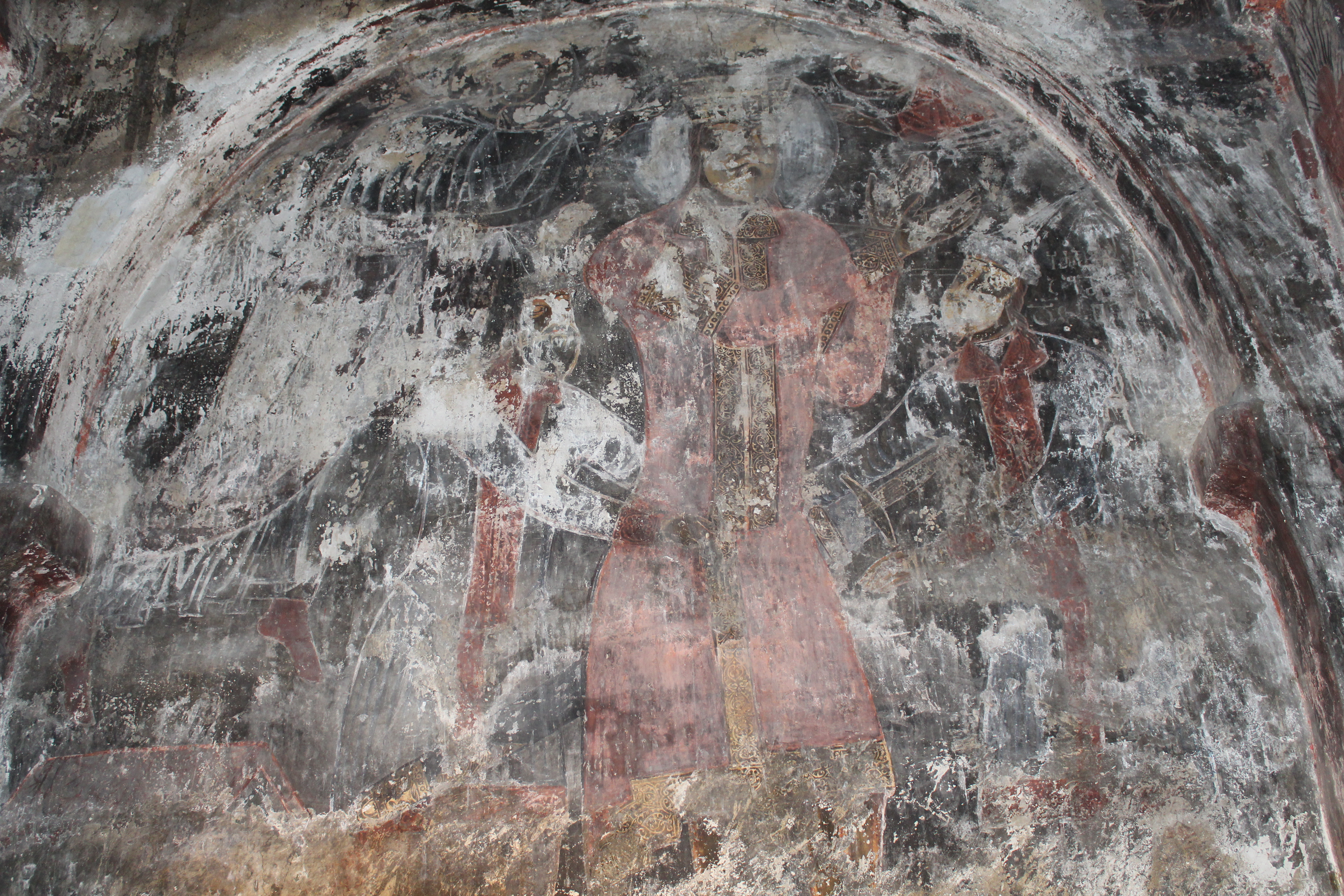
The coronation of Demetre I..

The interior of the church is entirely frescoed, but the paintings are now damaged. They are dated by an inscription to 1140 and credited to Michael Maglakeli. The sanctuary is traditionally adorned with the Deesis. Below it is a group of the Apostles, while the walls of the nave and conch contain a Christological cycle arranged in three registers and a series of haloed horseman, a recurrent image in the medieval Svan mural art. In the western arch of the north wall there is a scene of coronation in which King Demetre I of Georgia (r. 1125–1156) is shown being simultaneously blessed by Christ, crowned by the archangel Gabriel, and girded with a sword by two dignitaries, local eristavi. As the art historian Antony Eastmond has shown the depiction of Demetre's coronation celebrates the creation of royal power, while emphasizing the role of the local aristocracy.
