= Tevdore =

Medieval Georgian painter (fl. 11th and 12th centuries)

Tevdore (Georgian: თევდორე; fl. 11th–12th centuries) was a medieval Georgian religious mural and fresco painter active in the Kingdom of Georgia, at the royal court of King David IV "the Builder". He is best known for his frescoes of four temples in Upper Svaneti, (Note: Svaneti was the most remote and historically autonomous part of Georgia that took on particular importance for King David IV. Svaneti has always played a decisive role in the military history of Georgia, thus creating an essential natural barrier for the kingdom. The demonstration of the central power of the monarchy in this region of Georgia had special symbolic and defensive significance but also a historical as, there was a friction between King Giorgi II, the father of David IV, and the Svans, that has seen famous rebellion of the nobles under Ivane I of Kldekari and eristavi Vardan of Svaneti. David IV prioritizing Svaneti was evidencing a shift in the king’s relationship with local nobles. Some scholars also believe that Tevdore might have had his own personal ties with Svaneti.) northwestern Georgia. His late works are characterized by the rich decor, dynamic drawing and an accentuated three-dimensional concept of figure composition. Tevdore officially bore the title "King’s Painter", (Note: King David IV and Georgian royal court placed great emphasis on Tevdore's title and his execution of the frescoes and paintings in multiple churches in Svaneti and made it very clear who was behind this promotion since it openly demonstrated the special signiﬁcance for the realm. It was a key to understanding the anonymity of the king in all inscriptions by Tevdore.) referring to his prestige and his association with royal authority, during a remarkable time in the history of Georgia, serving under an all-powerful ruler who greatly expanded the monarchy after his victories over the Seljuks.

== Life ==
He served as a court painter to King David IV, which would testify to his close relationship with the monarch and his high position in the social hierarchy of the time. Tevdore, who held the prestigious title of "King’s Painter", per his inscriptions' clear indication, between AD 1096–1130, he would decorate three churches in Upper Svaneti, the northwestern highland region of Georgia. It is unknown where Tevdore was trained or found inspiration, although his style has some clear reflections of Komnenian art. It is believed that Tevdore was connected with the Iviron Monastery on Mount Athos, a major Georgian centre of religious scholarship. Per an anonymous 13th-century Armenian historian, King David "dispatched forty young men to Greece to study languages and make translations", it's hard to speculate if Tevdore was part of that group.

== Frescoes ==
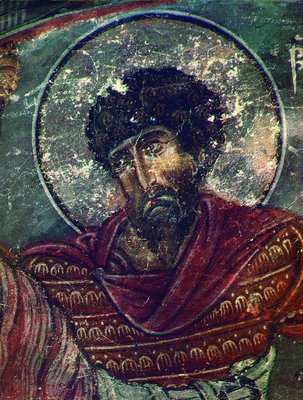
Theodore Stratelates, Iprari church fresco by Tevdore, AD 1096.

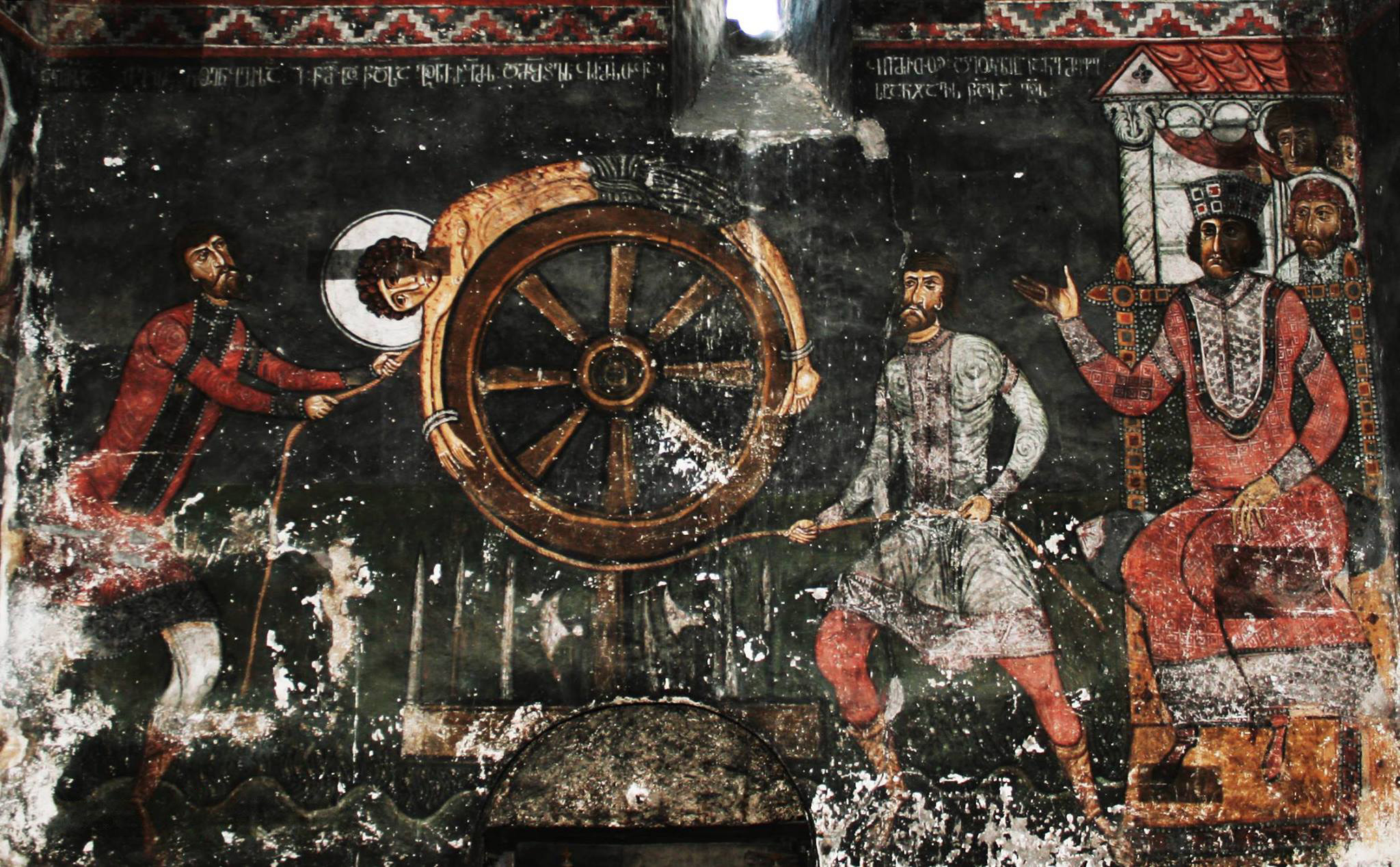
Fresco by Tevdore at Nakipari Church, depicting the torture of Saint George on the breaking wheel, looked upon by enthroned Diocletian and Magnentius, AD 1130.

The earliest fresco Tevdore would decorate was the interior of the Archangels’ Church in Iprari. The two-line inscription was executed in the Georgian Asomtavruli script written in white paint against a dark green background. The inscriptions preserved the painter's name, his title at the court and the exact dates of execution of the murals. Such exact date references make Tevdore's mural and frescoes fairly remarkable not only in Georgia, but across the medieval Orthodox world.

It runs across the top of the chancel barrier and the masonry structure with a central Royal Door with two lateral openings being in a typical form that were common in Svaneti. The Iprari murals were executed in a decorative-linear style, in which the author sought to indicate the volume of the figures through the rounded lines of the drapery. The apse would depict a Deesis and Majestas Domini (Note: The combined mural elements of Deesis and Majestas Domini was popular and dominant in medieval Georgia. It also appears to have been common in the regions where the Liturgy of Saint James was widespread.) composition, under which are the figures of three holy fathers, John Chrysostom, Basil of Caesarea and Gregory of Nazianzus, surrounded by two burning candlesticks. The frescoes on the walls and vaults are arranged in two horizontal lines: on the north wall is the Baptism of Jesus, frescoes of Saint George, Archangel Michael and the Prophet Joshua; on the south wall is the Nativity of the Lord, alongside Archangel Gabriel, Theodore Stratelates, the Mother of God and Saint Anne; and on the west wall is the Annunciation and the figures of Saint Barbara and Catherine of Alexandria. The iconographic composition would also include the figures of Demetrius of Thessaloniki and the Saint Stephen. The exterior of the southern facade of the temple was also completely covered with murals. Mural painting of multiple equestrian warrior saints and archangels by Tevdore at Iprari is thought to have a political context of protecting his ruler, King David IV, and the monarchy. (Note: Tevdore's emphasis on the archangels' role at the Iprari church mural conveys the idea of the divine protection of his monarch and the Georgian nation as a "God-seeking nation" among the true Christians. Tevdore wanted to convey a message of importance for the protection of a righteous king by the celestial host. This unique connection between the archangel and royal power was emphasized and promoted throughout the Byzantine world for many centuries. Georgia had a special devotion toward the victorious palladium of the Byzantine Emperors.)

Tevdore would include his name under the fresco, reading:

ႱႾႧႶႧ ႫႭႨႾႠႲႠ ႣႠ ႸႤႨႫႩႭ ႼႫႨႣႠ ႤႱႤ ႤႩႪႤႱႨႠႨ ႠႫႨႱ ႾႤႥႨႱႠ ႷႭႥႤႪႧႠ ႣႨႣႧႠ ႣႠ ႫႺႨႰႤႧႠ ႸႥႨႪႧႠ ႣႠ ႫႭႫႠႥႠႪႧႧႠ ႫႠႧႧႠ ႣႠ ႱႳႪႨႱႠ ႫႨႺႥႠႪႤႡႳႪႱႠ ႫႠႧႨႱႠ ႫႭႨႾႠႲႠ ႵႬ ႲႨႥ ႾႤႪႨႧႠ ႧႤႥႣႭႰႤ ႫႤႴႨႱ ႫႾႠႲႥႰႨႱႠჂႧႠ ႼႫ ႫႧႥႠႬႢ ႸႼႷ

Christ, this holy church was painted and adorned through prayer of the aznaurs of khevi, all minors and majors, for their children and for the souls of their deceased. Holy Archangels have mercy in both lives Amen. It was painted in the year kh since the creation, koronikon (Note: Koronikon is a Georgian dating system via numerals used from the 8th century.) ႲႨႥ (316) (i. e. AD 1096), by the hand of Tevdore, the King’s Painter, saint Archangels. Have mercy.

Tevdore's works are characterized by rigor and monumentality, which already in his early period testifies to the maturity of artistic expression. The same inscription on the triumphal arch also confirms the authorship of the painting of the Church of Lagurka, near the village of Khe. Per Shalva Amiranashvili, his frescoes are dated AD 1112. Compared to Iprari, the emotional side of the depicted figures is more significantly developed at the Lagurka compositions. Another work by Tevdore, is the painting of the Church of Saint George in Nakipari, dated AD 1130. The frescoes have been preserved in mostly good condition. The monumental character, color palette and the style of drawing, based on the distribution of areas, follow on from previous tradition, but at the same time show certain differences. In Nakipari, Tevdore would limit himself to the use of color accents and avoided turquoise tones. Chronologically, this painting follows the Lagurka and Iprari, clearly documenting development of the author's style, especially in the deepening of emotionality and dramatic expression.

== See also ==
- Damiane
- Michael Maglakeli

== Bibliography ==
- Studer-Karlen, M., Bacci, M. & Chitishvili, N. (2023) Medieval Svaneti, Objects, Images, and Bodies in Dialogue with Built and Natural Spaces, CONVIVIUM SUPPLEMENTUM 2023/2, Seminarium Kondakovianum, Series Nova, Faculté des Lettres, Université de Lausanne, ISBN 978-80-280-0382-1 (print)
- Chichinadze, N. (2018) "King's Painter" Tevdore and his Inscriptions, Ilia State University, Tbilisi, (DOI) doi.org/10.2298/ZOG1842025C
- Gedevanishvili, E. (2021) Cult and Image of St. George in Medieval Georgian Art, Late Antique and Byzantine Archaeology and Art Seminar, The Department of History of Art, University of Oxford
- Janjalia, M. & Bulia, M. (2024) Rethinking the labels. Wall paintings by royal painter Tevdore in the Georgian highlands, George Chubinashvili National Research Centre for Georgian Art History and Heritage Preservation, Tbilisi, (DOI) doi.orgs/10.2298/ZOG2448027J
