= Michael Maglakeli =

Michael Maglakeli (Georgian: მიქაელ მაღლაკელი, romanized: mikael maghlak'eli; fl. 12th century) was a medieval Georgian religious mural and fresco painter active in the Kingdom of Georgia, at the royal court during the reign of King David IV the Builder and his son and heir, King Demetre I.

== Life ==
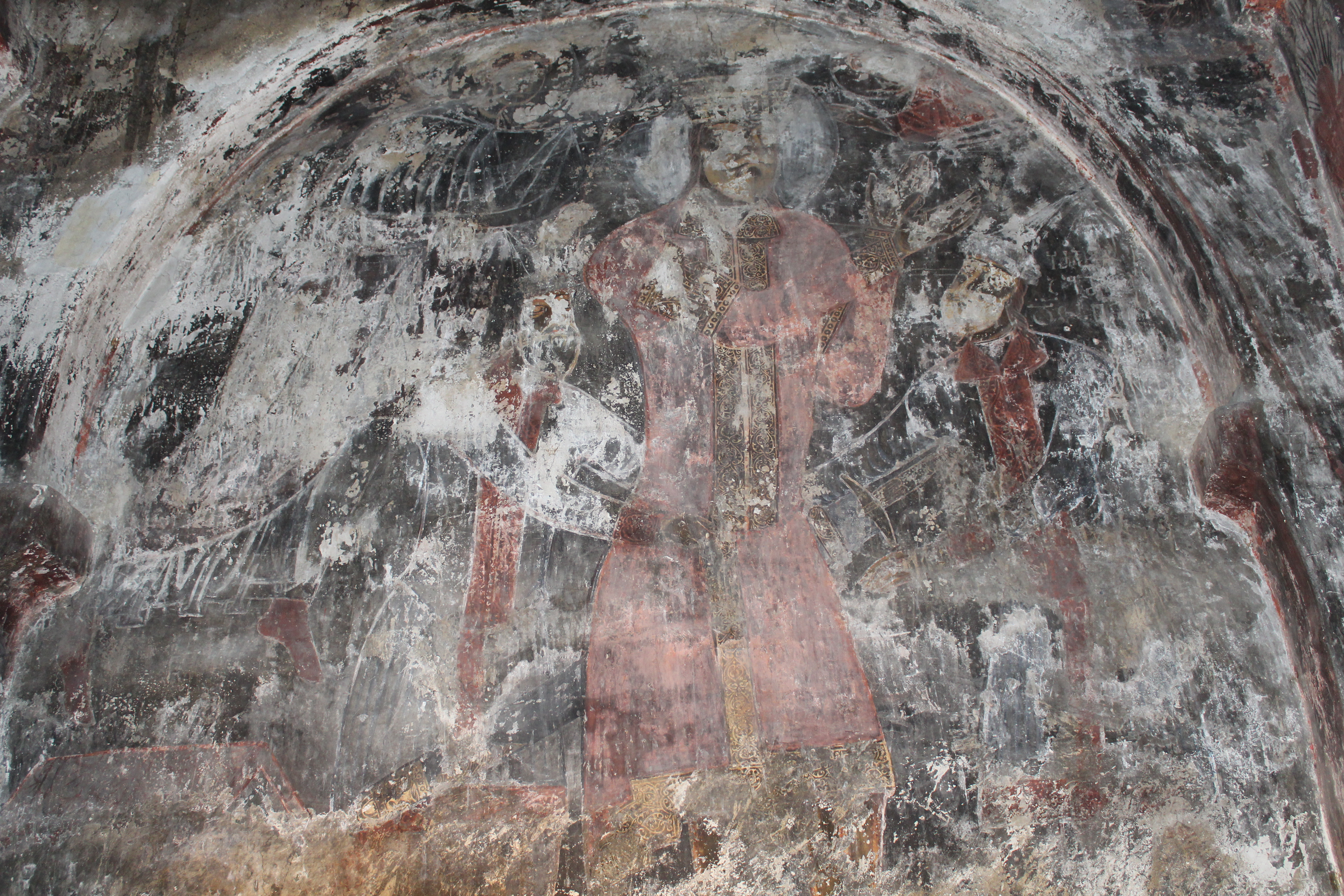
The coronation scene of Demetre I shows the king being blessed by Jesus, while the archangel Gabriel crowns him and two eristavis gird him with a "Sword of David".

More information about the date or place of his birth and death is not known. He probably came from some area of Imereti. Specifically, probably from the village of the same name, Maglaki (or Maghlaki).

An important attributed work are his frescoes in the Matskhvarishi church of the Savior. Several inscriptions have been preserved in the monastery. One of them states that Michael Maglakeli was the author of the temple painting in 1140. The apse space is decorated with the motives of Deesis. Below him is a group of prophets and apostles, while the walls of the monastery are decorated with a christological cycle of scenes from the twelve great feasts (dodecaorton), which are arranged in three rows. The lowest row shows a series of horsemen with a halo around their heads, which are characteristic of medieval wall painting in the Svaneti province. In the northeastern niche is Saint Barbara and the coronation of Catherine of Alexandria. On the contrary, in the south-eastern niche are Margaret the Virgin and St. Irene together with the donor of the temple. Saint George and Demetrius of Thessaloniki are depicted in the southwest niche. Northwestern niche also depicts the coronation of the Georgian king Demetre I. The king is depicted in magnificent royal robes, receiving a blessing from Jesus Christ and a crown from the archangel Gabriel, with two nobles (eristavis) girding her with sword. The depiction of Demetre's coronation is both a celebration of royal power and an emphasis on the role of the local aristocracy.

In the scene of the coronation of King Demetre I, Maglakeli followed older iconographic traditions from the Byzantine Empire, which he supplemented with local elements. In general, his work is influenced by the murals created by another Georgian court painter Tevdore (i.e. Theodore). From an artistic and stylistic point of view, Maglakeli continued the intentions of the monumental wall painting of the 11th century – the over-dimensionality and individuality of the composition. His monumental figures are characterized by stiffness and strength. The internal dynamics are not highlighted. In addition, the signs of the decorative-monumental painting style of the 12th-13th centuries are noteworthy, as they follow certain features established traditions of the wall paintings from the Ateni Sioni Church and the Betania Monastery. Maglakeli used nuances of two main colors in his work, gray and reddish-brown. His messaging was ambivalent but imperial.

== See also ==
- Damiane
- Tevdore

== Bibliography ==
- Eastmond, A. (1998) Royal imagery in medieval Georgia, Pennsylvania State University, ISBN 978-0-271-01628-3
- Lazarev, V. (1986) History of the Byzantine painting, Publisher Iskusstvo
- Studer-Karlen, M., Bacci, M. & Kaffenberger, T. (2018) Cultural Interactions in Medieval Georgia, Dr. Ludwig Reichert Verlag, ISBN 978-3-95490-665-9
- Schwartz, Ellen C. (2021) The Oxford Handbook of Byzantine Art and Architecture; ISBN 978-0-19-027735-2; Oxford University Press
- Baumer, C. (2021) History of the Caucasus: Volume 1: At the Crossroads of Empires; ISBN 978-0-7556-3969-4; Bloomsbury Publishing
