= Arghun Aqa =

13th century Mongol governor

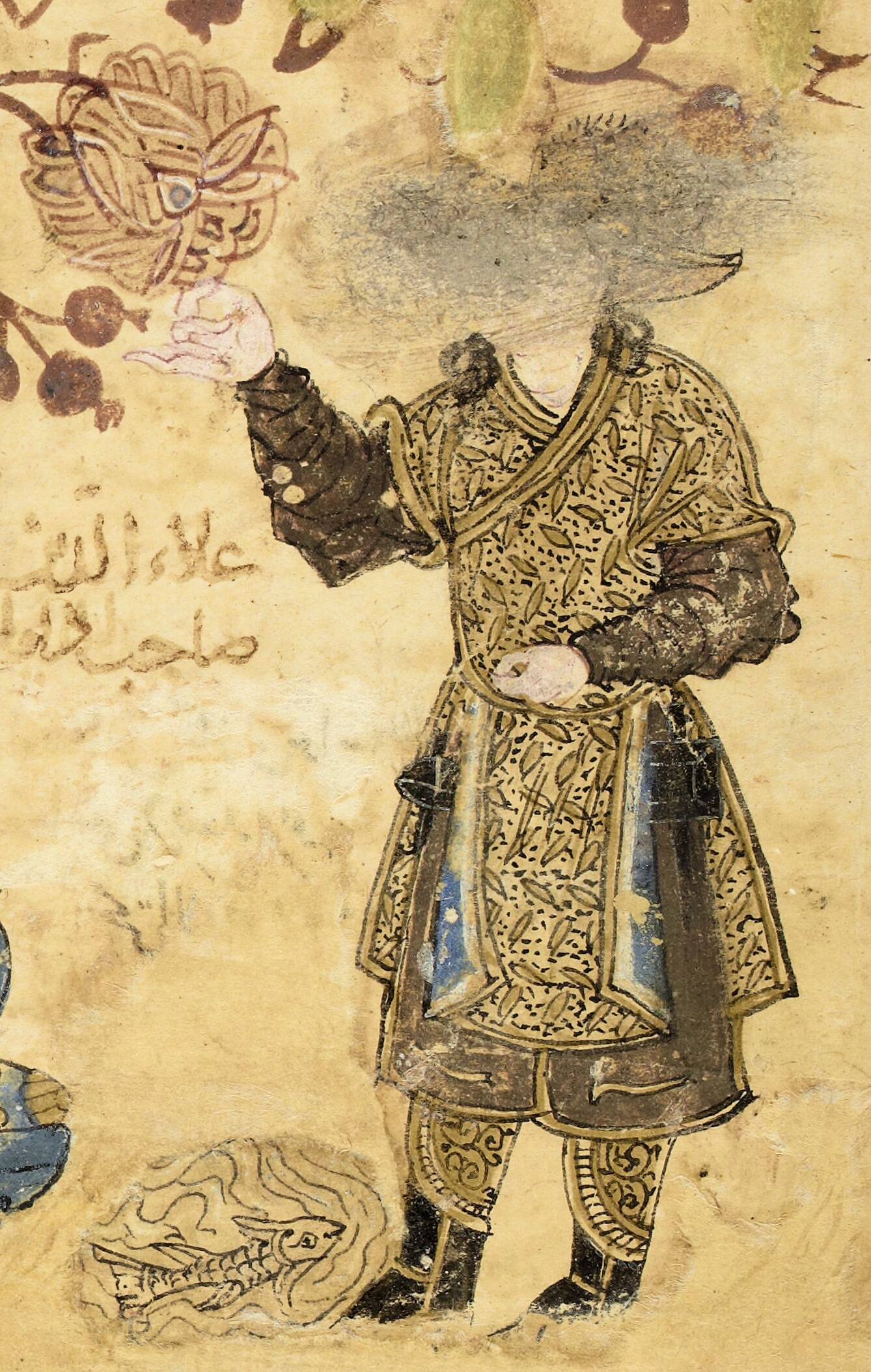
- Arghun Aqa (damaged) in Tārīkh-i Jahān-Gushā 'The History of The World Conqueror", dated 1290. Bibliothèque Nationale de France (Suppl. Pers. 205).

Darughachi of Persia, Georgia and Anatolia
- In office 1243–1275
- Preceded by: Korguz
- Succeeded by: Buqa

Deputy Governor of Khorasan
- In office 1265–1275
- Governor: Prince Tubshin

Personal details
- Born: c. 1210
- Died: June 17, 1275 (aged 64–65) Khorasan

Arghun Agha, also Arghun Aqa or Arghun the Elder (Persian: ارغون آقا; Mongolian: ᠠᠷᠭᠤᠨ; fl. 1220 - 1275) was a Mongol noble of the Oirat clan in the 13th century. He was a governor in the Mongol-controlled area of Persia from 1243 to 1255, before the Ilkhanate was created by Hulagu. Arghun Agha was in control of the four districts of eastern and central Persia, as decreed by the great khan Möngke Khan.

== Early life ==
According to Rashid al-Din, when he was young, his father sold his son Arghun to Qadan of the Jalayir, tutor of Ögedei who passed him to his son Ilüge, while according to Juvayni his father was a mingghan commander. During his years with the Ogedeyid family, he gained reputation among the members of the ruling blood because he was well educated and versed in Old Uyghur language. Arghun started his career as bitikchi (secretary) during the reign of Ögedei. Later on, the latter's consort, Toregene Khatun, appointed him as then governor of Transoxiana - Korguz's basqaq and ultimately overall civil governor after Korguz's execution in c. 1242.

== Career ==
He was appointed to oversee vast lands from Oxus to Anatolia with Sharaf al-Din Khwarazmi as his secretary, whom he had a distaste in. His position was reaffirmed by Güyük Khan in 1246. Ascelin of Lombardia might have met him while he was at the court of Baiju in c. 1247. He visited Karakorum twice after his appointment in 1248 and 1251. On his third voyage, he was upheld by Hulagu in Transoxiana and was released after a while. His employees included the famous Juvayni family, Fakr al-Din Bihishti (d. 1256), Husam al-Din Bihishti, Najm al-Din Ali, Turumtai, Naimadai, etc. He made a census in Persia in accordance with the decree of Möngke in 1254 along with Najm al-Din Ali. He participated in Hulagu's campaign against the Nizaris in Persia in 1256.

=== Georgian campaign ===
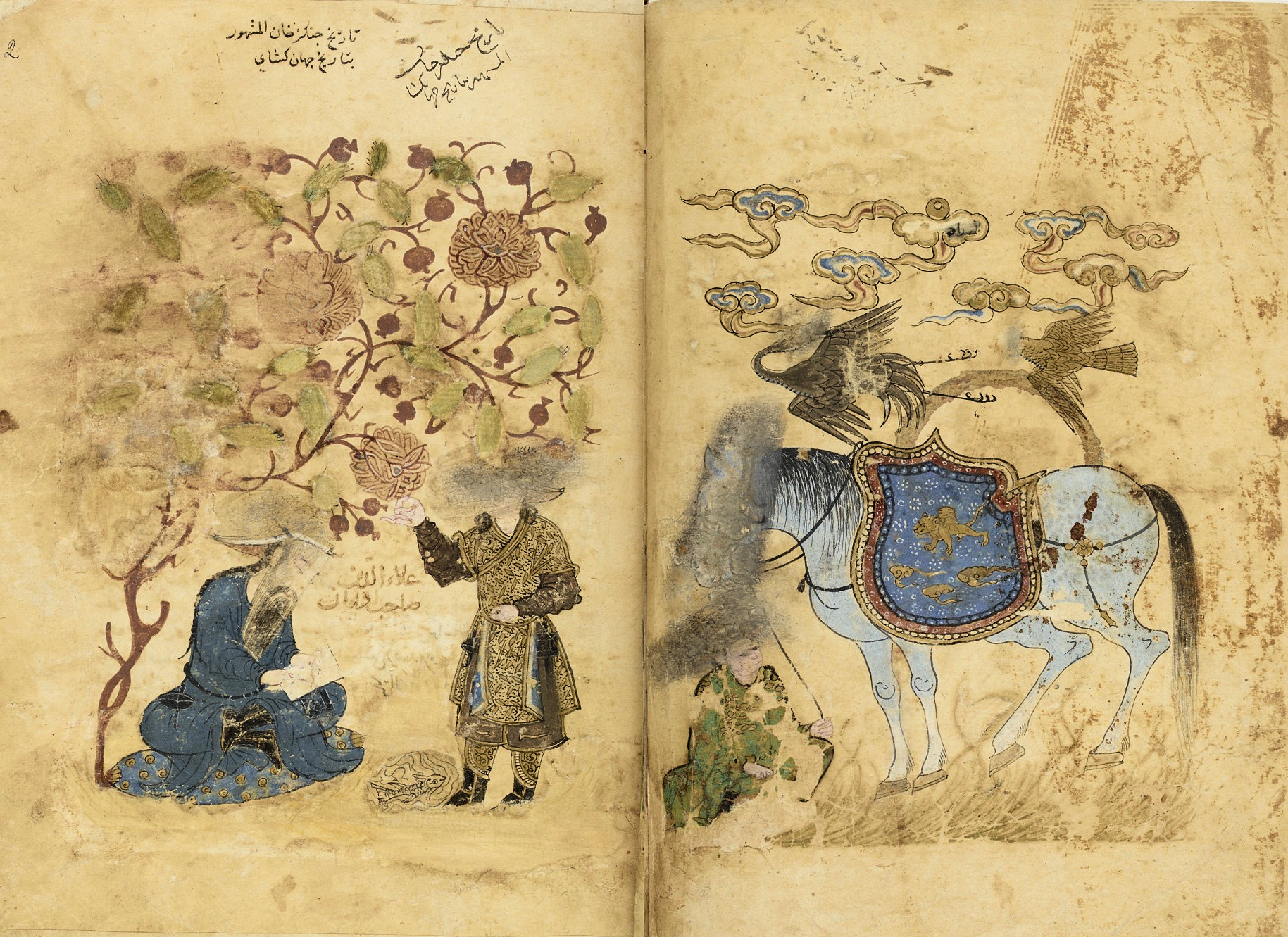
Frontispiece (1290) of Tarikh-i Jahangushay: Ata-Malik Juvayni sits and writes in front of Arghun Aqa.

In 1259-61 he directed punitive operations against rebels in Georgia. When in 1260 Hulegu Khan requested the presence of Georgians and Armenians for the Mongol invasions of the Levant, David Ulu, king of the Eastern Kingdom of Georgia rebelled, remembering the losses of his troops in the 1258 Siege of Baghdad. A large Mongol army led by Arghun Aqa invaded Georgia from the south, inflicted a heavy defeat on David and Sargis I Jaqeli in a battle near Akhaldaba, and then brutally plundered the country. The Mongol campaign continued during the winter, and the following year king David Ulu was forced to flee to Imereti, which the Mongols failed to conquer. David's family was captured, and his wife Gvantsa was killed. Peace with the Mongols was achieved in 1262, when David Ulu returned to Tbilisi to reclaim his crown as a Mongol vassal, pledging allegiance to Hulegu, while David Narin nominally recognized Mongol rule in Imereti. Hulegu tolerated the rebel because since 1261, the Il-kan was at war with the Berke of Golden Horde, which was on a larger scale.

Arghun Aqa was then sent to Khorasan to fight the Golden Horde. He is described as faithful servant of the Qaghan in Persian sources while the Georgian and Armenian sources say he was cruel and violent overseer. However, one Georgian chronicle says he was a friend of equity, trustful in his language, a deep thinker, and profound in counsel. It also says Arghun conducted the empire-wide census in Russia, Arctic, Alania, Pontic steppe, Georgia, Armenia, and Anatolia. Arghun had many political enemies at the headquarters, so he had to visit the ordo of the Qaghan in Mongolia often to prove his loyalty. Although, Möngke appointed him to his former position after his accession in 1252, the Emperor summoned Arghun to answer a charge of treason. The Armenian noble, Sempad Orpelian, justified Arghun completely and charged his enemy, a Khorazmi lieutenant, with being the real offender. Arghun was released and they returned together.

=== Under Hulagu ===
He mainted his administrative tasks under Hulagu and even punished underpaying vassals who owed them taxes, including Gvantsa Kakhaberidze, Hasan Jalal of Khachen, Zakare III Zakarian, Akhsitan II and others in 1261. He accompanied Prince Abaqa in support of Alghu against his struggle with Golden Horde.

=== Under Abaqa ===
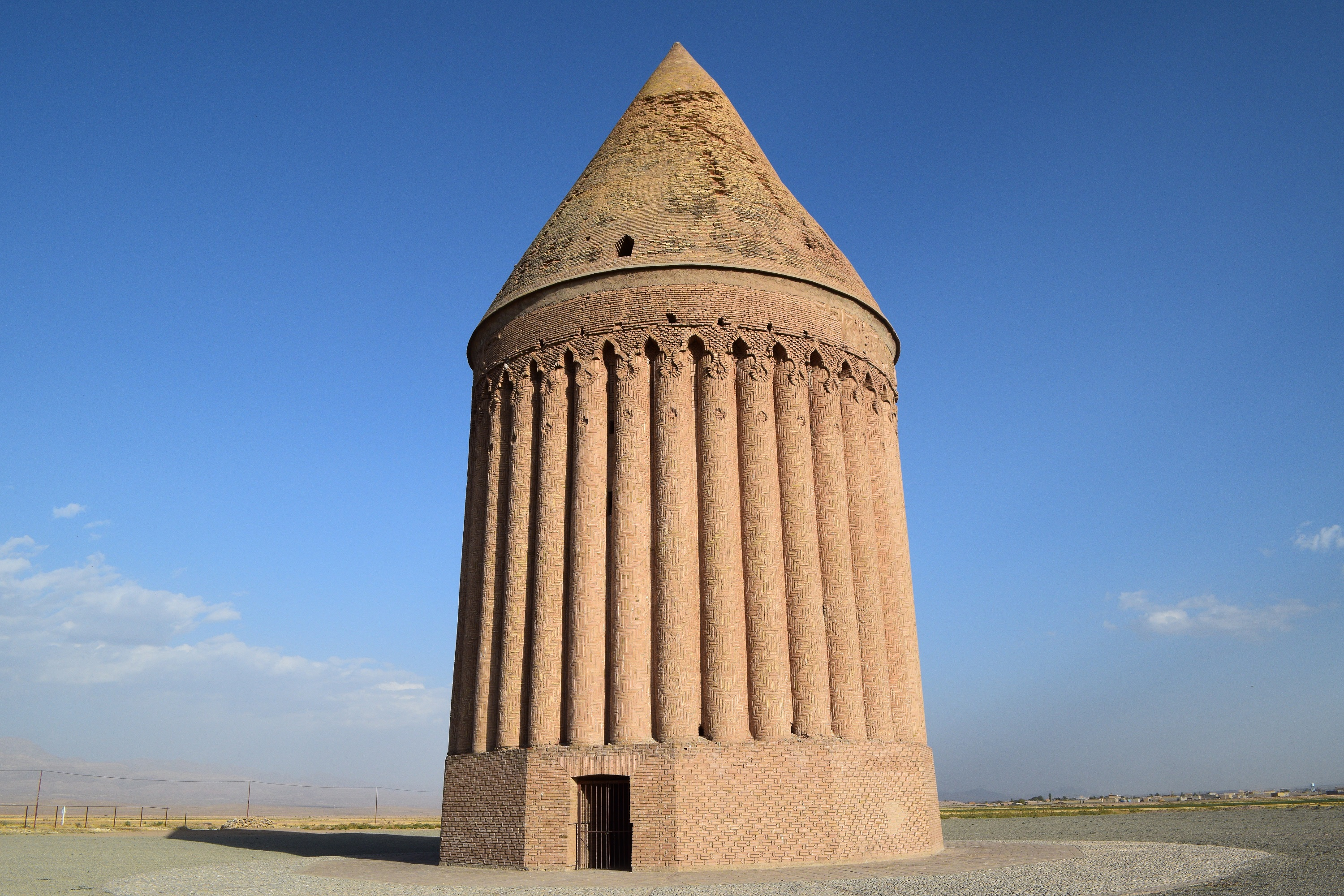
Mil-i Radkan is believed to be tomb of Arghun Aqa

Arghun continued to serve Ilkhanate after death of Hulagu in 1265. His new post was in Khorasan, as deputy of Prince Tubshin. New Chagatai khan Baraq threatened to invade Ilkhanate until they leave Afghanistan to them in 1270. Arghun Aqa fought in left flank under Prince Yoshmut in Battle of Herat on 22 July 1270 which resulted in a decisive victory. He served in Khorasan till his death on 17 June 1275.

== Legacy ==
He appears to have funded Pir Huseyn Khanqah in Qubalıbalaoğlan, modern Azerbaijan. He is thought to be buried in Radkan, Khorasan.

== Family ==
He had many wives, including a daughter of Yesü Möngke, to whom he married in 1249. Another wife of his was Sürmish, who gave birth to Nawruz. He had at least 14 sons and 4 daughters:

- A son (died 1270 in Herat)
- Girai Malik
- Tatarji
- Nawruz (d. 13 August 1297)
- Lagzi Güregen (d. 2 April 1297) — married to Baba Khatun (daughter of Hulagu)
  - Terjughan Khatun — married to Öljaitü
- Hajji
- Tarkhan Hajji
  - A daughter — married Fakhr al-Din ibn Rukn al-Din of Kartids (1295–1308)
- Yol Qutlugh
- Bulquq
- Oiratai
- Ertai Ghazan (d. 1297)
- Narin Hajji (d. 1297, Hamadan)
- Arghun Hajji
- Mengli Buqa
- Barghun Hajji
- Emine Khatun (died c. 1300 and buried in Salmas) — possibly married to Taj al-Din 'Ali Shah, vizier.
- Begi Khatun or Ilkuye Begi — married to Muzaffar al-Din Hajjaj in 1263/4
- A daughter — married to Kingshü, son of Jumghur
- Menglitegin — married to Amir Tasu of Eljigin clan of Khongirad
  - Bulughan Khatun Khorasani — married to Ghazan
