= George (son of David VII of Georgia) =

Georgian prince (1250–1268)

- Born: 1250
- Died: 1268 (aged 17–18)
- Burial: Svetitskhoveli Cathedral
- Dynasty: Bagrationi
- Father: David VII
- Mother: Altun; Jigda-Khatun (step-mother)
- Religion: Georgian Orthodox Church

George (Georgian: გიორგი, romanized: giorgi) (1250–1268) was a Georgian prince of the 13th century. He was the son of King David VII Ulu, and the designated heir to the throne of eastern Georgia. George is primarily remembered for his captivity at the Mongol court of Hulegu Khan. After being held as a hostage for a year, he was released and later took part in several military campaigns alongside his father. He died in 1268, before succeeding to the throne.

== Biography ==
George was born in 1250, according to Vakhushti Bagrationi. He was the first son of King David VII Ulu of Georgia (1247–1270) and his temporary consort, Altun, an Alan woman whom the king married for the purpose of producing an heir. After the birth of a second child, Tamar, Altun was sent back to Alania, and George was subsequently adopted by Queen Jigda-Khatun. From that point onward, he was recognized as the heir to the Georgian throne. George, along with his father, step-mother, and David VI Narin is mentioned in a church inscription from Abelia in the south of Georgia.

Shortly after the revolt of the co-king David VI Narin in western Georgia in 1259, the Il-Khan Hulegu Khan sought to strengthen his ties with David Ulu, who was also in rebellion. Hulegu proposed a peace agreement with Georgia, agreeing to release his Georgian hostages—the queen Gvantsa and Prince Demetrius—and to recognize David VII as the legitimate ruler of the kingdom. In return, the young George was sent to Persia as a hostage.

Accompanied by the Christian envoy Enuk Arkun, George traveled to the Mongol court, passing through Tbilisi, where he was received with honor by the Georgian nobility and placed under the protection of the Mongol ambassador Arghun. Upon his arrival in Persia, the Georgian prince was courteously welcomed by Hulegu Khan and resided at the Mongol court for a year. During his stay, he reportedly developed a close relationship with Queen Doquz Khatun.

However, when the Mongols violated the peace treaty previously concluded with Georgia, King David VII refused to visit the Mongol court to meet his son. Enraged by this defiance, Hulegu Khan ordered George’s execution. The intervention of Enuk Arkun and Queen Doquz Khatun saved the young prince’s life, and he was subsequently sent back to his father.

Around 1265, George took part in a campaign alongside his father against the Tatars. During this time, he fell gravely ill, leading many to believe he had died. According to The Georgian Chronicles, national prayers were held for his recovery, after which George was miraculously cured. The illness, however, was said to have passed to King David, who later recovered as well.

In 1268, George once again fell ill with a similar disease and died at the age of 18. Vakhushti Bagrationi describes King David’s grief in the following terms:

“When he was told of his son’s death, he fell at once, half-dead. He was carried away in the arms of his attendants, and great effort was needed to revive him. The king, it is said, was seized with boundless sorrow; to the anguish of paternal love was added the memory of the extraordinary beauty of the eighteen-year-old youth, of his courage, and of his military virtues. He wept bitterly and invoked death when he beheld the lifeless remains of his beloved George, his son, his prince, lying pale and bathed in the tears of the people.”

Initially interred in the Church of Sion, George’s remains were later ceremoniously transferred to Mtskheta, the religious capital of Georgia. King David VII Ulu never recovered from the loss of his son and died two years later, in 1270, leaving the throne to his younger son, Demetrius.

== Bibliography ==
- Asatiani, Nodar; Janelidze, Otar (2009). History of Georgia. Tbilisi: Publishing House Petite. ISBN 978-9941-9063-6-7.
- Brosset, Marie-Félicité (1849). Histoire de la Géorgie, depuis l'Antiquité jusqu'au XIXe siècle - 1re partie. St. Petersburg: Saint Petersburg Academy of Sciences.
- Howorth, Henry H. (1888). History of the Mongols from the 9th to the 19th century. Part III. London: Longmans, Green, And Co.
- Metreveli, Roin, ed. (2008). "„ასწლოვანი მატიანე"" [Chronicle of A Hundred Years] (PDF). ქართლის ცხოვრება [Kartlis Tskhovreba] (in Georgian). Tbilisi: Artanuji. Archived from the original (PDF) on 2012-04-01.
- Salia, Kalistrat (1980). Histoire de la nation géorgienne [History of the Georgian nation] (in French). Paris: Nino Salia.
