= Abelia church =

Church building in Tetri Tsqaro, Georgia

Abelia
- აბელია
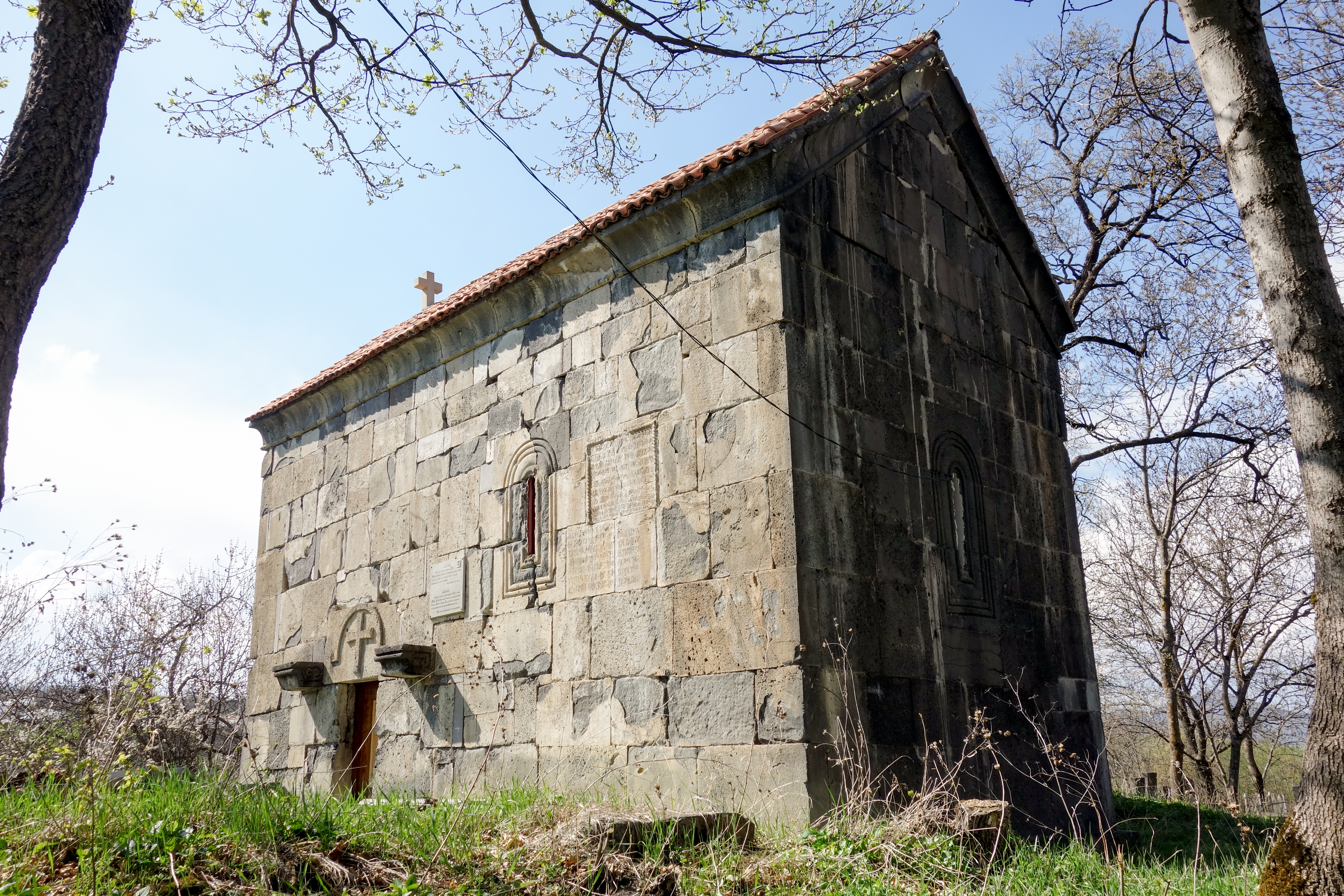
- Abelia church. Southern and eastern facades.
- Interactive map of Abelia
- Location: Abeliani, Tetri Tsqaro Municipality, Kvemo Kartli, Georgia
- Coordinates: 41.572359°N 44.500641°E
- Type: Single-nave church

The Abelia church of the Trinity (Georgian: აბელიის სამების ეკლესია, romanized: abeliis samebis ek'lesia) is a 13th-century Georgian Orthodox church, located in the Tetri Tsqaro Municipality in Georgia's south-central region of Kvemo Kartli. A simple single-nave design, it is situated at the outskirts of the modern-day village of Abeliani, formerly known as Abelia. A reference to the diarchy in Georgia under the Mongol rule in an inscription on the church's southern wall makes it possible to date the construction to the period of 1250–1259. The church is inscribed on the list of the Immovable Cultural Monuments of National Significance of Georgia.

== Location ==
The Abelia church is located at the foothills of Mount Sameba in the Kvemo Kartli region. This locale, first mentioned as Abelia in a document dated to 1580, was populated already in the Early Bronze Age as evidenced by the archaeological digs in the 1950s. The site has also yielded a 5th–3rd century BC necropolis with bronze, iron, and glassware artifacts, including seals with hunting scenes. The area, completely deserted in the 18th century and subsequently largely reclaimed by nature, was visited and its antiquities, including the Abelia church, were first described by the Georgian scholar Ekvtime Taqaishvili in the early 1900s.

== Architecture ==
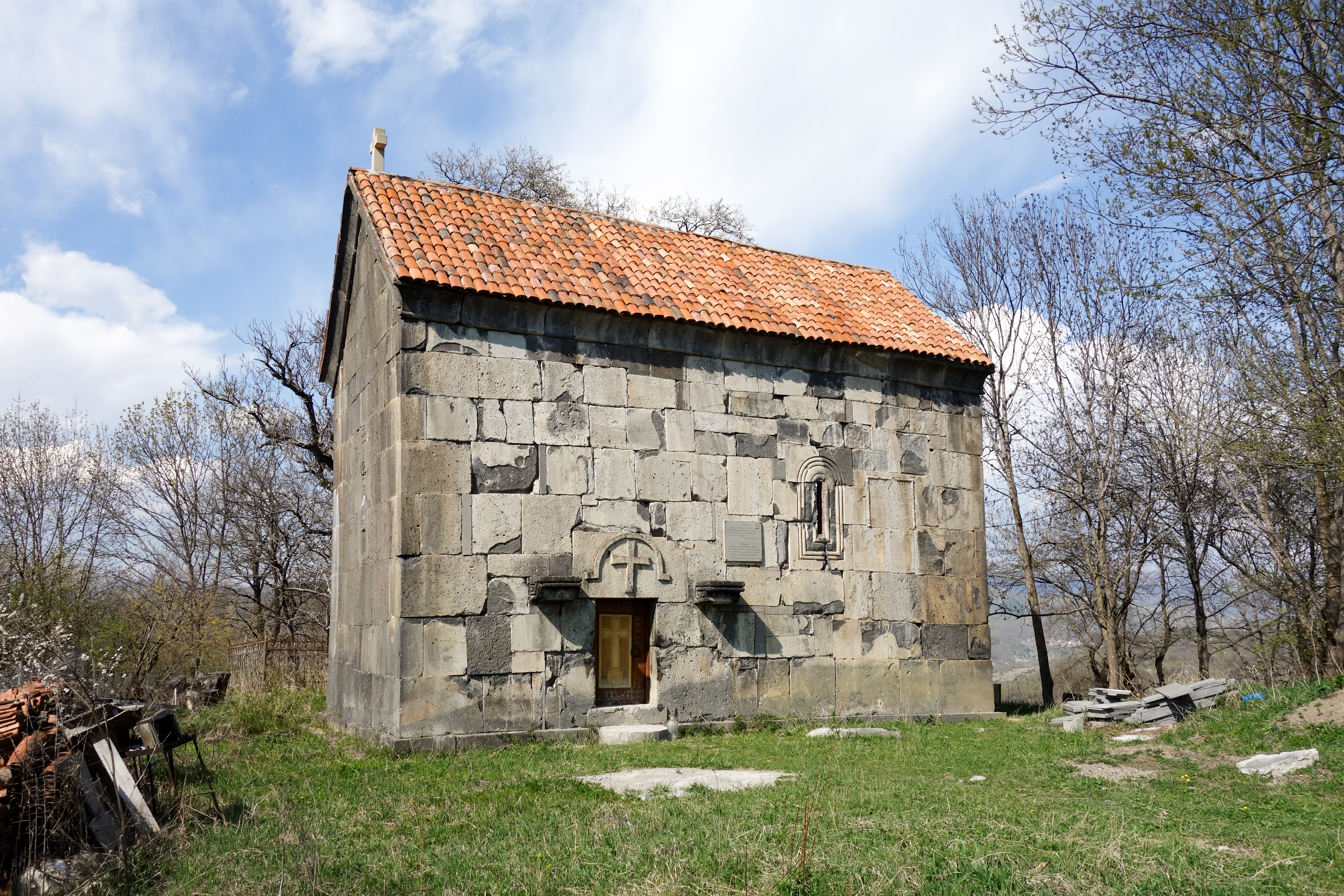
Abelia church. Southern and western facades.

Abelia is a small single-nave church which has largely preserved its original architectural form. It is built of large regular grey porous dolerite blocks and faced with hewn stone, with the exception of the vault which is made of rubble. An elongated hall is divided into two chambers by a middle supporting arch and terminates in a semi-circular apse on the east. The apse characteristically narrows in towards the conch. The sole entrance is on the south and each wall, with the exception of the northern one, is pierced with a single window. The interior had once been frescoed; with time, they have mostly faded away. Outer walls are extremely poor in decoration. On either side of the architrave stone there are two prominent brackets which had once probably supported arches of the now-lost annex. The church was renovated through a government-funded program in 2006.

== Inscription ==
The southern facade is adorned with a lengthy inscription in the medieval Georgian asomtavruli script, arranged in 23 horizontal lines. The inscription is made in the name of Arsen Mshuidaisdze, archbishop of Manglisi, and mentions the coregnant kings of Georgia, David Ulu and David Narin, the former's wife Queen Tamar-Khatun and their son Giorgi. Tamar was a Christian, and royal name, of Jigda-Khatun, a Seljuq or Mongol princess by origin. The text then goes on lamenting hardships the church-builders had to endure at the time when "the Tatars had conquered this kingdom and the whole of the country", a reference to the Mongol domination of Georgia.
