= Jigda-Khatun =

13th-century Queen of Georgia

Queen consort of Georgia
- Tenure: 1247 – 1252
- Died: 1252; Mtskheta, Kingdom of Georgia
- Burial: Mtskheta
- Spouse: David VII (m. 1247)
- Issue: adopted George

Jigda-Khatun (Georgian: ჯიგდა-ხათუნი) (died 1252) was a Queen consort of Georgia as the first wife of King David VII. She served as regent during her husband's absence.

== Origin and marriage ==
According to the modern historian Ivane Javakhishvili, David might have married her, around 1247, for political reasons while he stayed at the court of the Mongol Khagan Güyük, pending his recognition as the king of Georgia and settlement of a succession dispute with his namesake cousin, David VI Narin. Another modern scholar Cyril Toumanoff considers Jigda a Seljuk princess, daughter of the sultan of Rum. An inscription from the Abelia church in the south of Georgia mentions her as Tamar-Khatun, indicating that she received a new, Christian name in Georgia.

== Regency ==
Jigda-Khatun's involvement in the government of Georgia was occasioned by David's departure for the court of Batu Khan, when she, together with the courtier Jikur, was left in charge of regency. Jikur, although holding a relatively minor office of Master of Ceremonies (mestumre), had risen to prominence thanks to his undaunted loyalty to David and had been instrumental in reducing brigandage in the country. Thus, Jikur was left to protect the queen in Tbilisi. He was also responsible for the construction of the royal palace at Isani and levying tribute upon the "savage" mountaineers of Pkhovi. Jigda-Khatun's regency was defied by the nobleman Torghva of Pankisi, who attempted to secede in Kakheti, a region entrusted to him by David. Upon the king's return to Georgia, Torghva's courage began to fail and he fell back to his fief of Pankisi. Jikur lured him out with the promise of security, but had him murdered at the instigation of Jigda-Khatun.

== Issue of succession and death ==
As Jigda-Khatun remained childless, a fact that was a source of great concern for the Georgian nobles, David took, c. 1249, a temporary wife, the beautiful Alan woman Altun, whom he agreed to dismiss after the birth of an heir. Their son, George, was born in 1250, and adopted by Jigda-Khatun. David's union with Altun was repudiated after the birth of a second child, the daughter Tamar. Jigda-Khatun died in 1252, and was buried at the reginal necropolis in Mtskheta. David soon married his third wife, Gvantsa Kakhaberidze.

== Notes ==
Royal titles
Preceded by Theodora Doukaina Palaiologina	Queen consort of Georgia c. 1247–1252	Succeeded by Gvantsa Kakhaberidze
