= Chormaqan =

General of the Mongol Empire

Chormaqan Noyan
- ᠴᠷᠮᠠᠭᠠᠨ ᠬᠣᠷᠴᠢ

Viceroy of Mongol Empire in Near East
- In office 1230–1241
- Appointed by: Ögedei
- Succeeded by: Baiju Noyan

Personal details
- Died: 1241
- Spouse: Altani

Chormaqan (also Chormagan or Chormaqan Noyan) (Mongolian: ᠴᠣᠷᠮᠠᠭᠠᠨ ᠬᠣᠷᠴᠢ; Chagatai: جورماقان; Khalkha Mongolian: Чормаган; died c. 1241) was one of the most famous generals of the Mongol Empire under Genghis Khan and Ögedei Khan. He was also a member of the keshik.

== Career ==
A member of the Sunud tribe, Chormaqan is mentioned in The Secret History of Mongols many times. He probably participated in the Mongol campaigns in North China and later in the Subutai's and Jebe's famous journey through Caucasus and Russian steppes. He was a quiver bearer, as such often mentioned in sources as "Qurchi".

He was appointed by Ögedei in the winter of 1230 to renew the Mongol conquests in Persia, which had languished since Genghis Khan's assault on and near destruction of the Khwarezmid Empire from 1218 to 1223. His army reportedly consisted of around 30,000 to 50,000 men. At the approach of Chormagan and the new Mongol army, the small Khwarezmid band under Jalal ad-Din were swept away. Further campaigns in the mid-1230s, based from the steppes in Azerbaijan around Tabriz, firmly established the Kingdom of Georgia and Armenian Kingdom of Cilicia as vassals to the Mongols. It is theorized that these moves may have been made to secure communications for the attack westward led by Batu that followed shortly thereafter.

Chormaqan also received the submission of the Qutlugkhanids in Kerman, whose ruler Buraq Hajib sent his son Rukn al-Din Mubarak Khwaja to Ögedei's court. Another local noble who submitted was Salghurid atabeg Abu Bakr b. Sa'd I, who sent his brother or nephew Tahamtan to Karakorum. Isfahan did not submit to Mongol rule, therefore he had to lay a siege to there in 1236. Upon submission of Georgian and Armenian feudals, he divided Georgia up to 8 tumens and set up Ganja as his powerbase, although some sources state he Ani, Kars and environs. His rule weakened in 1239 on arrival of Chinqai and Korguz to Khorasan, to whom fiscal administrator was transferred by Ögedei.

Chormaqan died around 1241 and was replaced by Baiju, his lieutenant.

== Family ==
His wife Altani held considerable amount of influence in ordo, upon whose suggestion Baiju was appointed. His son Shiramun later served under the Il-khans Hulagu and Abaqa. His daughter Esukan was married to King David VII of Georgia. His other son was Bora. Armenian Prince Hasan Jalal offered him the hand of his daughter Ruzanna (Ruzukan). Bora was executed during reign of Hulagu.
