= Esukan =

13th-century Queen of Georgia

Queen consort of Georgia
- Tenure: 1263 – 1270
- Spouse: David VII (m. 1263)
- Father: Chormaqan

Esukan (Georgian: ესუქანი) (fl. 1241–1270) was a queen consort of Georgia as the fourth and last wife of King David VII Ulu.

== Biography ==
According to the anonymous 14th-century Chronicle of a Hundred Years, Esukan was a daughter of the Mongol general Chormaqan and sister of Shiramun Noyan. David VII married her in 1263, after Hulegu Khan put his previous wife, Gvantsa, to death in response to David's abortive rebellion against the Ilkhanate. A lavish wedding was celebrated in the royal capital of Tbilisi.

The marriage was childless and marred by a scandal in 1264, when Basil, a royal chancellor and bishop of Chqondidi and of Ujarma, was accused of adultery with Queen Esukan. David, habitually gullible and prone to hasty decisions, promptly had Basil executed by hanging in the middle of his capital. Modern scholars such as Ivane Javakhishvili doubt the truthfulness of these accusations, seeing in them a plot to remove Basil, the author of a controversial project of secularization of a part of the church's land holdings, from the political scene of Georgia.

The medieval annals give no information about the later years of the marital life of David and Esukan, but mention that, when David died (in 1270), rumors held Esukan responsible for poisoning her husband as a revenge for the death of Basil. The chronicler compares these rumors to those that had Alexander the Great murdered by Antipater.

== Notes ==
Royal titles
Preceded by Gvantsa Kakhaberidze	Queen consort of Georgia; 1263–1270	Succeeded by Theodora Megale Komnena
