= Korguz =

Uyghur governor of Khorasan under Mongol Empire

- ᠺᠥᠷᠭᠦᠽ

Darughachi of Khorasan
- In office 1236–1242
- Sahib-i divan: Baha al-Din Juvayni
- Preceded by: Jin Temür
- Succeeded by: Arghun Aqa
- Vizier: Sharaf al-Din Khwarazmi; Asil of Rughad

Personal details
- Born: Barlugh, Beshbalik, Qocho
- Died: 1242 Karakorum, Mongol Empire

Korguz (died 1242) or Körgüz was a Uyghur governor of Khurasan during the reign of the Mongol ruler Ögedei Khan.

== Biography ==
=== Early life ===
He was born in a village called Barlugh, about 4 parasangs away from Beshbalik in Xinjiang, China. He was an Uyghur and may have been a Nestorian Christian as Chinese rendering of his name - Kuolojisi (Chinese: 阔里吉思) - is usually a transcription of the Christian name George and his village had a church. However, according to Juvayni, he was a Buddhist. After losing his father at a young age, he requested to marry his step-mother as the custom of levirate dictated and approached Idiqut but later gave it up in return of a land plot from a person who wanted to marry her. He learnt the Uyghur script on his own but couldn't climb the social ladders as he was an orphan and wasn't related to anyone in power. Later, he set out to seek a job in Jochi's ordu while mortgaging his own cousin Besh Qulach for a horse.

=== Career ===
He started his career as a herdsman of a commander of Jochi. He suddenly rose to be bitikchi of Jochi as he stepped forward when the prince received an edict from Genghis Khan and nobody was around to read the document. He was later appointed to be a teacher for Jochi's children. He sent to represent interests of Jochi to Jin Temür, when he was appointed as the darughachi of Urgench in 1233. This newly established territory of Khorasan would later expand to include all Iran. Other bitikchis included Kül Bolad (representative of Ögedei), Nosal (representing Batu), Qizil Buqa (representing Chagatai), Yeke (representing Sorghaghtani Beki). His other partner was vizier Sharaf al-Din Khwarazmi, a Turk bitikchi. He was later sent as his representative to court of Ögedei Khan together with Baha al-Din Juvayni (father of Ata Malik and Shams al-Din Juvayni brothers). By the time envoys returned to Khorasan Jin Temür died.

A struggle began between Mongol princes over appointment of Jin Temür's successor in 1235/6. Main candidates for the position was Edgü Temür, Jin Temür's son and Körgüz. Temporary position was fulfilled by Batu's representative Nosal who was over 100 years old at this point, while Körgüz spent his time contacting different princes to achieve support. Körgüz was the eventual winner of the struggle as he gained support of Chinqai and Ögedei himself. As a proven administrator, he went on to reform fiscal matters in the region, carrying out census, while collaborating with Persian officials. The traditionalist group headed by Kül Bolat and Nosal. Körgüz's supporters included Baha al-Din Juvayni, local rulers like Nizam al-Din of Isfarayin, Ikhtiyar al-Din of Abivard, Amid al-Mulk Sharaf al-Din of Bistam and others.

Danishmend Hajib later initiated an official investigation into Körgüz, instigated by Edgü Temür. Investigation team included Mongol officials like Arghun Aqa, Shams al-Din Kamargar and Qurbaqa Elchi. Körgüz, who sent his own emissaries to Khan's court was apprehended in Fanakat by Edgü Temür's party and was beaten. Khan later sent Körgüz's envoy back and expressed his anger over Körgüz's beating, summoning all bitikchis to court. On their way, Kül Bolad was assassinated in Bukhara by Ismaili fida'iyis. Ögedei tried to reconcile rival sides, but later found Edgü Temür to be guilty.

Körgüz returned to his headquarters at Tus in November–December 1239 following the judgement. He started a development project, rebuilding the city, improving the infrastructure, strengthening the rule of law. He sent his own sons as tax collectors to lands newly conquered by Chormaqan, who disputed his authority.

=== Downfall ===
After demoting his former partner Sharaf al-Din and giving his vizierate to a coppersmith called Asil, he received ire of traditionalist group in the court. He received news of death of Ögedei on his way to Karakorum. He quarreled with one of Chagatai's emirs on his way to kurultai. As a result, new regent Töregene Khatun who was supported by Chagataid princes, gave a new edict to arrest Körgüz. Although Körgüz barricaded himself in Tus, he nevertheless opened the gates, declaring that he is no rebel. He was arrested by his former enemy Nosal's son Tubadai and sent to Chagatai court. The court sent his case to Töregene. Meanwhile, Körgüz's former supporters like Chinqai fled upon accession of Töregene so there were no one left to protect him. Eventually Töregene turned him over to Qara Hülegü at the suggestion of Fatima, herself a protector of Sharaf al-Din. He directed that stones be stuffed into his mouth in public until Korguz fatally choked. He was succeeded by his former deputy Arghun Aqa. According to Juvayni, Korguz was converted to Islam towards the end of his life.

== See also ==
- Society of the Mongol Empire

== Sources ==
- Juvayni, Ata Malik (1958). The History of the World-Conqueror. Translated by Boyle, John Andrew. Harvard University Press.
