= Lagurka =

Church building in Mestia Municipality, Georgia

- ლაგურკა
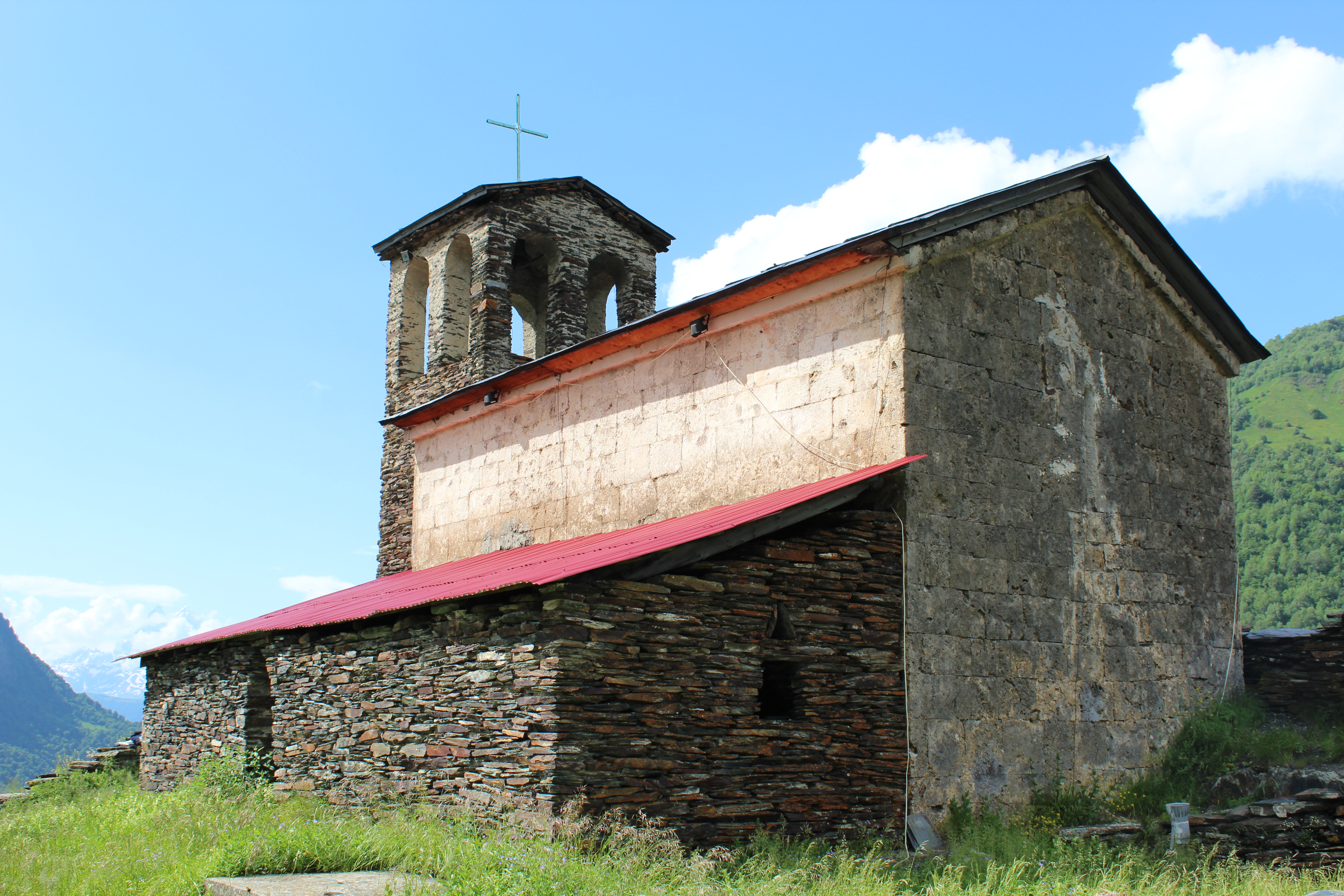
- Lagurka
- Interactive map of Lagurka
- Location: Khe, Mestia Municipality, Samegrelo-Zemo Svaneti, Georgia
- Coordinates: 42.938611°N 42.906667°E
- Type: Hall church

The Kala church of Saints Cyricus and Julitta (Georgian: კალას წმინდა კვირიკესა და ივლიტას სახელობის ეკლესია, romanized: k'alas ts'minda k'virik'esa da ivlit'as sakhelobis ek'lesia), locally known as Lagurka (ლაგურკა), is a medieval church in the Mestia Municipality in Georgia's region of Samegrelo-Zemo Svaneti. The area is part of the highland historical and cultural region of Upper Svaneti where Lagurka is regarded as the principal Christian shrine, its designation deriving from the name of Cyricus in the local Svan language. It is a hall church, adorned with frescoes painted by Tevdore in 1111/1112, one of the high points of medieval Georgian monumental art. The church is inscribed on the list of the Immovable Cultural Monuments of National Significance of Georgia.

== History ==
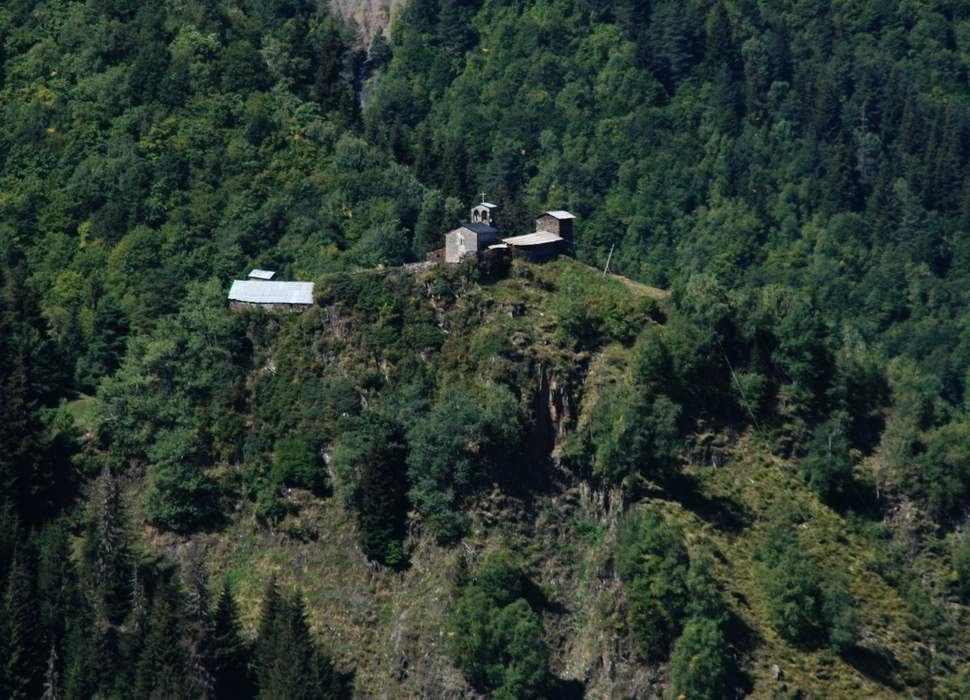
Lagurka

Lagurka is nested on a high hill above the village of Khe in the Kala territorial unit, Mestia Municipality, on the left bank of the upper Enguri River, at about 2200 metres above sea level. The church is dedicated to the early Christian martyrs Cyricus and Julitta, who are venerated as the patron saints of the Kala community. Lagurka itself is considered to be the holiest shrine by the Svans, their most binding oath being on the icons preserved at the church. The church hosts an annual all-Svan festival and pilgrimage, kvirikoba ("the day of Cyricus"), held annually on July 28. In the words of the historian Ekvtime Taqaishvili, for the Svans Lagurka is what Delphi was for the ancient Greeks—the symbol of their unity.

== Layout ==
The exact date when Lagurka was constructed is not known. Judging by its style, the extant church is dated to sometime between the late 10th or early 12th centuries. Lagurka, measuring 5 x 2.70 m, is built of yellowish limestone blocks. It is a hall church, with annexes built at a later date on the south and north. To the west attached is a two-storey bell-tower which also serves as the narthex. Originally the church had three entrances, on the south, north, and west. The building can now be accessed only through a doorway cut in the south annex. The building was enveloped by a high toothed stone wall, which now stands in ruins. Other buildings such as refectory and cells are built down on the mountains slope. In the interior of the church, a semicircular apse is separated from the nave by a stone tripartite iconostasis. Its barrel vault rests upon a single supporting arch. The longitudinal walls are each sectioned by a pair of arched pilasters. The church is lit with two windows, cut one each in the apse and west wall; daylight through them is directly shed on the extensively frescoed west and east walls.

=== Frescoes ===
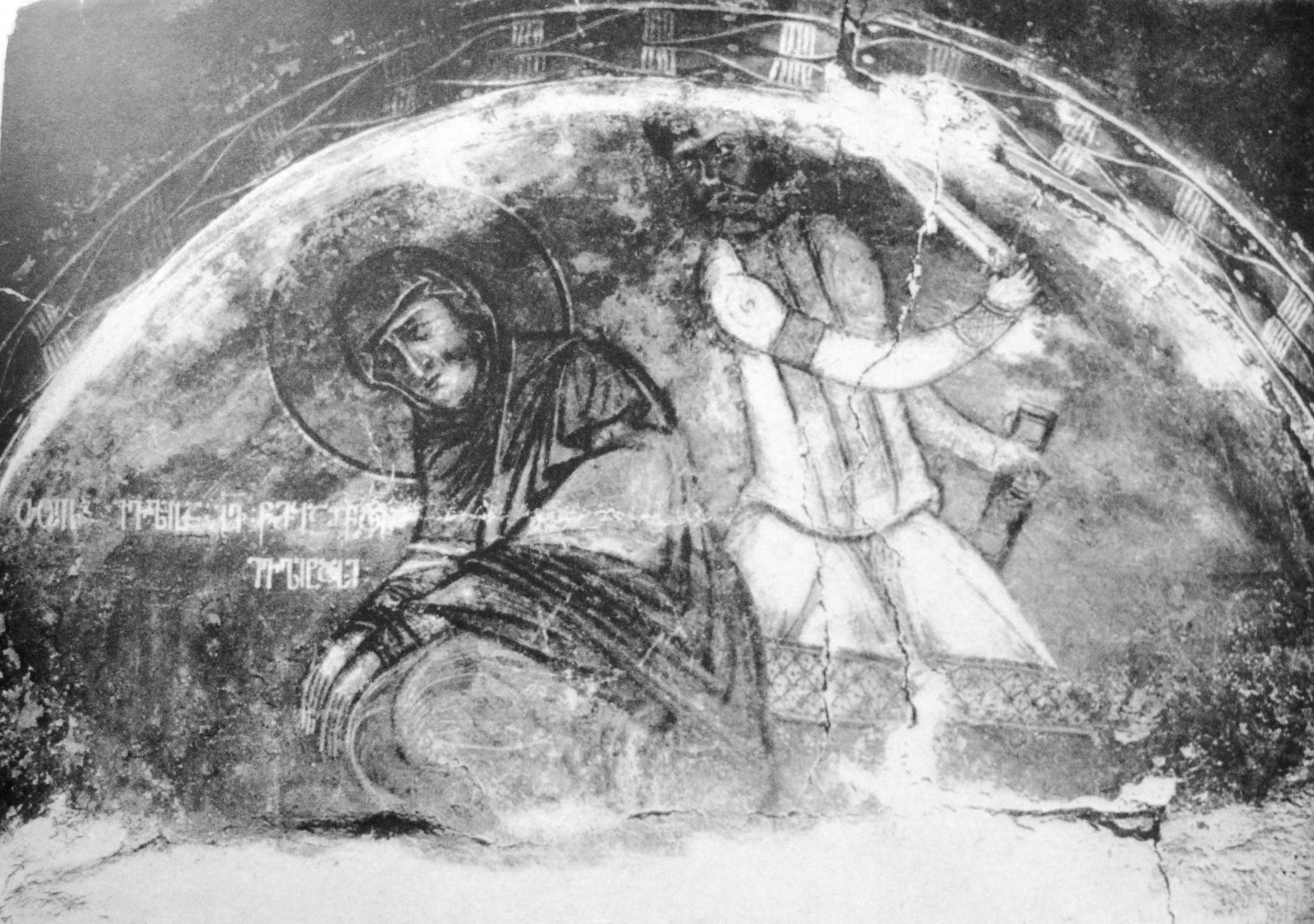
Martyrdom of St. Julitta. A fresco from Lagurka.

The church is completely frescoed, with numerous explanatory inscriptions in Georgian. Some of them have faded away. One partially damaged inscription, that on the west wall, dates the paintings to 1111 or 1112. It names the donors—the aznauri of the Kala community—and mentions a painter whose name is reconstructed—through the analogy with the two Svan churches of Iprari and Nakipari—as Tevdore. The paintings in the conch and iconostasis, damaged by an earthquake, were restored at a later date by the certain Giorgi, son of Anton, as revealed in an inscription on the south pilaster. The sanctuary conch is adorned with the Deesis, where Christ holds a scroll with a text from John 8:12: "I am the light of the world. Whoever follows me will not walk in darkness". There are four more Christological scenes: the Nativity, Crucifixion, Baptism, and the Resurrection on the south and north walls. The iconographic program also includes depictions of several saints such as Barbara, Catherine, Stephen, Christina, George, and Theodore, and two scenes of the martyrdom of the church's titular saints—Cyricus and Julitta. The paintings are noted for their emotional expressiveness and carefully conceived positioning. The distribution of the frescoes follows the architectural sectioning of the interior and suggests a symbolic relationship between various scenes and images.

Lagurka contains a rich of collection of various church items from different periods of time. These include manuscripts, crosses, icons, and utensils, both locally produced and brought from elsewhere in Georgia or abroad. Highly venerated is the so-called Shaliani icon, a Byzantine repoussé icon of the Crucifixion.
