= Gvantsa Kakhaberidze =

13th-century Queen of Georgia

Queen consort of Georgia
- Tenure: 1252 – 1263
- Died: c. 1263
- Spouse: Avag Zakarian (died 1250) David VII (m. 1252)
- Issue: First Marriage; Khoshak Zakarian; Second Marriage; Demetrius II of Georgia
- House: Kakhaberidze (by birth); Zakarid dynasty (by I.marriage); Bagrationi dynasty (by II.marriage)
- Father: Kakhaber IV Kakhaberidze

Gvantsa (Georgian: გვანცა, or, archaically, Guantsa, გუანცა; also transliterated as Gwantza) (died c. 1263) was a queen consort of Georgia as the third wife of King David VII Ulu (r. 1245–1270).

== Biography ==
She was the daughter of Kakhaber IV Kakhaberidze, Duke of Racha and Takveri, who married Gvantsa off to Prince Avag Mkhargrdzeli, Lord High Tutor and Lord High Constable of Georgia with whom she begot a daughter Khvashak. After Avag’s death in 1250, Gvantsa remarried the Georgian king David VII in 1252 and gave birth to a son, the future king Demetrius II of Georgia, in 1259. In the meantime, Khvashak was reared by the king’s trustee Sumbat Orbeli or Sadun of Mankaberdi (here the medieval sources diverge) and later given in marriage to Shams al-Din Juvayni, an influential minister at the Mongol Il-Khan’s court.

Unlike David VII's first wife, the late Jigda-Khatun, Gvantsa was on extremely bad terms with the influential royal favorite Jikur, the Master of Ceremonies (mestumre) of Georgia. Jikur's rivals exploited this enmity and accused him of treason before the king who had him executed by drowning in the Mtkvari River. When David staged a failed revolt from the Il-Khan hegemony in 1260, Gvantsa was captured by the Mongol punitive forces and killed on the orders of the Il-Khan Hulagu through the intrigues of rival Georgian nobles.

Royal titles
Preceded by Jigda-Khatun	Queen consort of Georgia; 1252 - 1262	Succeeded by Esukan
