= David VII =

King of Georgia from 1246 to 1270

David VII დავით VII
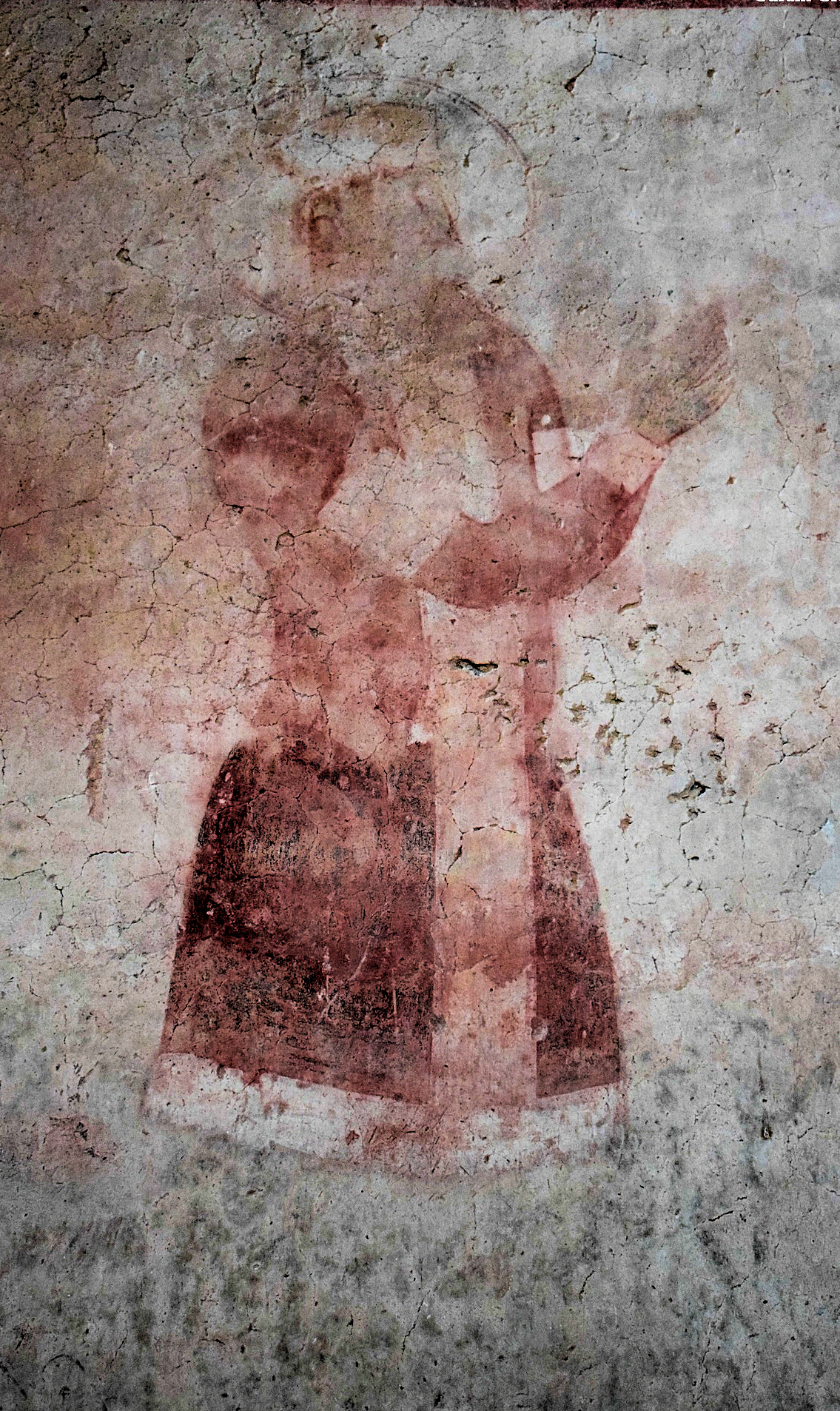
- Mural of David VII from the St. Shio's Marani Monastery, near Telavi, Kakheti.

King of Georgia
- Reign: 1245–1270
- Coronation: 1245 at Svetitskhoveli Cathedral
- Predecessor: Rusudan
- Successor: Demetrius II
- Co-king: David VI (until 1259)
- Born: 1215
- Died: 1270 (aged 54–55); Tbilisi
- Burial: Svetitskhoveli Cathedral, Mtskheta
- Spouse: Jigda-Khatun (died 1252) Altun (sep. 1252) Gvantsa Kakhaberidze (died 1262) Esukan (m. 1263)
- Issue: Prince George; Princess Tamar; Demetrius II of Georgia
Names
- David VII the Elder; Davit VII Ulu
- Dynasty: Bagrationi
- Father: George IV of Georgia
- Mother: Velistsikhian Aznauri's daughter
- Religion: Georgian Orthodox Church

David VII, also known as David Ulu (Georgian: დავით VII ულუ, "David the Senior" in the Mongol language) (1215–1270), from the Bagrationi dynasty, was king (mepe) of Georgia from 1245 to 1270. He first ruled Georgia jointly with his namesake cousin, David VI, from 1246 to 1259. From 1259, David VI, revolting from the Mongol hegemony, seceded in the western half of the kingdom and formed the Kingdom of Western Georgia, while David VII was left to rule a reduced Kingdom of Georgia (1256–1329) in the region of eastern Georgia under Mongol control.

== Early life ==
David was the morganatic son of the Georgian King George IV and a woman of non-noble origin. Because of this, he was considered an illegitimate son in the circles of the Georgian nobility, so his father was succeeded by his sister Rusudan upon his death in 1223. Since Georgia became a Mongol vassal in 1236 and no longer depended so much on the will of the local nobility, Rusudan, fearing that he would want to ascend the throne, sent him into captivity at the court of her son-in-law, Sultan Kaykhusraw II. Then in 1243 she sent her son, also David, to the court of the great khan in Karakorum, so that he could be recognized as the heir apparent to the Kingdom of Georgia.

== Reign ==
=== Diarchy ===
After the Battle of Köse Dağ in 1243, which subdued the Sultanate of Rum to the Mongols, Kaykhusraw was forced to release David Ulu. Rusudan died in 1245, still waiting for her son's return from the Mongolian court. A part of the Georgian nobility, thinking that David the son of Rusudan had died, proclaimed David Ulu as the king of Georgia. In 1246 the two Davids (the future David VI, who had been in Mongolia since 1243, and the recently proclaimed David VII Ulu) attended the enthronement of Guyuk Khan at the Mongol court in Karakorum, Mongolia, together with a large number of foreign ambassadors: the Franciscan friar and envoy of Pope Innocent IV, John of Plano Carpini and Benedict of Poland; Grand Duke Yaroslav II of Vladimir; the brother of the king of Armenia and historian, Sempad the Constable; the future Seljuk Sultan of Rum, Kilij Arslan IV; and ambassadors of the Abbasid Caliph Al-Musta'sim and Ala ud din Masud of the Delhi Sultanate. all bearing homage, tribute, and presents. The 13th-century historian Juvayni said:

From Khitai there came emirs and officials; and from Transoxiana and Turkestan the emir Masʿud accompanied by grandees of that region. With the emir Arghun there came the celebrities and notables of Khorasan, Iraq, Lur, Azerbaijan and Shirvan. From Rum came Sultan Rukn al-Din and the Sultan of Takavor (Trebizond); from Georgia, the two Davits; from Aleppo, the brother of the Lord of Aleppo; from Mosul, the envoy of Sultan Badr al-Din Luʾluʾ; and from the city of Peace, Baghdad, the chief qadi Fakhr al-Din. There also came the Sultan of Erzurum, envoys from the Franks, and from Kerman and Fars also; and from ʿAla al-Din of Alamut, his governors in Quhistan, Shihab al-Din and Shams al-Din. And all this great assembly came with such baggage as befitted a court; and there came also from other directions so many envoys and messengers that two thousand felt tents had been made ready for them: there came also merchants with the rare and precious things that are produced in the East and the West.

— Juvayni, 1: 249–50.

In order to control the country more easily, due to the apparent succession crisis, although the majority of the nobility did not side with the illegitimate son, the Mongols divided the Georgian nobles into two rival parties, each representing its own candidate for the crown. But there were also conflicts among the Mongols themselves, whereby David Ulu was supported by Baiju Noyan, the general and commander of Persia, and his contemporary brother Batu Khan, Khan of the Golden Horde. The Mongols appointed David VII as ulu ("senior") ruler, while David VI was appointed as narin (junior) ruler.

=== Decline of the kingdom ===
In the following years, both David Ulu and David Narin showed unwavering loyalty to the Mongols even after the change at the head of the Mongol Empire and the coming to power of the great Khan Mongke in 1251. Georgia then came under the supreme rule of Batu Khan, who was given virtually independent rule over the western parts of the Mongol Empire by Mongke. Having embarked on an expedition to the Middle East in 1253, Mongke's brother Hulegu Khan was particularly keen to exploit the political and religious divisions of that part of the world. Attacking mostly Muslims, he tried to maintain the best possible relations with Georgians and Armenians. Numerous Georgian-Armenian military units participated in the Mongol conquest of Alamut in 1256, where they were personally led by David Ulu, and of Baghdad in 1258, and in the skirmishes between Mongol leaders during the campaign.

=== Later life ===
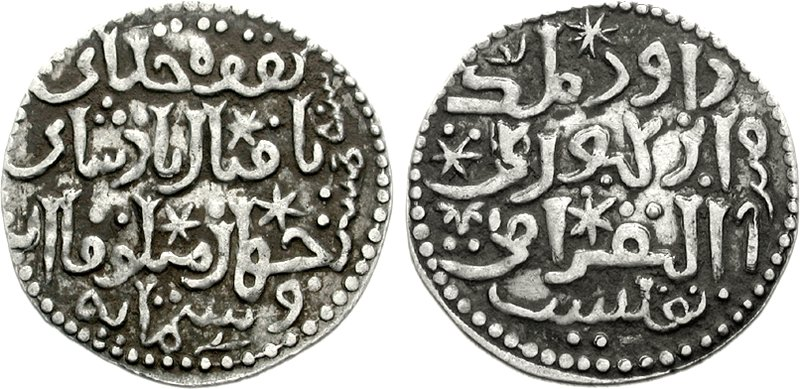
Tiflis coinage in the name of David VII citing Möngke as overlord, Persian, dated 1253.

Georgia lost tens of thousands of soldiers in these campaigns, and was left without native defenders against the Mongol forces sent to suppress spontaneous rebellions that broke out due to high taxes and the heavy burden of military service. The country suffered heavily from the consequences of rebellions against the Mongol authorities, and even more devastating than the Mongol punitive expeditions were the internal conflicts between currents loyal and disloyal to the Mongols. In 1259, Georgian nobles led by David Narin rose up against the Mongols, separating the Kingdom of Western Georgia from the unified Georgia.

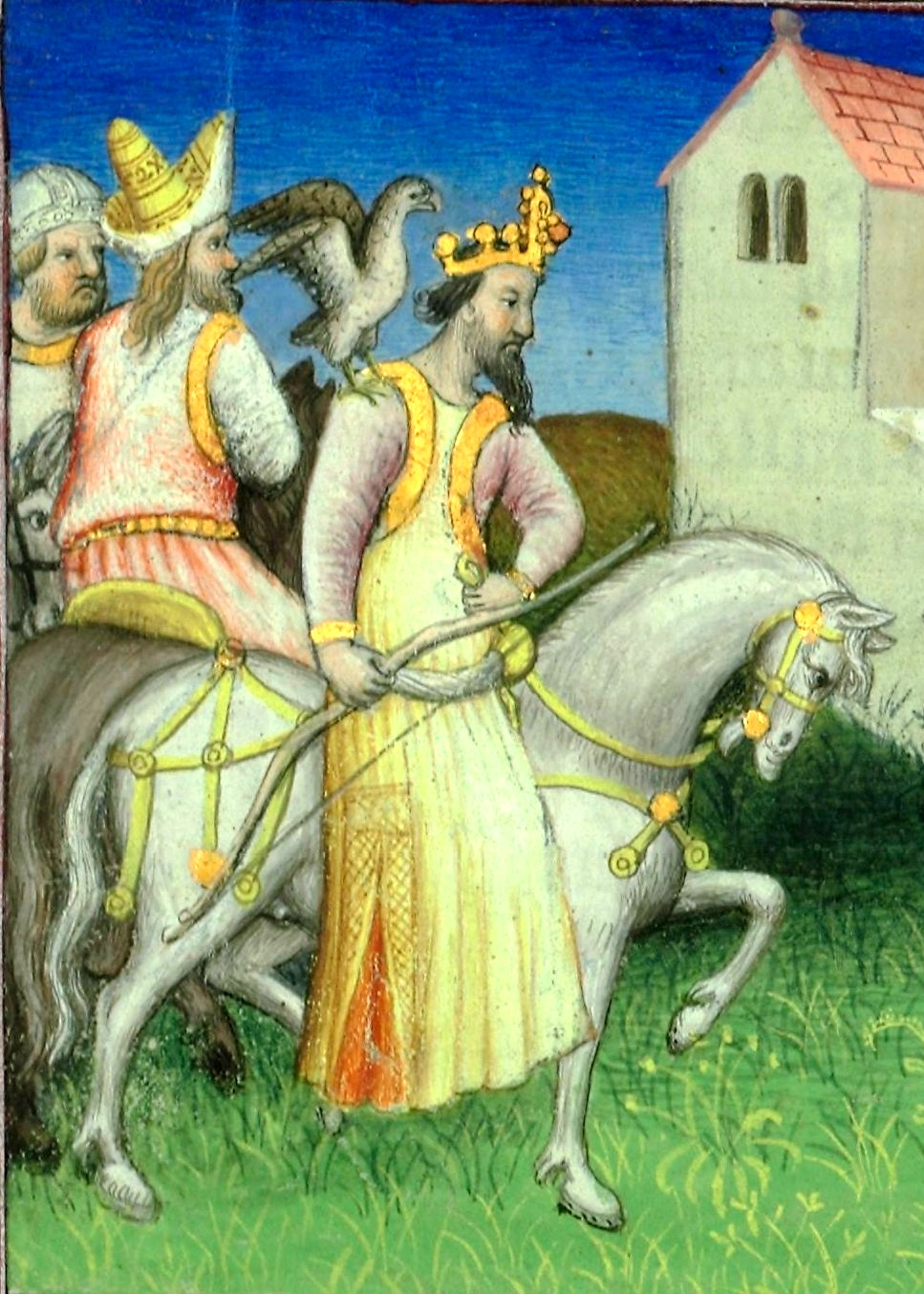
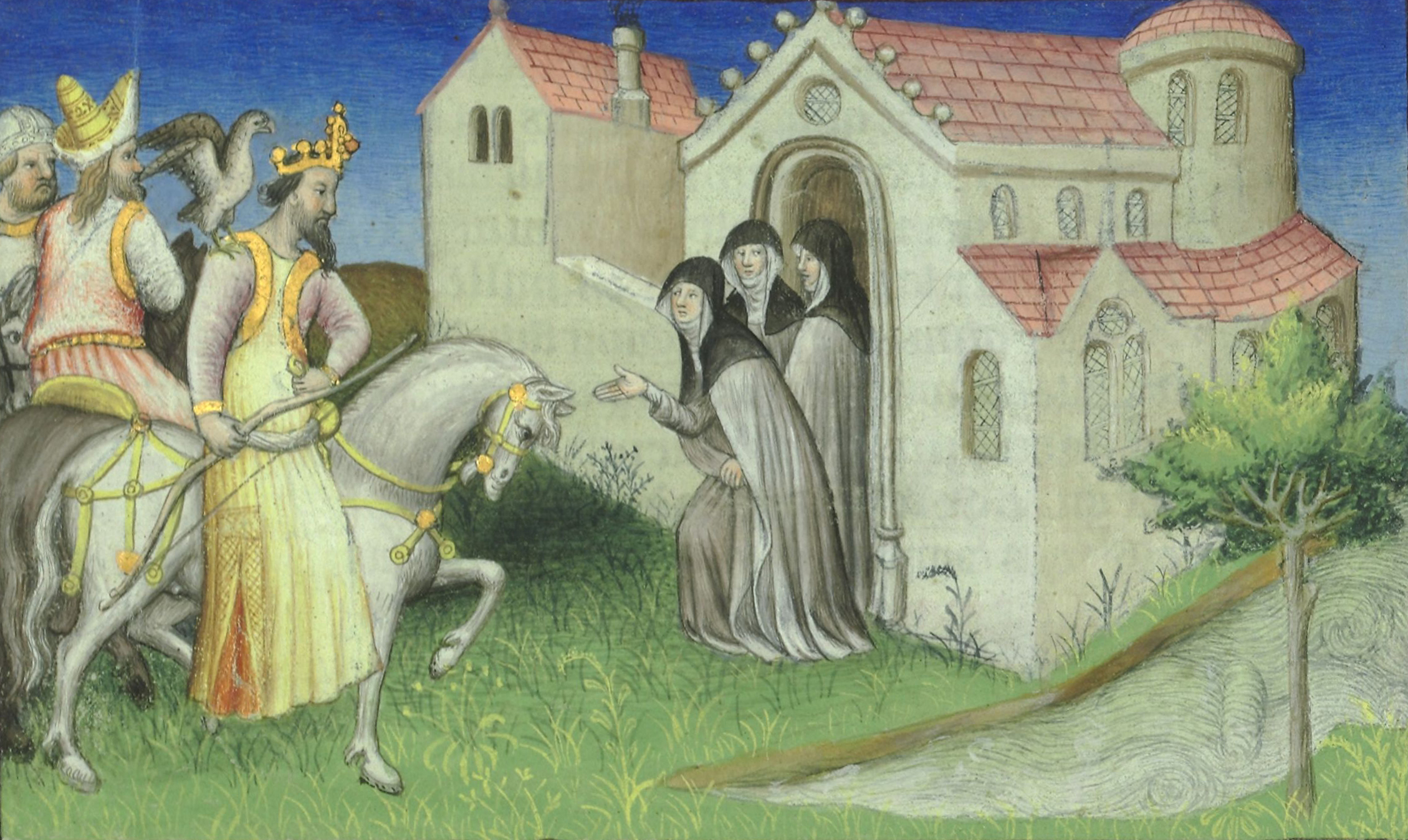
David VII on a hunt. A miniature from Marco Polo's Livre des merveilles, c. 1410

When in 1260 Hulegu Khan requested the presence of Georgians and Armenians as part of the Mongol units in the Levant, remembering the losses of his troops in the 1258 Siege of Baghdad, David Ulu rebelled. A large Mongol army led by General Arghun Aqa invaded Georgia from the south, inflicted a heavy defeat on David and Sargis I Jaqeli in a battle near Akhaldaba, and then brutally plundered the country. The Mongol campaign continued during the winter, and the following year the king was forced to flee to Imereti, which the Mongols failed to conquer. David's family was captured, and his wife Gvantsa was killed. Peace with the Mongols was achieved in 1262, when David Ulu returned to Tbilisi to reclaim his crown as a Mongol vassal, pledging allegiance to Hulegu, while David Narin only nominally recognized Mongol rule in Imereti. The reason for Hulegu's tolerance towards the rebel lies in the fact that since 1261, the Il-kan was at war with the Golden Horde, which was on a larger scale.

The territory of the Caucasus, and as part of it the Kingdom of Georgia itself, became the scene of war between Hulegu and the Khan of the Golden Horde Berke in the following years. David Ulu provided his support for the conflict between the Il-Khanate and the Golden Horde in 1263-1265. In 1263, King David's troops participated in the defense of the Siba fortress against the Golden Horde. In 1265, his troops, as the vanguard of the Ilkhanate army, defeated Berke and pushed his troops out of Shirvan. As Hulegu died in the same year, Berke began to prepare a major offensive. The following year, his army penetrated into Georgia, but the offensive was abruptly stopped due to the death of the khan in the vicinity of Tbilisi. However, Georgia's troubles continued, but now with the Ilkhanate. The nobles were encouraged to rise up against the crown, which naturally facilitated Mongol control over the country. In the same year, 1266, Sargis Jaqeli, prince of Samtkhe, who ruled city of Akhaltsikhe, received special protection and patronage from the new ilkhan of Abaqa Khan. In this way, Sargis was elevated to the rank of David and Georgia was torn into three entities.

In 1270, David Ulu led Georgian and Armenian troops in support of the Mongol Abaqa against Tekuder, who had found refuge in Western Georgia.

David VII Ulu died of a bowel infection at the age of 55 in the spring of 1270. He was buried at Mtskheta. He was succeeded by his son Demetre II.

== Family ==
David VII was married four times: first to Jigda-Khatun, a Mongolian; second to Altun, an Alanian; third to Gvantsa, daughter of Kakhaber Kakhaberidze, Duke of Racha; and fourth to Esukan, daughter of the Mongol general Chormaqan. His children were:

- Prince George (died 1268), by Altun;
- Princess Tamar, by Altun, who was married firstly to a son of Arghun-Agha and secondly to Sadun Mankaberdeli;
- Demetrius II of Georgia (1259–1289), by Gvantsa, who succeeded his father as King of Georgia and reigned from 1270 until his execution by the Mongol Ilkhans in 1289.

== Bibliography ==
- Bai︠a︡rsaĭkhan, D. (2011). The Mongols and the Armenians (1220-1335). Leiden; Boston: Brill. ISBN 978-9-0041-8635-4.
- Uzelac, Aleksandar (2015). Under the shadow of a dog; Tatars and South Slavic countries in the second half of the 13th century. Belgrade.
- Toumanoff, Cyrille (1976). Manuel de Généalogie et de Chronologie pour l'histoire de la Caucasie chrétienne (Arménie, Géorgie, Albanie) [Manual of Genealogy and Chronology of Christian Caucasian History (Armenia, Georgia, Albania)] (in French). Rome: Edizioni Aquila.
- Metreveli, Roin, ed. (2008). "„ასწლოვანი მატიანე"" [Chronicle of A Hundred Years] ( (PDF)). ქართლის ცხოვრება [Kartlis Tskhovreba] (in Georgian). Tbilisi: Artanuji. Archived from the original on 2012-04-01.
- Howorth, Henry H. (1888). History of the Mongols from the 9th to the 19th century. Part III. London: Longmans, Green, And Co.

Preceded by David VI Narin	King of Georgia; 1246–1270; With: David VI Narin	Succeeded by Demetre II
