= Deesis =

Artistic theme featuring Jesus

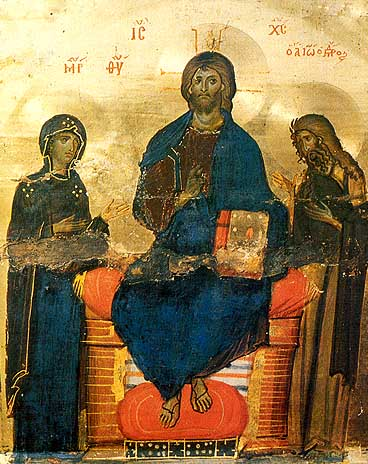
Icon of the Deesis – St. Catherine's Monastery Sinai, 12th century

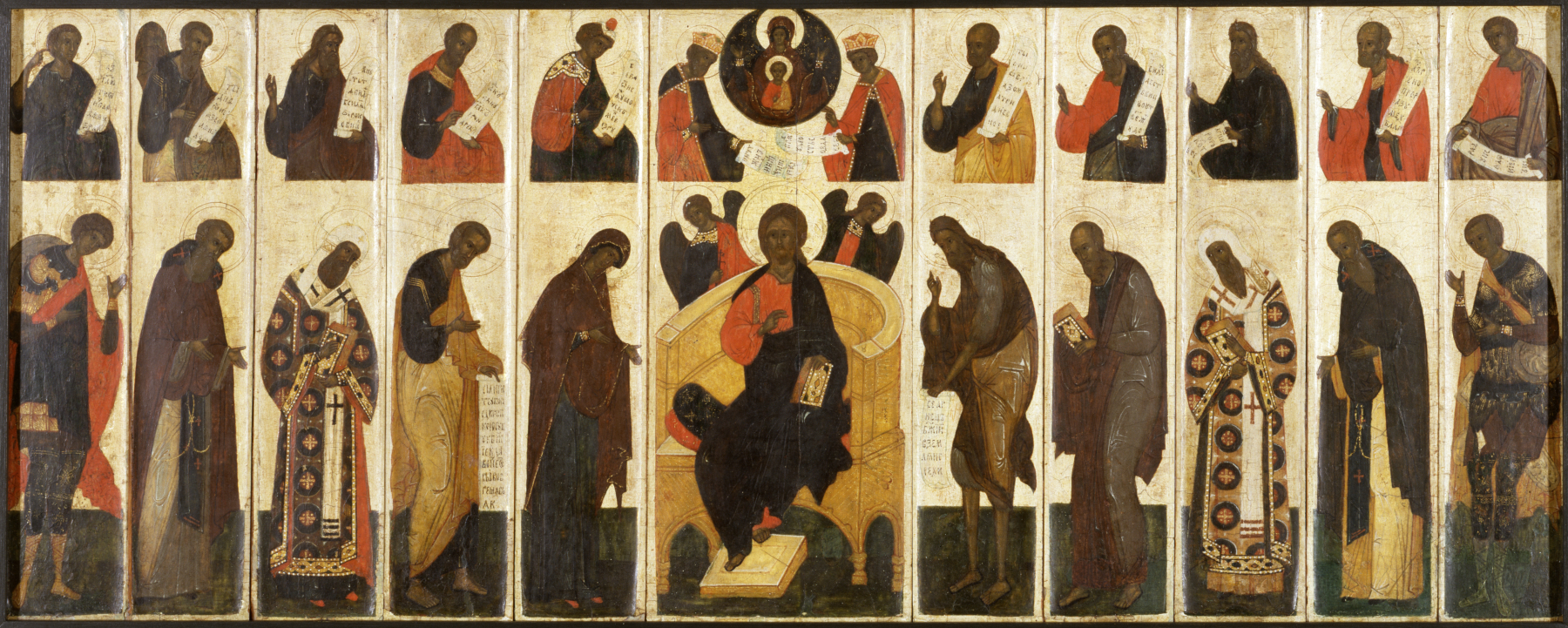
Great Deesis with Prophets; 16th century; Walters Art Museum

In Byzantine art, and in later Eastern Orthodox iconography generally, the Deësis or Deisis (/deɪˈiːsɪs/, day-EE-siss; Greek: δέησις, "prayer" or "supplication") is a traditional iconic representation of Christ in Majesty or Christ Pantocrator: enthroned, carrying a book, and flanked by the Virgin Mary and St. John the Baptist, and sometimes other saints and angels. Mary and John, and any other figures, are shown facing towards Christ with their hands raised in supplication on behalf of humanity.

Early examples often appeared on the templon beam in Orthodox churches or above doors, though icons and devotional ivories also feature the Deesis.

After the development of the full iconostasis screen there was room for a larger "Deesis row" or "Great Deesis" of full-length figures, and the number of figures expanded, both in Byzantium and in Russia. Usually this row is above the level of the doors, and usually below (sometimes above) the row depicting the Twelve Great Feasts. The central Christ is therefore above the main door in the screen. Soon seven figures, usually one to a panel, became standard, in order of proximity to Christ in the centre: on the left (Christ's right) Mary, the Archangel Michael and Saint Peter, and on the right John the Baptist, the Archangel Gabriel and Saint Paul. Especially in Russian examples, a number of saints of local significance are often included behind these, as space allows. Andrei Rublev's row for the Cathedral of the Dormition in Vladimir was 3.14 metres (over ten feet) high. In the Greek tradition the Apostles are more likely to occupy extra panels.

The presence of Mary and John, and other figures, provides one of the differences with the Western Christ in Majesty, where the Four Evangelists and/or their symbols are more commonly included around Christ. The Deesis composition is also commonly found in the West, especially in those parts of Italy which came under Byzantine influence, but also in the rest of Europe. It often forms part of a scene of the Last Judgement. The use of the image declined slowly throughout the Middle Ages, and it is never as common as the Western forms of Christ in Majesty.

In depictions of the Crucifixion of Jesus, Christ on the cross is also very often flanked by the Virgin standing on one side and by Saint John the Evangelist on the other, rather than John the Baptist.

== Gallery ==
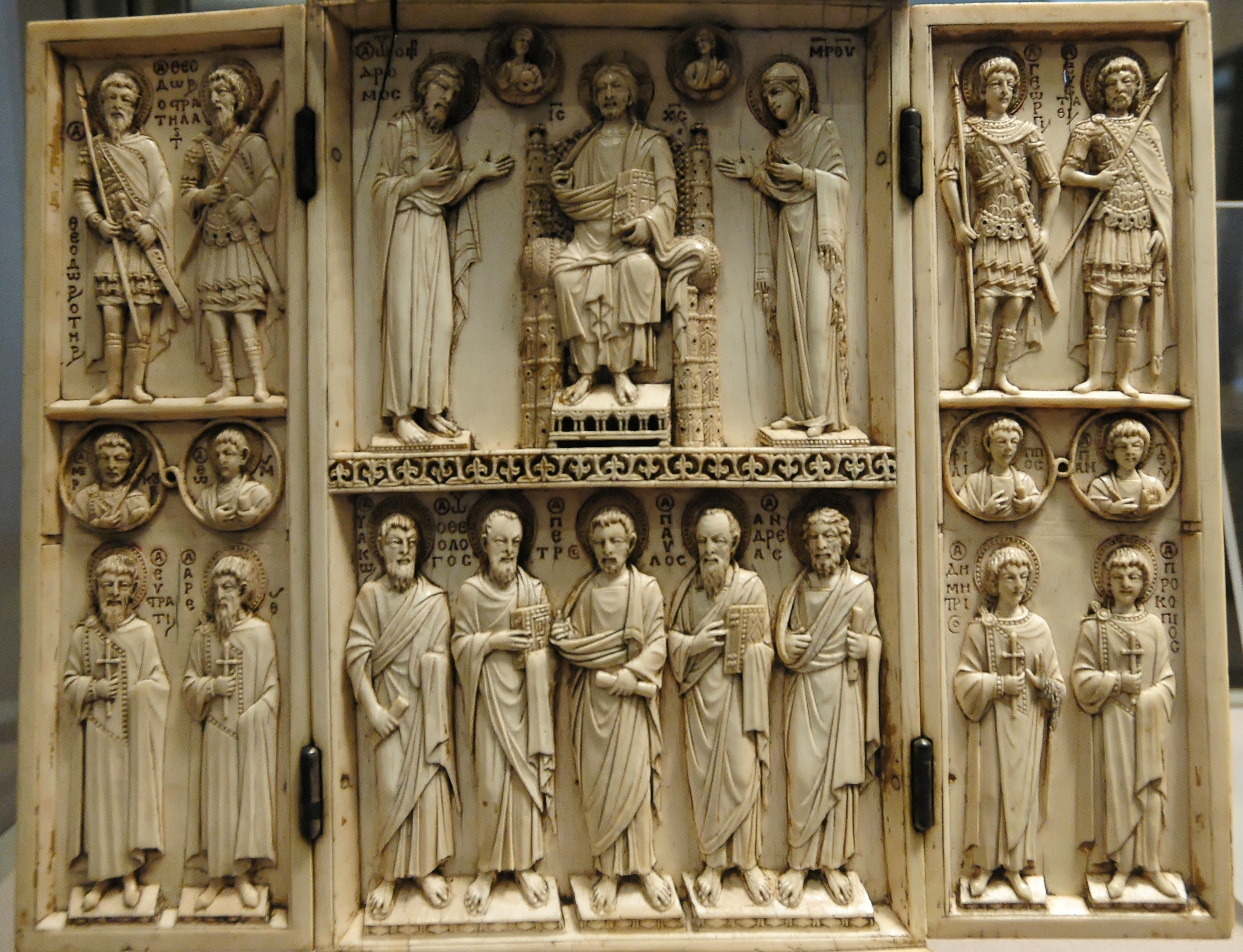
Harbaville Triptych, middle of the 10th century, ivory, Constantinople, Louvre

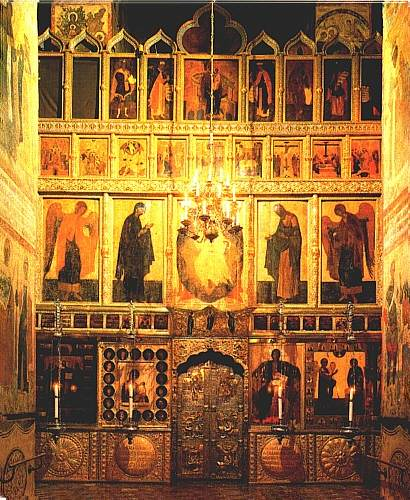
Five-panel Deesis row (center), Iconostasis in the Cathedral of the Annunciation in Moscow Kremlin by Theophanes the Greek, 1405 – the first five-row Iconostasis

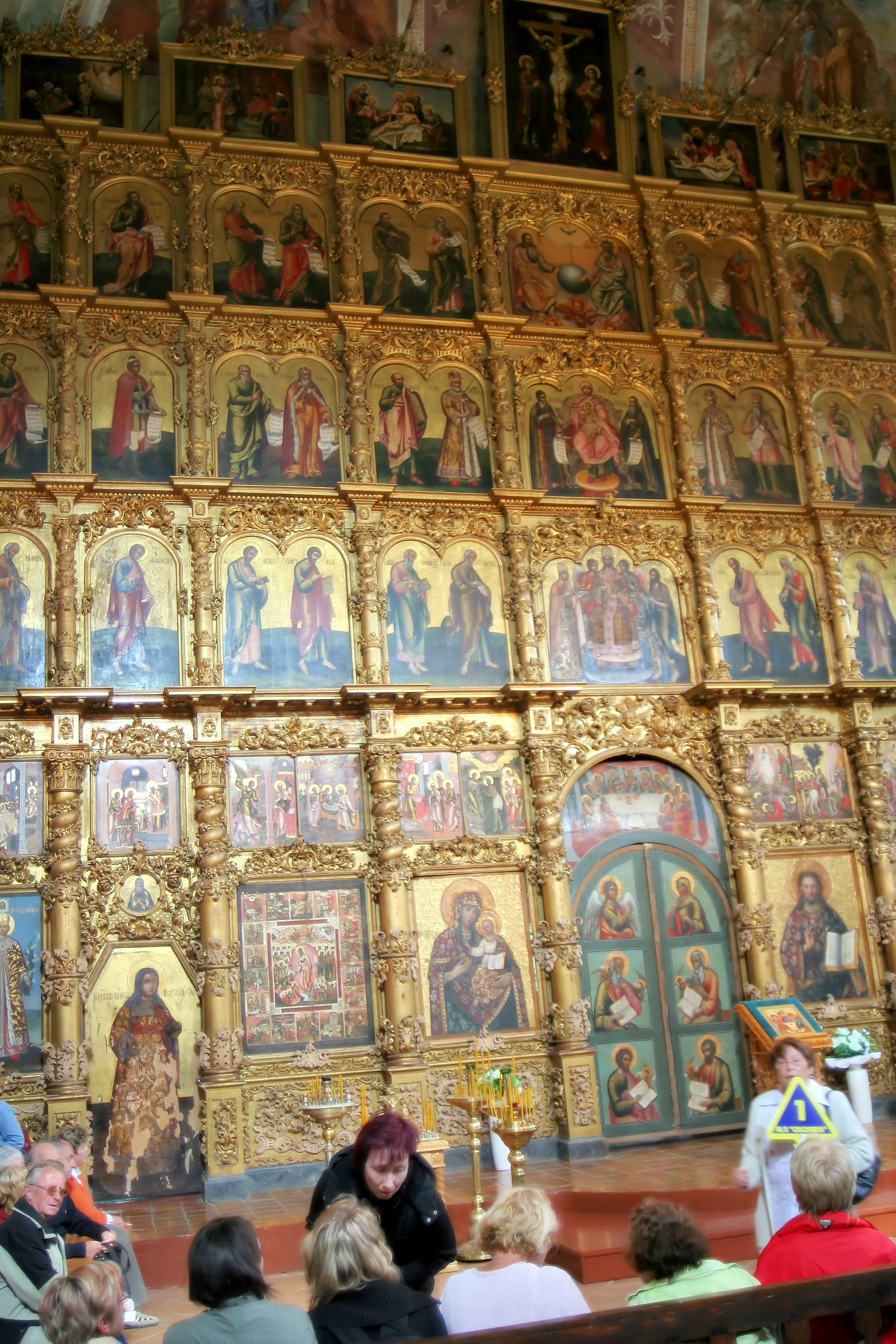
A larger Russian Deesis row; Uglich Cathedral

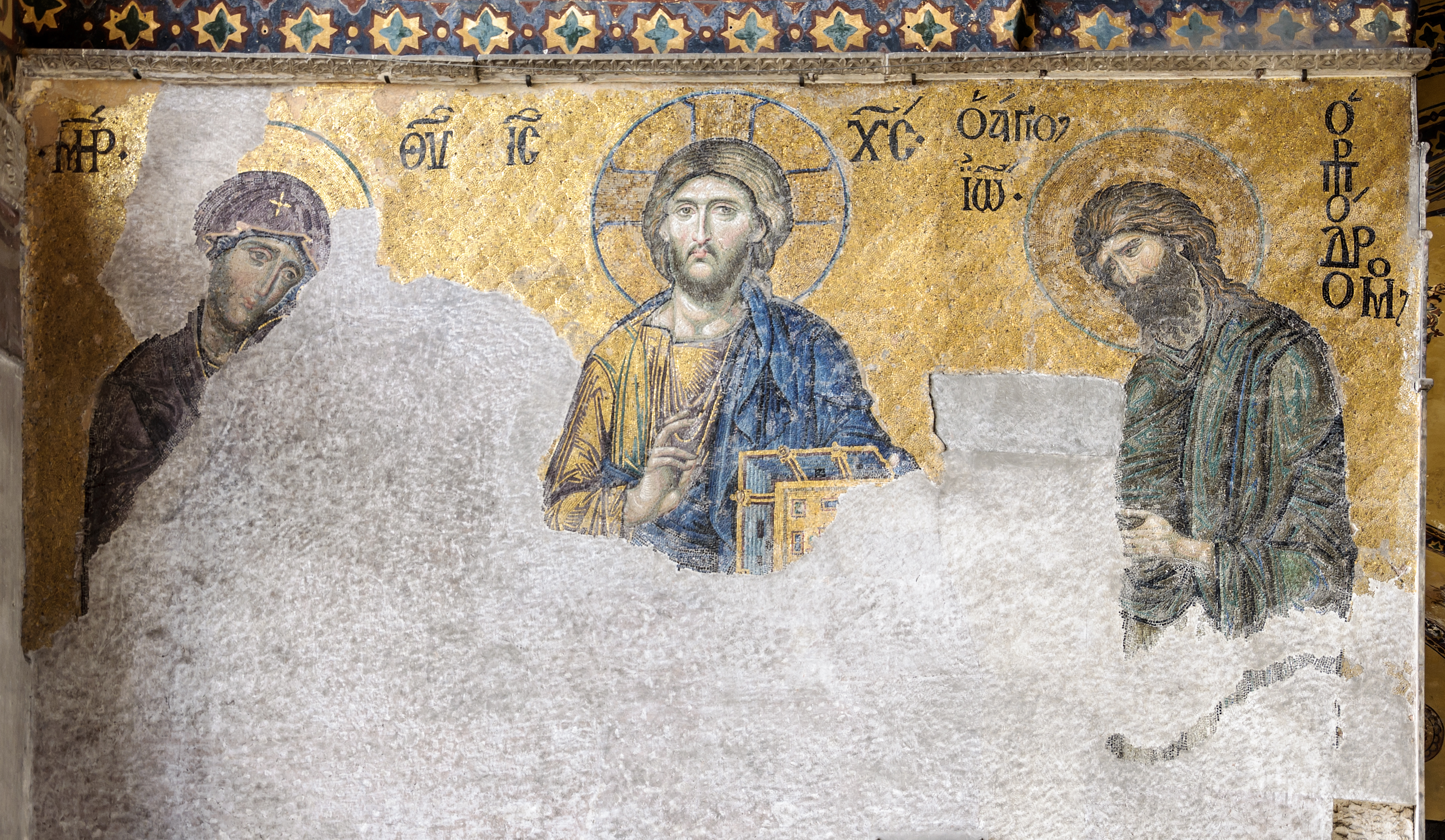
Mosaic of the Deesis, 13th century, Hagia Sophia

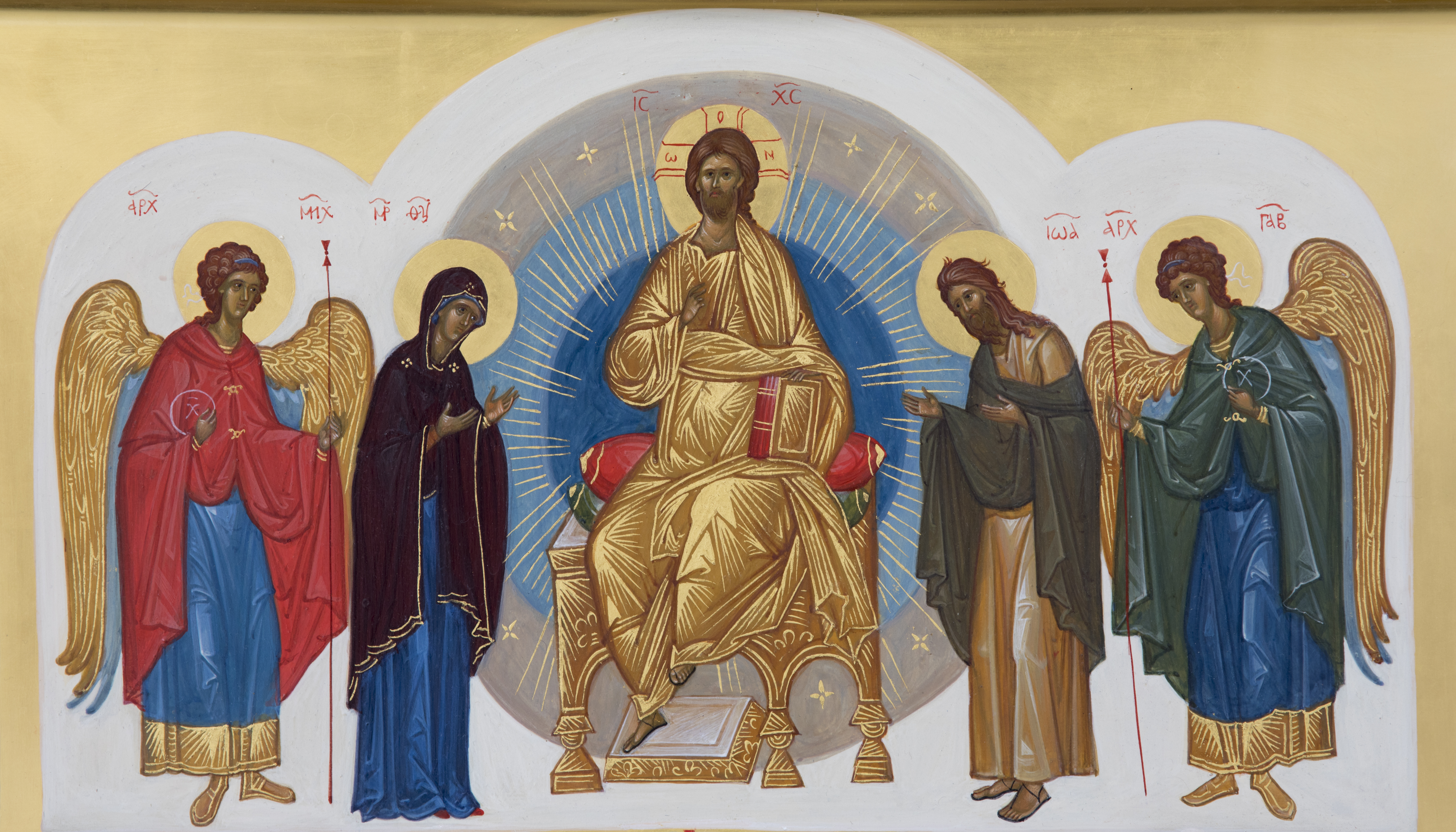
21st-century Deesis, including Archangels Michael and Gabriel; part of a larger icon in the Russian Orthodox Church of the Resurrection in Zurich, Switzerland
