= Muhammad ibn Hendushah Nakhjavani =

Medieval scholar

Muhammad ibn Hendushah Nakhjavani (also spelled Nakhjivani; b. c. 1287 – c. 1290, d. after 1366), also known as Šams-i Munšī, was a 14th-century author of several works written in Persian. He is often mistaken for his father Hindushah, who notably wrote the historical chronicle Tajarib al-Salaf, a translation and modification of the Kitab al-fakhri, originally written in Arabic by Ibn al-Tiqtaqa (died 1310).

== Life ==
The life of Nakhjavani is obscure. He was son of Hendushah ibn Sanjar Girani (or Kirani)—the name Sanjar possibly indicating Turkic descent, while the nisba Nakhjavani suggests a link to the city of Nakhjavan in eastern Transcaucasia. Nakhjavani is known to have written a Persian glossary named Sihah al-Furs for his superior, the Persian statesman Ghiyath al-Din Muhammad, the son of the distinguished Ilkhanate vizier Rashid al-Din Hamadani (died 1318). He may have also written another Persian glossary with interlinear clarifications mentioned in Turkic.

With the guidance of Ghiyath al-Din Muhammad, Nakhjavani started writing the administrative manual of Dastur al-Katib fi Ta'yin al-Maratib, which he completed on 19 May 1360. Initially written for the last Ilkhanate ruler Abu Sa'id Bahadur Khan (r. 1316–1335), it was dedicated to the Jalayirid ruler of Arabian Iraq and Azerbaijan, Shaykh Uways Jalayir (r. 1356–1374). Regardless, Nakhjavani commends both rulers in the work, and portrays Shaykh Uways as the legitimate successor to the Ilkhanate. Similar attempts to connect the Jalayirids with the Ilkhanate were also made by other Jalayirid dignitaries, such as the historian Abu Bakr al-Qutbi al-Ahri, and the poets Salman Savaji (died 1376) and Nur al-Din Azhdari.

The Dastur al-katib contains valuable information about the administration of the Ilkhanate realm, as well as the political ideology of the Jalayirids. One of the titles that Nakhjavani refers Shaykh Uways by in his work is notably the Persian royal title of shahanshah (King of Kings). He also makes several mentions of the concept of Iran as a political entity.

== Sources ==
- Bosworth, C.E (1993). "Muḥammad b. Hindū-S̲h̲āh". In Bosworth, C. E.; van Donzel, E.; Heinrichs, W. P. & Pellat, Ch. (eds.). The Encyclopaedia of Islam, Second Edition. Volume VII: Mif–Naz. Leiden: E. J. Brill. ISBN 978-90-04-09419-2.
- Bosworth, C.E (2003). "Hendušāh b. Sanjar". In Yarshater, Ehsan (ed.). Encyclopædia Iranica. Vol. XII/2: Hedāyat al-mota'allemin–Herat VII. London and New York: Routledge & Kegan Paul. pp. 181–182. ISBN 978-0-933273-75-7.
- Babaie, Sussan (2019). Iran After the Mongols. Bloomsbury Publishing. ISBN 978-1788315289.
- Wing, Patrick (2016). The Jalayirids: Dynastic State Formation in the Mongol Middle East. Edinburgh University Press. ISBN 978-1474402255.
