= Y. P. Verkhovsky =

Russian orientalist

Yuri Pavlovich Verkhovsky
- Юрий Павлович Верховский
- Born: 14 June 1891; Vitebsk, Russian Empire
- Died: 13 August 1962 (aged 71); Leningrad, Soviet Union

Yuri Pavlovich Verkhovsky (Russian: Юрий Павлович Верховский; 14 June 1891 – 13 August 1962) was a Russian orientalist and translator. He produced a Russian translation of Rashid al-Din's Jāmiʿ al-Tawārīkh, the most important single source for the history of the Ilkhanate period and the Mongol Empire.
