= Bolad =

Great Khan's representative in Ilkhanate
- In office 1285–1313
- Appointed by: Kublai Khan

Censor of the Censorate
- In office 1275–1277
- Succeeded by: Öz Temür (玉昔帖木儿)

Grand Supervisor of Agriculture
- In office 1272–1285
- Preceded by: Zhang Wenqian (张文谦)

Vice Military Affairs Commissioner
- In office c. 1277–1285

Personal details
- Born: c. 1240 Mongolia
- Died: April 26, 1313 (aged 72–73) Arran, Ilkhanate

Bolad (Mongolian: Болад чинсан, Болад ага, Болд, Persian: پولاد, romanized: Pulâd, Chinese: 孛羅; pinyin: Bóluó; Wade–Giles: Po-lo, d. 1313), was a Mongol minister of the Yuan dynasty of China, and later served in the Ilkhanate as the representative of the Great Khan of the Mongol Empire and cultural adviser to the Ilkhans. He also provided valuable information to Rashid-al-Din Hamadani to write about the Mongols. Mongolists consider him a cultural bridge between East and West. He was ennobled by Emperor Renzong of Yuan as Duke of Ze (澤國公) in 1311 and Prince of Yongfeng (永豐郡王) in 1313, posthumously.

== Background ==
Bolad was born in the Dörben (or Dörbet) tribe and his father, Jurghi (Yurki), who was a ba'urchi, attached to the palace of Genghis Khan's wife Börte. Since his father's title was prestige of honor, and he was explicitly trusted by Genghis Khan, Jurghi commanded a personal thousand of the guards of the Khagan. In 1248, the prince Kublai ordered the Han scholar Zhang Dehui (張德輝) to tutor Dorji (朵儿只), his eldest son, and Bolad, who was probably a child of seven or eight years. So Bolad became fluent in Chinese in addition to his native Mongolian language.

== In China ==
Bolad held the nobility title of a noyan. After Kublai ascended to the throne in 1260, he served as ba’urchi, inheriting his father's title. In addition, he did oral and written translations for the state affairs as one of the intellectuals of the Mongols. Bolad led a military contingent in 1264 to suppress Chinese rebels in Shandong.

Bolad also served as judge in the sensitive case of Ariq Böke (1264). He served as one of the directors of the new Office of State Ceremonial founded in October 1271, where he worked together with Liu Bingzhong, Xu Heng, and Xu Shilong (徐世隆) - head of the Minister of Imperial Rites. He later worked in the Censorate as censor in chief from 1275 but was forced to resign in 1277 in favor of more older Öz Temür (玉昔帖木儿).

While a member of Censorate, he also helped to establish the Office of Supervisors of Agriculture (Chinese: 司農司; pinyin: Sīnóngsī) in March 1270 with Zhang Wenqian (张文谦) as its director. Bolad later succeeded him in 1271 under the orders of Kublai, to which appointment Antong protested, claiming censorate and directorate are incompatible posts, to which Kublai didn't listen.

By 1277, he held multiple offices including Censor-in-Chief, Grand Supervisor of Agriculture, Director of Imperial Household Provisions, a member of Ministry of Imperial Rites, Vice Military Affairs Commissioner (the post was held by heir-apparent of khagan, thus he was also de facto Shumishi). In the latter capacity, he was instrumental in consolidation Mongol rule in Jiangnan during the Mongol conquest of Song. He accompanied Nomughan (son of Kublai), Toghon (脱欢 (札剌儿氏)) and Urughtai (忽魯歹) - grandson of Külgen, 6th son of Genghis Khan) in the campaign against Kaidu, however the operation failed and Bolad returned to capital in 1279. Same year he interrogated Song loyalist Wen Tianxiang, who didn't agree to submit Mongols.

Later Bolad was appointed to investigate Ahmad Fanakati same year. However, Fanakati was killed in 1282, which turned the fraud investigation into murder investigation. Bolad informed Kublai of Ahmad's misdeeds, which paved the way for execution of Ahmad's associates.

== In Ilkhanate ==
He was sent to the Ilkhanate in Persia soon after Arghun enthroned in 1285. He gave imperial seal, jarlig (imperial order) and crown to the new Ilkhan. Bolad could not return to Yuan dynasty due to the conflicts between the Yuan and the Chagatai Khanate headed by Kaidu, while his companion Isa (Chinese: 愛寫; pinyin: Àixiě) made it to Dadu 2 years later. Arghun appointed him a commander of his kheshig and assigned him of certain tasks in Khurasan. Although he had a family (his wife and two sons) left in Mongolia, Bolad was given a former concubine of Abaqa Khan named Shirin, thus starting a new life in the Middle East. His sons served the Yuan government while he had a big influence in Ilkhanate court. He was instrumental in appointing his favorite Afrasiab I as Hazaraspid atabeg of Luristan instead of his elder brother Ahmad in 1288, as well as execution of Malik Jalal al-Din, an associate of Buqa in 1289.

Facing difficulties to finance the coffers of the empty imperial treasury, Gaykhatu, summoned Bolad to advise him about the use of paper money then circulating in the Yuan. After taking consultation, the Ilkhan's court issued jiaochao in Iran in 1294. Although it proved to be a failure owing to the resistance of local population, this was the first time, the paper money was issued in the history of Iran.

Bolad also intermediated between Baydu and Ghazan, when the latter became the new Ilkhan in 1295. Although, his reputation may have been little diminished during Ghazan's reign, Ghazan respected Bolad. Seeing Mongol commoners selling their children as damaging the Mongol nation, similar to Kublai, Ghazan budgeted funds to redeem Mongol slaves and made Bolad the commander of the tumen which consisted of Mongol slave boys.

It is claimed that Bolad assisted Rashid-al-Din Hamadani to write Universal History because he knew Mongolian history very well. Under Öljeitü (1304–16), Bolad achieved great influence as chingsang and agha. According to Kashani, he ranked behind Chupan and Kutlushah who served the Ilkhan as main advisors. He was responsible for logistical support system during the Gilan campaign in 1307.

Bolad was awarded the Duke of Ze (Chinese: 澤國公) by Ayurbarwada Khan of the Yuan on 6 July 1311. Bolad died on 26 April 1313 in Arran (modern Republic of Azerbaijan). He was posthumously created Prince of Yongfeng (永豐郡王) by Ayurbarwada. He had a son in Ilkhanate, named "Pir Hamid".
