= Shams-i Fakhri =

Iranian lexicographer and philologist (fl. first half of the 14th-century)

Shams-i Fakhri (fl. first half of the 14th-century) was an Iranian lexicographer and philologist, who is best known as the author of the Mi'yar-i Jamali va-miftah-i Bu Ishaki ("The bird-trap offered to Jamal and the key entrusted to Abu Ishak"), dedicated in 1344 to the last Injuid ruler of Fars, Abu Ishaq Inju (r. 1343–1357).

During his youth, Shams-i Fakhri served in the court of the Hazaraspids of Luristan, where he dedicated the poem Mi‘yar-i nusrati to its ruler Nusrat al-Din Ahmad (r. 1296–1330) in 1313. He subsequently joined the court of Ghiyas al-Din ibn Rashid al-Din, the Persian vizier of the Mongol Ilkhanate. He later joined the court of the Injuids.

== Sources ==
- Boroujerdi, Mehrzad (2013). Mirror For the Muslim Prince: Islam and the Theory of Statecraft. Syracuse University Press. ISBN 978-0815632894. JSTOR 10.3366/j.ctt1j1w04g. (registration required)
- Massé, H. (1965). "Fak̲h̲rī". In Lewis, B.; Pellat, Ch. & Schacht, J. (eds.). The Encyclopaedia of Islam, Second Edition. Volume II: C–G. Leiden: E. J. Brill. OCLC 495469475.
