= Rabe Rashidi's Endowment =

14th-century book by Rashid al-Din Hamadani

- Memory of the World Programme
- Waqfiyya of Rab'-e Rashidi
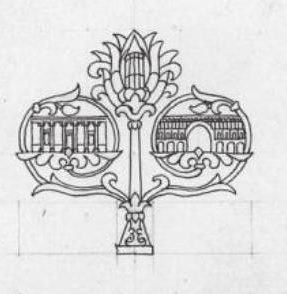
- Emblem of the Society for the National Heritage of Iran
- Country: Iran
- Inscription: 2007

The Waqfiyya of Rab'-e Rashidi (Persian: وقفنامه ربع رشیدی), officially titled Awaqfiya al-Rashidiya bi-Khatt al-Waqif fi Bayan Shurut Umur al-Waqf wa al-Masarif, (Note: Awqaf document of Rashidiya in the handwriting of the endower, explaining the conditions of the endowment affairs and expenditures) is a historical document written by Rashid al-Din Hamadani. This work details the endowed properties and the administrative regulations for the scientific complex Rab'-e Rashidi in Tabriz, Iran.

== Authorship and Authentication ==
The document was penned by Rashid al-Din Fazlullah, a prominent vizier of the Ilkhanid dynasty in the early 14th century. Its authenticity has been verified by numerous scholars, jurists, and officials, including Allameh Al-Hilli (648–726 AH / 1250–1325 AD), a distinguished Shi'a theologian and jurist.

== Preservation and UNESCO Recognition ==
Only one known copy of the Waqfiyya has survived. In 1949 (1348 AH), it was acquired from the descendants of Haji Zaka al-Dawla Sarajmir by the Iranian National Heritage Association and later donated to the Tabriz Library. Recognizing its historical and cultural significance, the National Library of Iran nominated the manuscript for inclusion in the UNESCO's Memory of the World Register, where it was inscribed in 2007 (1386 AH) as the first Iranian work to be registered.

== Publication ==
The Waqfiyya was critically edited and published by Mojtaba Minovi and Iraj Afshar, two notable Iranian scholars specializing in historical texts.

== Significance ==
This document serves as a crucial resource for understanding medieval Islamic endowment systems (waqf), educational institutions, and the administrative structures of the Ilkhanid period. It reflects the intellectual and cultural ambitions of Rashid al-Din Fazlullah, who aimed to establish Rab'-e Rashidi as a major center of learning in the Islamic world.
