= Hindushah Nakhjavani =

Iranian scholar

Fakhr al-Din Hindushah Nakhjavani (Persian: هندوشاه نخجوانی, romanized: Hindūšāh Naḫjawāni) or Nakhjivani (c. 1240 - c. 1328) was a medieval scholar, poet and historian.

== Life ==
His full name was Hindushah b. Sanjar b. Abdallah al-Ṣāḥebi al-Kirani. According to Clifford Edmund Bosworth, the nisba Sahebi meant that he was connected to a powerful political figure of his time - Shams al-Din Juwayni.

Hindushah was born in Kiran (near modern Kələntər Dizə, Nakhchivan). His father's name - Badr al-Din Sanjar - suggests that he was of Turkic parentage, who probably served Eldiguzids. Before 1275, he was a student in Mustansiriya Madrasah, studying ophtalmology, Arabic grammar and hadith under teachers like Shams al-Dīn Muḥammad Kīshī (d. 1294) and Abu al-Qasim Kashani. In 1275, he was appointed to Kashan, where his brother emir Sayf al-Dawla Mahmud (d. before 1258) was governor.

He also copied various manuscripts from other authors. He seems to have travelled to the Nizamiyya of Baghdad in 1280 and started teaching there. Meanwhile, he copied Najm al-Din al-Qazwini al-Katibi's Jāmi al-daqā’iq fi kašf al-haqā’iq (collection of Subtleties in Unveiling the Realities) there in 1284/5 and traveled to Nakhchivan's Sahibiyya Madrasah where he copied Abu al-Qasim al-Shatibi and al-Dani's works in 1294/5. He worked on an anthology of Arabic poetry called Mawarid al-adab composed in Tabriz on 30 April 1308, with his own additional 45 verses. Sometime later he went to Luristan and presented his work Tajāreb al-salaf, a Persian translation of Ibn al-Tiqtaqa's Kitab al-Fakhri with his own additions to atabeg Nusrat al-Din Ahmad in April–May 1314. Next year, he went to Shushtar where he copied several authors' works including Yaqut al-Hamawi, Mansur ibn Fallah Yamani, 'Ali ibn al-'Abbas al-Majusi and others. He returned to Azerbaijan in 1317, living and working in Baylaqan, Sultaniyeh, Sohrevard and Nakhchivan again in 1321.

Hindushah was credited by Kâtip Çelebi with authorship of a Turkish-Persian lexicon Ṣiḥāḥ al-ʻājam, which became a matter of debate among scholars. While scholars like O.F.Akimushkin who dated the work to 8 May 1279 and Gulam Huseyn Bigdali who published an edition of this book supported Hindushah's authorship, Charles Ambrose Storey, Muhit Tabataba’i and others doubted it. Azerbaijani orientalists Jamila Sadigova and Tayyiba Alasgarova in their joint critical edition criticized Bigdali's poor work, while supporting his claim that Hindushah was indeed the author. David Durand-Guédy refuted authorship claims, however agreed that Hindushah, being a Turk most probably spoke Turkic language besides Persian and Arabic, but was also interested in Adhari language.

He has often mixed with his son, more famous Muhammad Nakhjavani. He died before 1328 according to a mention in his son's work.

== Sources ==
- Bosworth, C.E (2003). "Hendušāh b. Sanjar". In Yarshater, Ehsan (ed.). Encyclopædia Iranica. Vol. XII/2: Hedāyat al-mota'allemin–Herat VII. London and New York: Routledge & Kegan Paul. pp. 181–182. ISBN 978-0-933273-75-7.
