= Shabankara'i =

Persian poet and historian (c.1298–c.1358)

- Born: c. 1298; Shabankara, Fars, Ilkhanate
- Died: c. 1358
- Occupations: Poet, historian
- Writing career
- Notable work: Majma‛ al-ansāb fī l- tawārīkh

Muhammad ibn Ali ibn Muhammad Shabankara'i (Persian: محمد بن علی بن محمد شبانکرائی; c. 1298–1358), better known as Shabankara'i (شبانکارایی) was a Persian poet and historian of Kurdish origin. He wrote in the Persian language and flourished during the late Ilkhanate era.

== Biography ==
Born in c. 1298, Shabankara'i was a native of the district of Shabankara (in the southern Iranian region of Fars), which was conquered by the Mongols in 1258. In 1332 or 1333, Shabankara'i completed his general history Majma‛ al-ansāb fī l- tawārīkh ("A Collection of Genealogies in the Histories"), which was dedicated to Ghiyath al-Din Muhammad, the Persian vizier of the Ilkhanate ruler Abu Sa'id Bahadur Khan (r. 1316–1335). However, the work was destroyed during a ransacking of the vizier's house due to the disorder that followed after Abu Sa'id's death. Shabankara'i thus wrote a second version of the work on 17 December 1337. He also composed a third version in 1343, which was dedicated to the Chobanid prince Pir Husayn. The Majma‛ al-ansāb is notable for containing valuable information about the reign of Öljaitü (r. 1304–1316) and Abu Sa'id. Not long after Shabankara'i's death in c. 1358, a certain Ghiyath al-Din ibn Ali Faryumadi from Gurgan or Khurasan, wrote a short continuation of the Majma‛ al-ansāb, which reports about the history of the Sarbadars and the local dynasties of Khurasan during the mid-to-late 14th century.

== Works ==
Shabankara'i's positive portrayal of the Mongols in his Majma‛ al-ansāb is a demonstration of the emerging Iranian support that they started to receive since the fall of Baghdad in 1258 and the stability and blossoming that followed:

"It must be known that from the start of the creation of the world and the creation of mankind no padeshah, sultan, khalif, Caesar, khan, qa'an, faqfor (Chinese emperor), khosrow, raj, Jaipal, Raja, tuba (king of Yemen), amir, or king has exercised such power or dominion over the world as Genghis Khan and his progeny have."

In his work, Shabankara'i also devotes chapters to local dynasties, such as the Shabankara and Hazaraspids. While there is no evidence of Shabankara'i being associated with the Hazaraspids, he praises their atabeg (ruler) Nusrat al-Din Ahmad (r. 1296–1330) like many other contemporary historians:

"Nusrat al-Din is the delight of atabegs' eyes and the essence of his dynasty. In the course of the long history of Iranian rulers (moluk-e Irān-zamin), no ruler such as him has appeared, with his good character and good faith. I have never seen such gifts, charity, and favors as his in any tradition and history."

== Sources ==
- Aigle, Denise (2022). "ŠABĀNKĀRAʾI, MOḤAMMAD". In Yarshater, Ehsan (ed.). Encyclopædia Iranica (Online ed.). Encyclopædia Iranica Foundation.
- Babaie, Sussan (2019). Iran After the Mongols. Bloomsbury Publishing. ISBN 978-1788315289.
- Bosworth, C.E & Jackson, P. (1997). "S̲h̲abānkāraʾī". In Bosworth, C. E.; van Donzel, E.; Heinrichs, W. P. & Lecomte, G. (eds.). The Encyclopaedia of Islam, Second Edition. Volume IX: San–Sze. Leiden: E. J. Brill. ISBN 978-90-04-10422-8.
- Jackson, Peter (2017). The Mongols and the Islamic World: From Conquest to Conversion. Yale University Press. pp. 1–448. ISBN 9780300227284. JSTOR 10.3366/j.ctt1n2tvq0. (registration required)
- Hope, Michael (2016). Power, Politics, and Tradition in the Mongol Empire and the Īlkhānate of Iran. Oxford University Press. ISBN 978-0198768593.
- Otsuka, Osamu (2020). "The Hazaraspid Dynasty's Legendary Kayanid Ancestry: the Flowering of Persian Literature under the Patronage of Local Rulers in the Late Il-khanid Period". Journal of Persianate Studies. 12 (2). Brill: 181–205. doi:10.1163/18747167-12341334. S2CID 213945417.
