= Nusrat al-Din Ahmad =

Ruler of Greater Luristan, 1296 to 1330

- Atabeg

Ruler of Luristan
- Reign: 1296–1330
- Predecessor: Afrasiyab I
- Successor: Rukn al-Din Yusufshah II
- Died: 1330
- Dynasty: Hazaraspids
- Father: Afrasiyab I
- Religion: Sunni Islam

Nusrat al-Din Ahmad was the Hazaraspid ruler (atabeg) of Luristan from 1296 to 1330. He succeeded his father Afrasiyab I after the latter's execution under the orders of their suzerain, the Ilkhanate ruler Ghazan (r. 1295–1304). Before his rise to kingship, Nusrat al-Din Ahmad had spent much time as a hostage at the court of the Ilkhanate. After his death, he was succeeded by his son Rukn al-Din Yusufshah II.

Nusrat al-Din Ahmad was notably a patron of Persian literature, with three works dedicated to him. The historical chronicle of Tajarib al-Salaf, a Persian translation and modification of the Arabic Kitab al-fakhri, was presented to Nusrat al-Din Ahmad by Hindushah Nakhjavani after 1323. The second work—also a historical chronicle—was the Mu‘jam fi athar muluk al-Ajam by Sharaf al-Din Fazlullah Qazvini. The third work was the Mi‘yar-i nusrati, a poem written by Shams-i Fakhri in 1313.

In the Mu‘jam, Nusrat al-Din Ahmad is regarded a "the greatest sovereign, the ruler of the Persian kings, the Chosroes of Iran, heir to the Kayanid sovereignty, the Jamshid of the age, the Darius of the time, eraser of the traces of the Barmakids," thus demonstrating the Iranian cultural environment that he was part of. He is likewise portrayed in a positive light by the Ilkhanate court historians Shabankara'i and Hamdallah Mustawfi.

== Sources ==
- Boroujerdi, Mehrzad (2013). Mirror For the Muslim Prince: Islam and the Theory of Statecraft. Syracuse University Press. ISBN 978-0815632894. JSTOR 10.3366/j.ctt1j1w04g. (registration required)
- Bosworth, C.E (2003). "Hendušāh b. Sanjar". In Yarshater, Ehsan (ed.). Encyclopædia Iranica. Vol. XII/2: Hedāyat al-mota'allemin–Herat VII. London and New York: Routledge & Kegan Paul. pp. 181–182. ISBN 978-0-933273-75-7.
- Otsuka, Osamu (2020). "The Hazaraspid Dynasty's Legendary Kayanid Ancestry: the Flowering of Persian Literature under the Patronage of Local Rulers in the Late Il-khanid Period". Journal of Persianate Studies. 12 (2). Brill: 181–205. doi:10.1163/18747167-12341334. S2CID 213945417.
- Spuler, B. (1987). "Atābakān-e Lorestān". In Yarshater, Ehsan (ed.). Encyclopædia Iranica. Vol. II/8: Aśoka IV–Āṯār al-Wozarāʾ. London and New York: Routledge & Kegan Paul. pp. 896–898. ISBN 978-0-71009-108-6.
