= Rab'-e Rashidi =

Historic site in Tabriz, Iran

Coordinates: 38°04′45″N 46°19′46″E

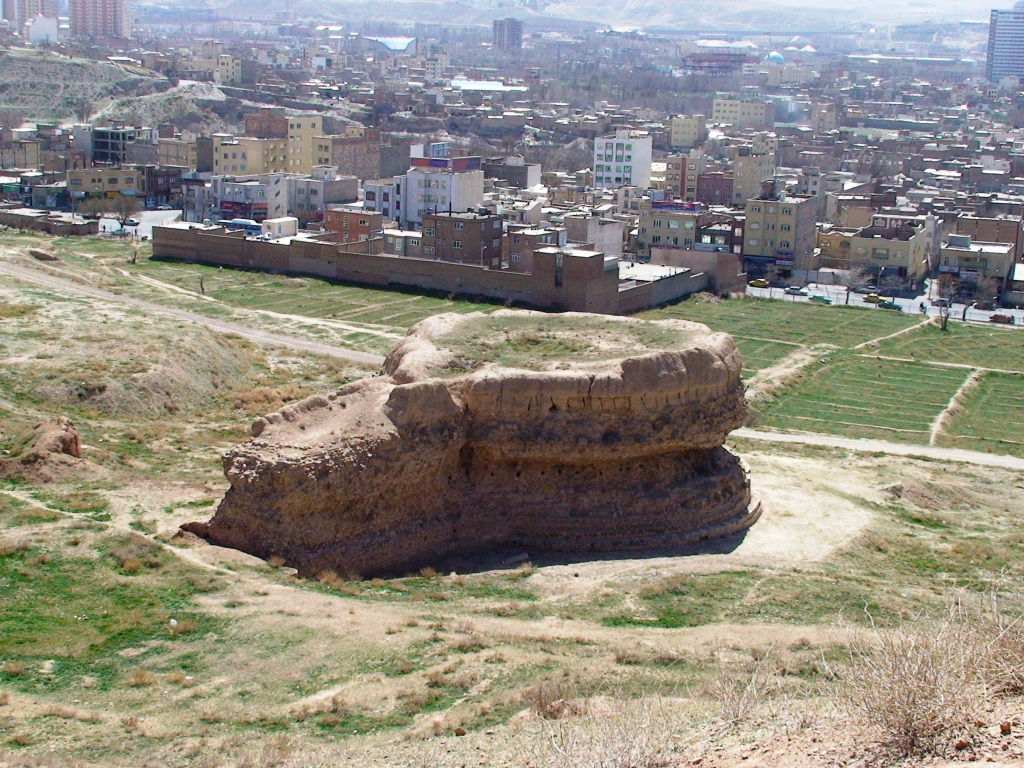
Ruins of Rab'-e Rashidi

Rab'-e Rashidi (Persian: رَبع رشیدی) is the site of a historic building complex including a school and a workshop for producing books that was constructed in the early 14th century during the reign of Ghazan, a ruler of the Ilkhanid dynasty, in the northeastern part of the city of Tabriz, Iran. Other buildings later replaced these, and the site is now ruined, but it is the original complex that gives the site its fame. It was founded and richly endowed by Rashid al-Din Hamadani, the chief minister of Ghazan Khan. Rashid al-Din sought to gather the most famous intellectuals of his time in fields of philosophy, science and medicine. The establishment began to decline after the execution of Rashid al-Din in 1318, though his son Ghiyas al-Din ibn Rashid al-Din led a revival in the 1330s until his own murder in 1336.

The foundation document of the complex survives, dated August 1307, and gives a detailed picture of how the complex was supposed to function. There are later appendices, and the site may well have been functioning before 1307. There was provision for over 100 employees, about a quarter of them labourers and the rest skilled professionals, as well as 220 slaves. There was also provision for salaried students. In addition to all these the complex held a workshop for the production of books, where the early manuscripts of the Jami' al-tawarikh, and in the 1330s probably the Great Mongol Shahnameh, were produced.

The site had fallen into ruin when Shah Abbas chose it for a fort, including the governor's palace. By the end of the 17th century these buildings, too, were in ruins, as a traveller reported. Only a small part of the ruined establishment remains standing, with most of its remaining structures perhaps underground. Archaeologists continue to excavate and study the large complex.

Today, the historical elements of the buildings of the Rab'-e Rashidi can no longer be identified. All that remains are some masonry bases of the fortifications that were built either during the 14th century or by Shah Abbas in the 17th century. The most prominent of the masonry bases still extant has a rectangular projection, possibly the foundation for an astrological observatory that is mentioned in Rashid al-Din's writings. Also found on the site were mosaic fragments that may date from Rashid al-Din's time up until the Safavid period.

== Establishment ==
The endowment was of nearly 50,000 dinars, a huge sum. Almost half of this went to the overseers, Rashid al din himself while alive, and his sons thereafter. Salaries were set out for the employees, with the highest paid the senior of the two professors, at 500 dinars annually. He had an assistant (200 dinars) and ten paid students, earning 30 dinars for a five-year period. The other professor had two students.

The Quran was recited at the tomb around the clock, with 24 reciters paid 50 dinars on the staff, as well as four more senior religious staff. There was a special area for Sufi devotions, with a shaikh (150 dinars) and 5 other Sufis (30 dinars). There was a hospital with a head doctor (330) and a surgeon/eye-doctor (100), as well as two trainees (30 dinars for 5 years).

The 220 slaves included about 150 gardeners, and 20 Turks, who were given the more physical roles, including security and rent collecting. These received a 50% higher bread ration than the other slaves. All the staff also received bread and other food in addition to their salaries, and it was also distributed to those attending the tomb at certain times, and 100 of the poor were fed daily.

The complex, at the top of a hill, was surrounded by a wall. It was entered through a large portal, with minarets, giving onto a courtyard with four iwans. Beyond this lay the main buildings, and other facilities such as a bathhouse.

== History ==
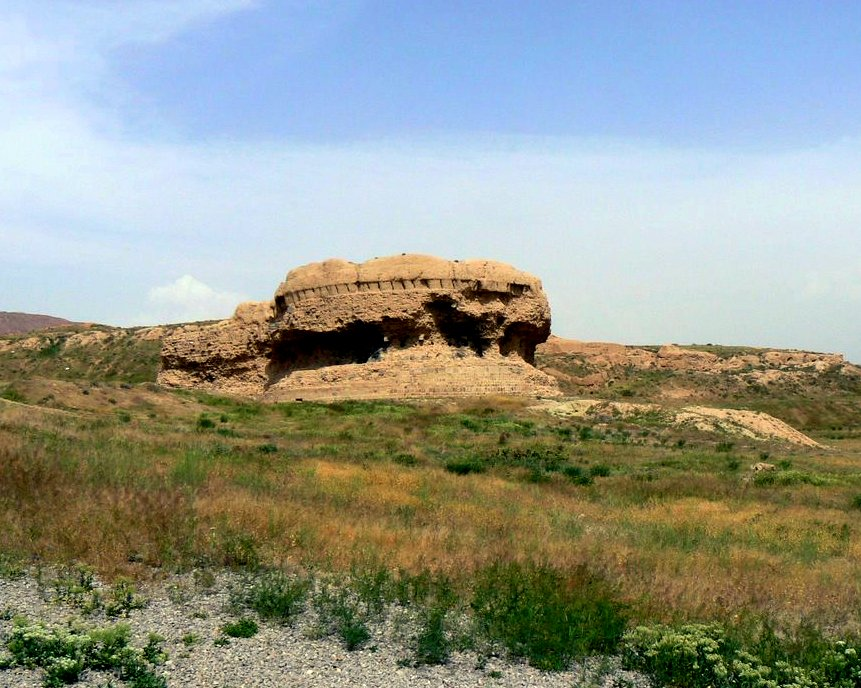
Another view of Rabe Rashidi

Rab'-e Rashidi origins date to the 13th century, when Rashid-al-Din Hamadani, the minister of Ghazan Khan, the seventh ruler of the Ilkhanid dynasty, established a large academic center in Tabriz, the capital of Ilkhanid dynasty at the time, which he named Rab'-e Rashidi. After his death several years later, Khajeh Rashid was buried in this place in the tomb he had prepared.

The complex was equipped with a paper factory, a library, a hospital (Dar-ol-Shafa), Dar-ol Quran (Quranic Center), residential facilities for teachers, student’s quarter, a big caravansary and other facilities during the Ilkhanid era. Students from Iran, China, Egypt, and Syria studied subjects here under the supervision of intellectuals, scientists, physicians and Islamic scholars.

The main components of the foundation were a library, a hospice, a hospital, a khanqah, and a tomb with winter and summer mosques. The tomb was originally that of Rashid al-Din, built by his son Muhammed Ghiyath. However, due to what is believed to have been a conspiracy, Rashid al-Din was executed under the false pretext that he had poisoned Oljeitu Khan. This turn of events was further compounded by rumors that emerged during the reign of Miran Shah (1404-1407) that Rashid al-Din had been Jewish; consequently, his remains were exhumed from his tomb at the Rab'-e Rashidi and moved to a Jewish cemetery.

In addition to the components of the foundation, the complex became surrounded by a residential quarter. It contained caravanserais, shops, baths, storehouses, mills, factories, and thirty thousand houses. The entire complex was surrounded by a wall that Ghazan Khan had begun building to enclose the entire city of Tabriz, and later by a second one that enclosed its suburbs.

Since his reputation had been tainted and his foundation plundered, the Rab'-e Rashidi began to decline after the death of Rashid al-Din in 1318. Although Rashid al-Din's son Muhammed Ghiyath attempted to expand the foundation after his father's death, he too was put to death in 1336, and the foundation was again looted. According to later stories, before Shah Abbas, a ruler by the name of Malik Ashraf later took over the site in 1351 and expanded it further by building fortifications, mosques, hospitals and schools.
