= Kələntər Dizə =

- Municipality
- Location within Azerbaijan
- Coordinates: 38°56′N 45°50′E
- Country: Azerbaijan
- Autonomous republic: Nakhchivan
- District: Ordubad

Population (2005)
  - Total: 237
- Time zone: UTC+4 (AZT)

Kələntər Dizə (also, Kalantar Diza, Kelenter Dize and Kalantardiza) is a village and municipality in the Ordubad District of Nakhchivan, Azerbaijan. It is located in the near of the Ordubad-Nakhchivan highway, 21 km in the north from the district center. There are club, library and a medical center in the village. It has a population of 237.

== Etymology ==
The name of the Kələntər Dizə (Kalantar-Diza) made out from the components of kələntər (a person who controls the trade and craftsmanship which is appointed by the beylerbeyi in the Middle Ages; the name of job which belongs to family generation) and dizə ("village", "settlements") means "Diza village which belongs to the kalantars". There are information about the selection by heredity of the kələntərlər (kalantars) from the generation of Hatem bey Ordubadi I in the 16th century. It can be assumed that this village has belonged to members of the same generation.
