= Sharaf al-Din Fazlullah Qazvini =

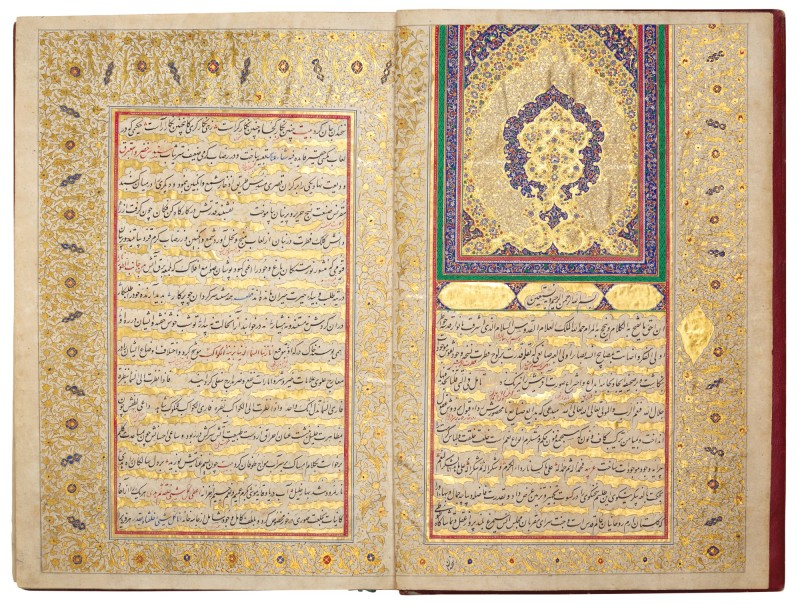
Manuscript of Qazvini's Mu‘jam fi athar muluk al-Ajam. Copy created in Qajar Iran, probably Shiraz, dated 1845

Sharaf al-Din Fazlullah Qazvini (died 1339) was the author of the Persian language Mu‘jam fi athar muluk al-Ajam, a history of ancient Iran.

== Sources ==
- Boroujerdi, Mehrzad (2013). Mirror For the Muslim Prince: Islam and the Theory of Statecraft. Syracuse University Press. ISBN 978-0815632894. JSTOR 10.3366/j.ctt1j1w04g. (registration required)
