= Salman Savaji =

14th century Persian poet

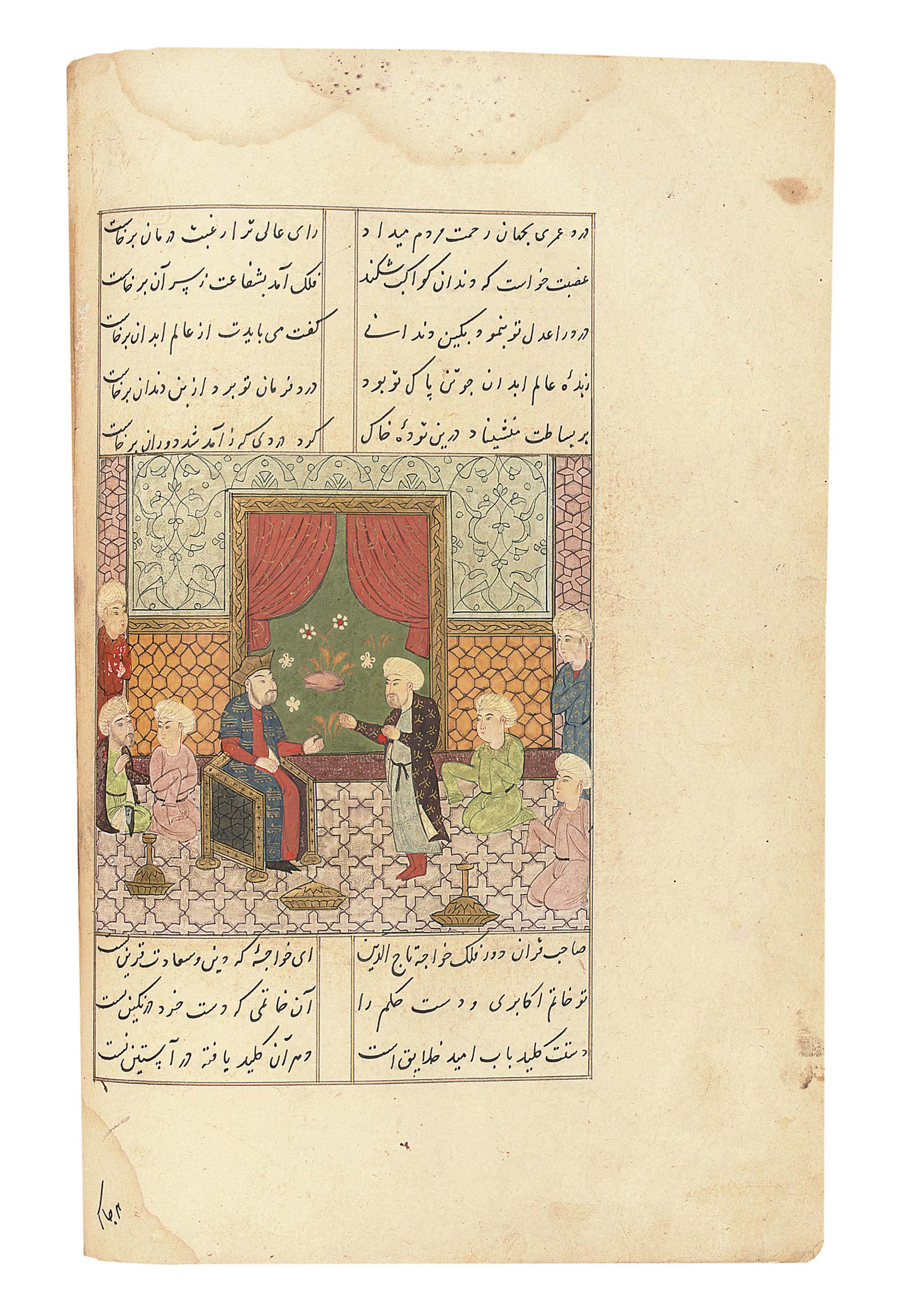
Manuscript of Salman Savaji's divan, copy created in Safavid Iran, dated 16th century with later additions

Salman Savaji (died 1376) was a Persian poet, who served as a court poet of the Jalayirids. He was born in 1309/10 in the town of Savah, located in Persian Iraq (Irāq-i Ajam), a region corresponding to the western part of Iran. He belonged to a family of accountants, who had served the viziers of the Ilkhanate. His father served under the vizier Sa'd al-Din Savaji, who was also from Savah. Salman himself received an education in the field of the divan and chancery, but had also started to distinguish himself as a poet during the reign of the last Ilkhanate ruler Abu Sa'id Bahadur Khan (r. 1316–1335). He dedicated a qasida (ode) entitled Bada'i al-Ashar (or Abhar) to his patron, the vizier Ghiyath al-Din Muhammad (died 1336).

== Sources ==
- Khafipour, Hani (2019). The Empires of the Near East and India: Source Studies of the Safavid, Ottoman, and Mughal Literate Communities. Columbia University Press. ISBN 978-0231174374.
- Babaie, Sussan (2019). Iran After the Mongols. Bloomsbury Publishing. ISBN 978-1788315289.
- Wing, Patrick (2016). The Jalayirids: Dynastic State Formation in the Mongol Middle East. Edinburgh University Press. ISBN 978-1474402255.
