= Rashid al-Din Hamadani =

Persian physician and historian (1247–1318)

- رشیدالدین فضل‌الله همدانی
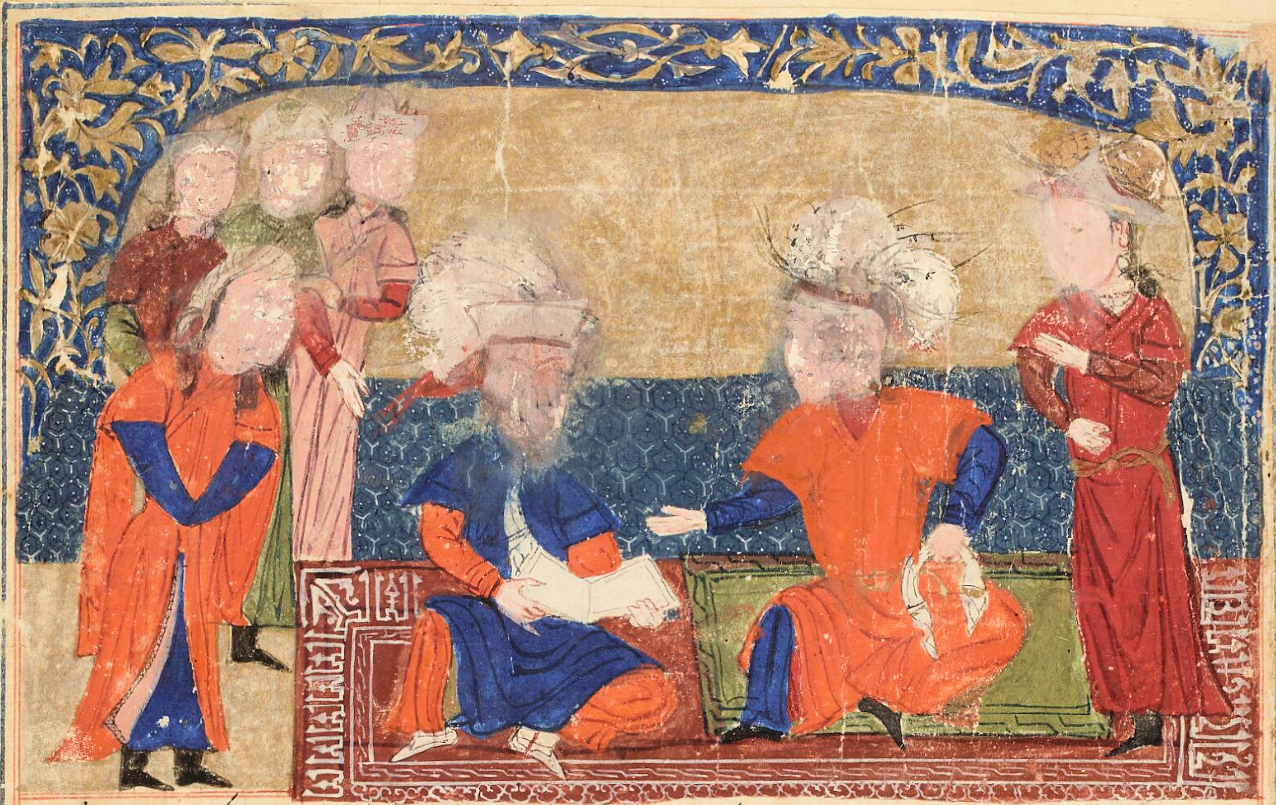
- Rashid al-Din (center left) presenting his book to Ghazan (Jami al-Tawarikh, BNF Supplément Persan 1113, 1430–1434).
- Born: 1247; Hamadan, Ilkhanate
- Died: 1318 (aged 70–71); Tabriz, Ilkhanate
- Occupations: Historian; physician; statesman

Academic work
- Era: Ilkhanate period
- Main interests: History, medicine
- Notable works: Jāmiʿ al-Tawārīkh

Rashīd al-Dīn Ṭabīb (Persian: رشیدالدین طبیب; 1247–1318; also known as Rašīd al-Dīn Fażl-Allāh Hamadānī or Rashīd al-Dīn Faḍlullāh Hamadānī, i.e. "of Hamadan", Persian: رشیدالدین فضل‌الله همدانی) was a statesman, historian, and physician in Ilkhanate Iran.

Having converted to Islam from Judaism by the age of 30 in 1277, Rashid al-Din became the powerful vizier of Ilkhan Ghazan. He was commissioned by Ghazan to write the Jāmiʿ al-Tawārīkh, now considered the most important single source for the history of the Ilkhanate period and the Mongol Empire. He retained his position as a vizier until 1316.

After being charged with poisoning the Ilkhanid king Öljaitü, he was executed in 1318.

Historian Morris Rossabi calls Rashid al-Din "arguably the most distinguished figure in Persia during Mongolian rule". He was a prolific author and established the Rab'-e Rashidi academic foundation in Tabriz.

== Biography ==
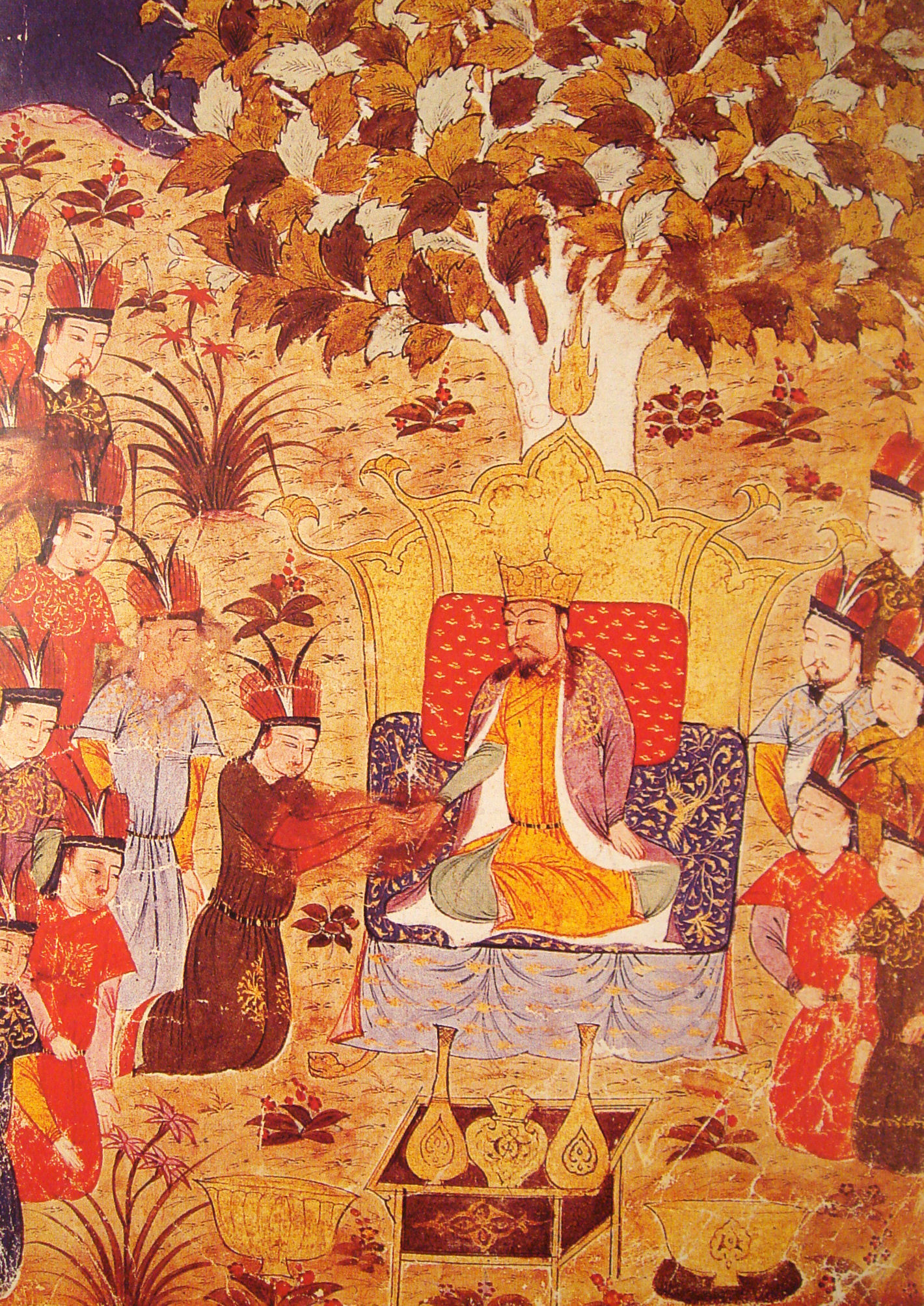
Genghis Khan (center) at the coronation of his son Ögedei, illustration by Rashid al-Din, early 14th century

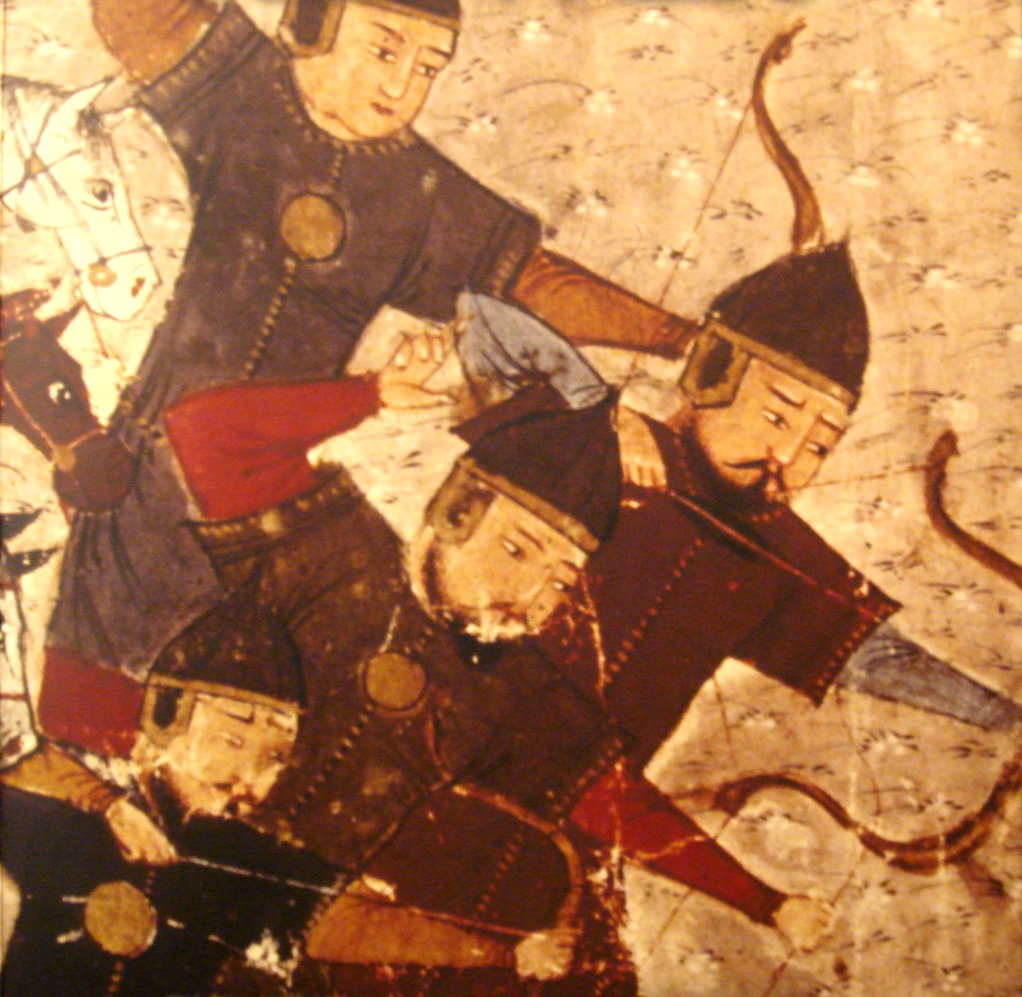
Mongol soldiers in the Jāmiʿ al-Tawārīkh of Rashid al-Din, BnF. MS. Supplément Persan 1113. 1430-1434 AD.

Rashid al-Din was born in 1247 into a Persian Jewish family from Hamadan province. His grandfather had been a courtier to the founder of the Ilkhanate, Hulagu Khan, and Rashid al-Din's father was an apothecary at the court. He converted to Islam around the age of thirty.

Rashid was trained as a physician and started service under Hulagu's son, Abaqa Khan. He rose to become the Grand Vizier of the Ilkhanid court at Soltaniyeh, near Qazvin. He served as vizier and physician under the Ilkhans Ghazan and Öljaitü before falling to court intrigues during the reign of Abu Sa'id Bahadur Khan, whose ministers had him killed at the age of seventy. His son, Ghiyath al-Din Muhammad, briefly served as vizier after him.

== Jāmiʿ al-Tawārīkh ==
The Jāmiʿ al-Tawārīkh "Compendium of Chronicles" was commissioned by Ghazan and initially was a history of the Mongols and their dynasty, but gradually expanded to include the entire history since Adam to Rashid al-Din's time.

Rashid was assisted by Bolad, a Mongol nobleman who was the emissary of the Great Khan to the Ilkhanid court. Bolad provided him with much background about the Mongols.

The Compendium was completed between 1307 and 1316, during the reign of Öljaitü.

=== Calligraphy workshop: Rab' i-Rashidi ===
The work was executed at the elaborate scriptorium Rab'-e Rashidi at Qazvin, where a large team of calligraphers and illustrators were employed to produce lavishly illustrated books. These books could also be copied, while preserving accuracy, using a printing process imported from China.

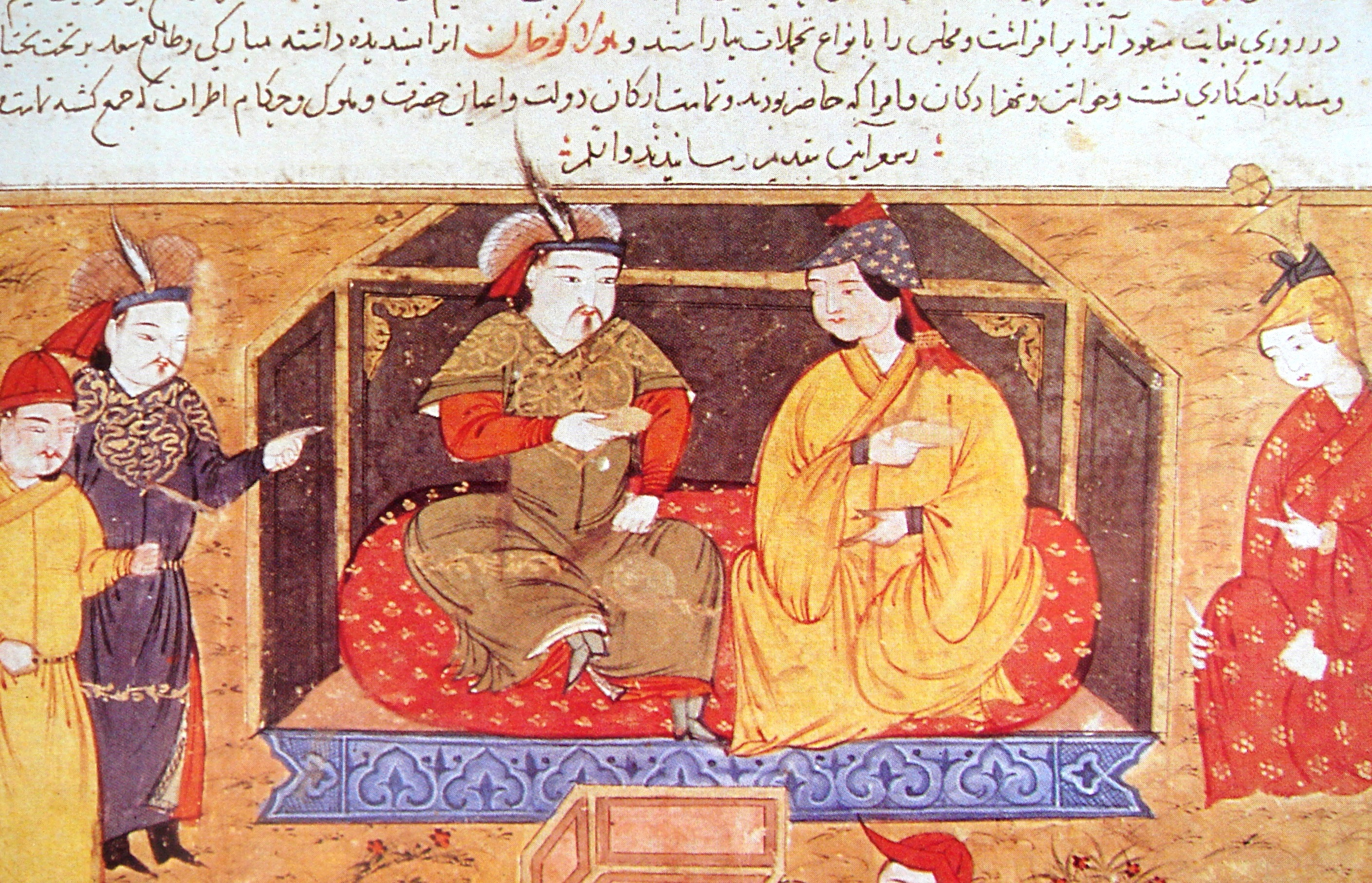
Hulagu Khan with his Eastern Christian wife, Doquz Khatun. Hulagu conquered Muslim Syria, in collaboration with Christian forces from Cilician Armenia, Georgia, and Antioch. From Rashid al-Din's work.

The work was at the time of completion, c. 1307, of monumental size. Several sections have not survived or been discovered. Portions of the Jāmiʿ al-Tawārīkh survive in lavishly illustrated manuscripts, believed to have been produced during Rashid's lifetime and perhaps under his direct supervision at the Rab'-e Rashidi workshop.

=== Historiographical significance ===
Volumes I and II of the Jāmiʿ al-Tawārīkh have survived and are of great importance for the study of the Ilkhanate. Volume I "contains the history of the Turkish and Mongol tribes, including their tribal legends, genealogies, myths and the history of the Mongol conquests from the time of Genghis Khan to the end of the reign of Ghazan Khan", while volume II describes "the history of all the peoples with whom the Mongols had fought or with whom they had exchanged embassies". In his narration down to the reign of Möngke Khan (1251–1259), Ata-Malik Juvayni was Rashid al-Din's main source; however, he also utilized numerous now-lost Far Eastern and other sources. The Jāmiʿ al-Tawārīkh is perhaps the single most comprehensive Persian source on the Mongol period. For the period of Genghis Khan, his sources included the now lost Altan Debter "Golden Book". His treatment of the Ilkhanid period seems to be biased, as he was a high official, yet it is still seen as the most valuable written source for the dynasty.

The third volume is either lost or was never completed; its topic was "historical geography".

The most important historiographic legacy of the Jāmiʿ al-Tawārīkh may be its documentation of the cultural mixing and ensuing dynamism that led to the greatness of the subsequent Timurid, Safavid Iran, Qajar, and Ottoman Empires, many aspects of which were transmitted to Europe and influenced the Renaissance. This was the product of the geographical extension of the Mongol Empire and is most clearly reflected in this work by Rashid al-Din. The text describes the different peoples with whom the Mongols came into contact and is one of the first attempts to transcend a single cultural perspective and to treat history on a universal scale. The Jāmiʿ attempted to provide a history of the whole world of that era, though many parts are lost.

One of the volumes of the Jāmiʿ al-Tawārīkh deals with an extensive History of the Franks (1305/1306), possibly based on information from Europeans working under the Ilkhanids such as Isol the Pisan or the Dominican friars, which is a generally consistent description with many details on Europe's political organization, the use of mappae mundi by Italian mariners and regnal chronologies derived from the chronicle of Martin of Opava (d. 1278).

==== Buddhist-Islamic Discourse ====
In the work Jāmiʿ al-Tawārīkh presents Buddhism in twenty chapters, making it the most extensive and well-informed presentation of Buddhism in any Muslim source. For this endeavour he spoke to Buddhists, visited Buddhist temples, saw statues and witnessed rituals. He was mostly drawing from Tantric Buddhism as it had the closest proximity in Iran. He reports on basic Buddhist doctrines such as the Wheel of Life. He notes down how the Buddha visited the Six Realms of Existence and how he learnt that even within heavenly realms (deva) suffering exists. He goes on to describe the heavenly realms and the eight hell realms (naraka). To describe the heavenly realm in Buddhism he explains it terms of the Garden of Eden. Furthermore he records that the generous and kind are born in rich families, while those who ridicule others are born full of infirmities. The extensive accounts of hell and heaven might have taken place through their similarities to Islamic depictions of these realms, especially Muhammad's famous journey to these realms. These similarities could point to infleunces between Buddhism and Islam in their depictions of heaven and hell. Other similarities are found in the terms Rashid al-Nadin used for concepts. One example being how he calls the Buddhist demon Mara "Iblis". When Iblis/Mara sends down his daughters to tempt the Buddha, those demons are called huris, the beautiful maidens of Islamic lore. Another Buddhist doctrine he describes in Islamic reference is nirvana. He compares it to Sufi conceptualisations.

=== Book transmission: printing and translation ===
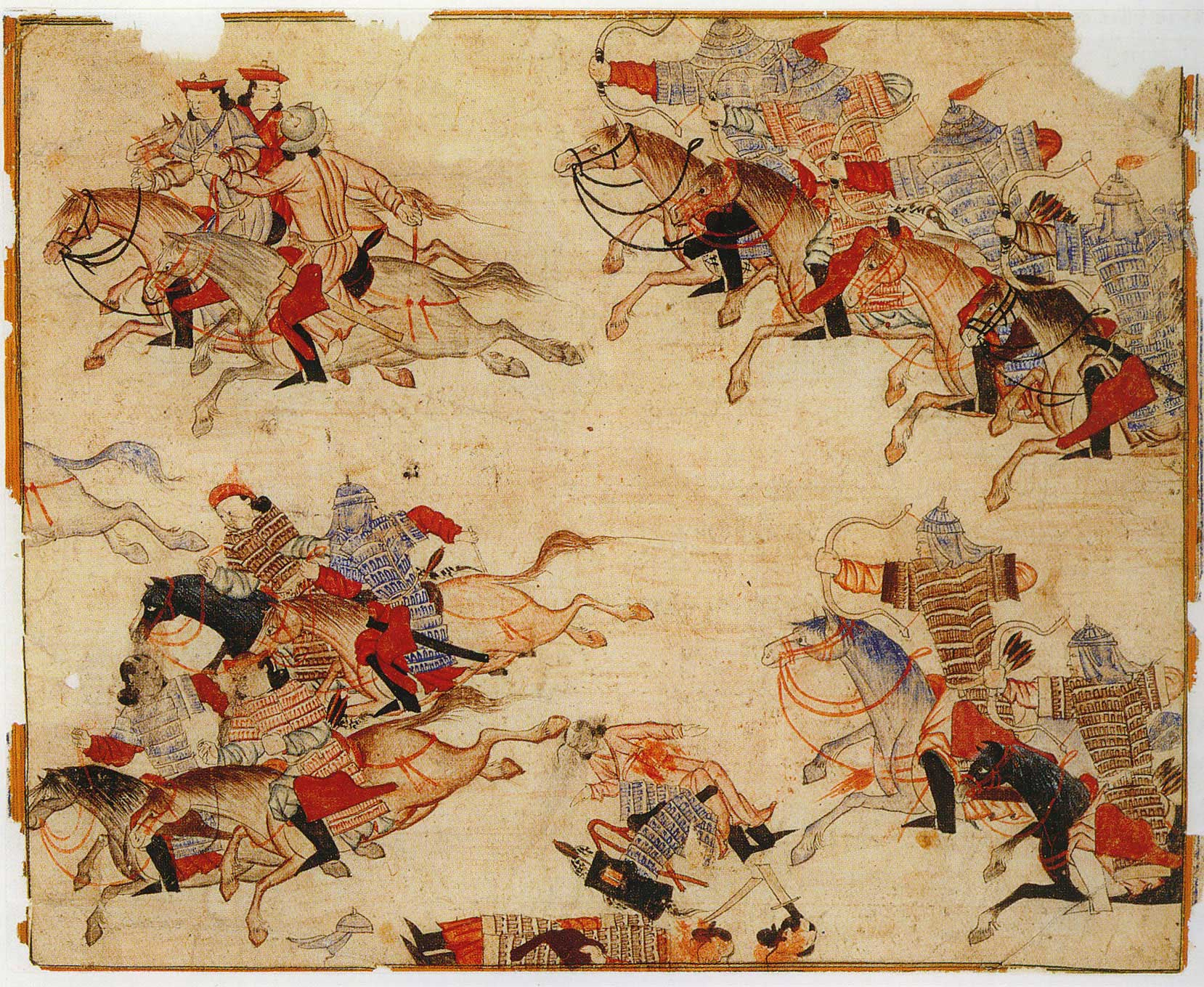
Mongol cavalry pursuing their enemy

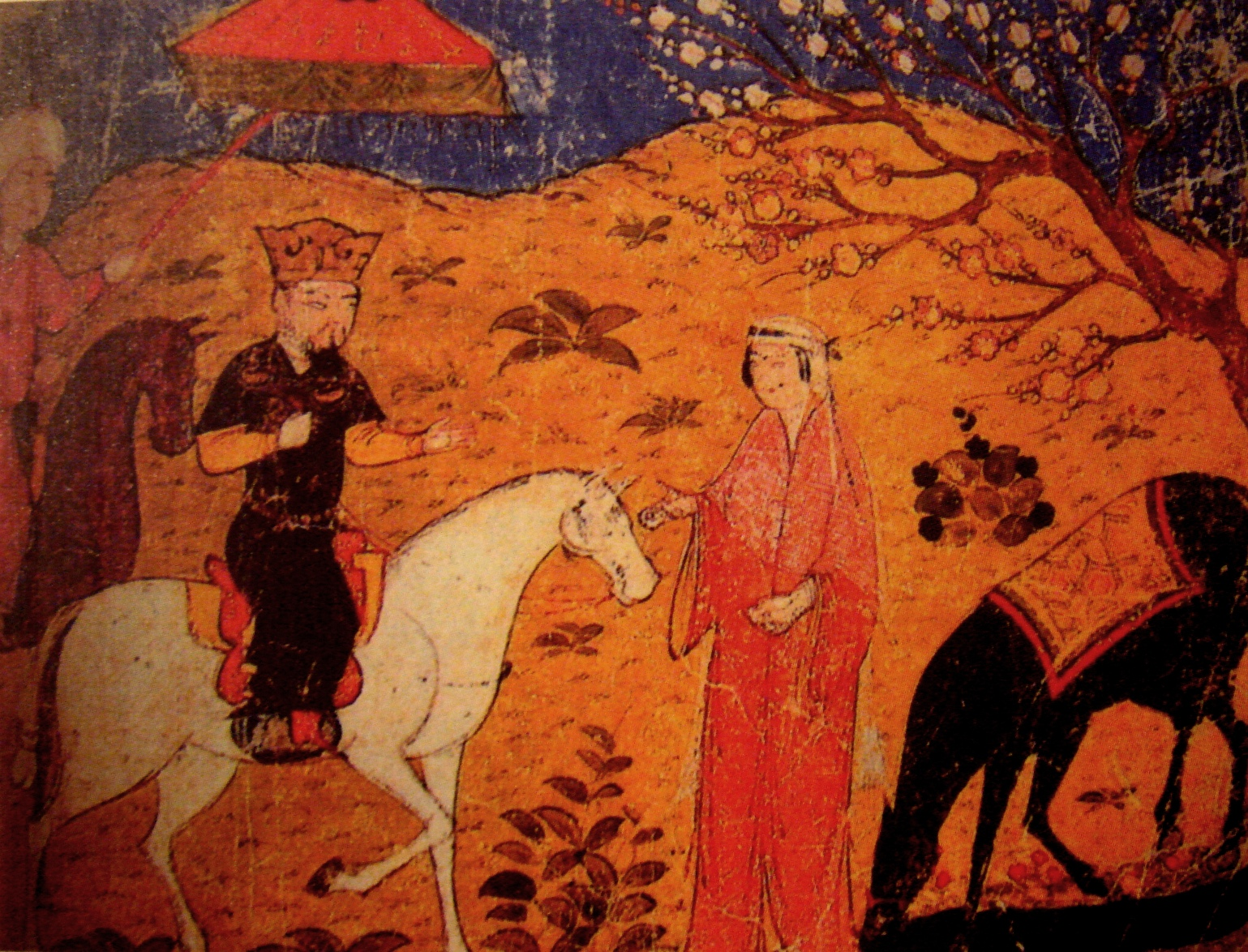
Ghazan on his horse. Rashid al-Din, Jāmiʿ al-Tawārīkh.

Rashid al-Din also collected all of his compositions into a single volume, entitled Jami' al-Tasanif al-Rashidi ("The Collected Works of Rashid"), complete with maps and illustrations. He even had some of his shorter works, on medicine and government, translated into Chinese. Anyone who wished was given access to his works and encouraged to copy them. In order to facilitate this, he set aside a fund to pay for the annual transcription of two complete manuscripts of his works, one in Arabic and one in Persian.

The printing process used at the workshop has been described by Rashid al-Din, and bears very strong resemblance to the processes used in the large printing ventures in China under Feng Dao (932–953):

[W]hen any book was desired, a copy was made by a skillful calligrapher on tablets and carefully corrected by proof-readers whose names were inscribed on the back of the tablets. The letters were then cut out by expert engravers, and all pages of the books consecutively numbered. When completed, the tablets were placed in sealed bags to be kept by reliable persons, and if anyone wanted a copy of the book, he paid the charges fixed by the government. The tablets were then taken out of the bags and imposed on leaves of paper to obtain the printed sheets as desired. In this way, alterations could not be made and documents could be faithfully transmitted. Under this system he had copies made, lent them to friends, and urged them to transcribe them and return the originals. He had Arabic translations made of those works he composed in Persian, and Persian translations of works composed in Arabic. When the translations had been prepared, he deposited them in the mosque library of the Rab'-e Rashidi.

=== Authorship and plagiarism accusations ===
The authorship of the Jāmiʿ al-Tawārīkh has been questioned on several grounds.

Abu al-Qasim Kashani (d. 1324), who wrote the most important extant contemporary source on Öljaitü, maintained that he himself was the true author of the Jāmiʿ al-Tawārīkh, "for which Rashid al-Din had stolen not only the credit but also the very considerable financial rewards."

According to Encyclopædia Iranica, "While there is little reason to doubt Rashid al-Din’s overall authorship of the Jāmiʿ al-Tawārīkh, the work has generally been considered a collective effort, partly carried out by research assistants." Kashani may have been one of those assistants.

Some also contended that it was a translation of a Mongol original.

== Authorship of his Letters ==
Scholars are in dispute about whether Rashid al-Din's Letters are a forgery or not. According to David Morgan in The Mongols, Alexander Morton has shown them to be a forgery, probably from the Timurid period. One scholar who has attempted to defend the letters' authenticity is Abolala Soudovar.

== Fahlavi poems ==
There are some fahlavīyāt or fahlavī poems by him, seemingly in his native dialect: a hemistich called zabān-e fahlavī ("Fahlavi language"; see Rašīd-al-Dīn Fażl-Allāh, Kašf al-ḥaqāʾeq I, Tehran, 1976, p. 290), a quatrain called bayt-efahlavī ("Fahlavi/Pahlavi verse/poetic couplet/quatrain"), and another hemistich titled zabān-e pahlavī ("Fahlavi language").

== Loss of influence and death ==
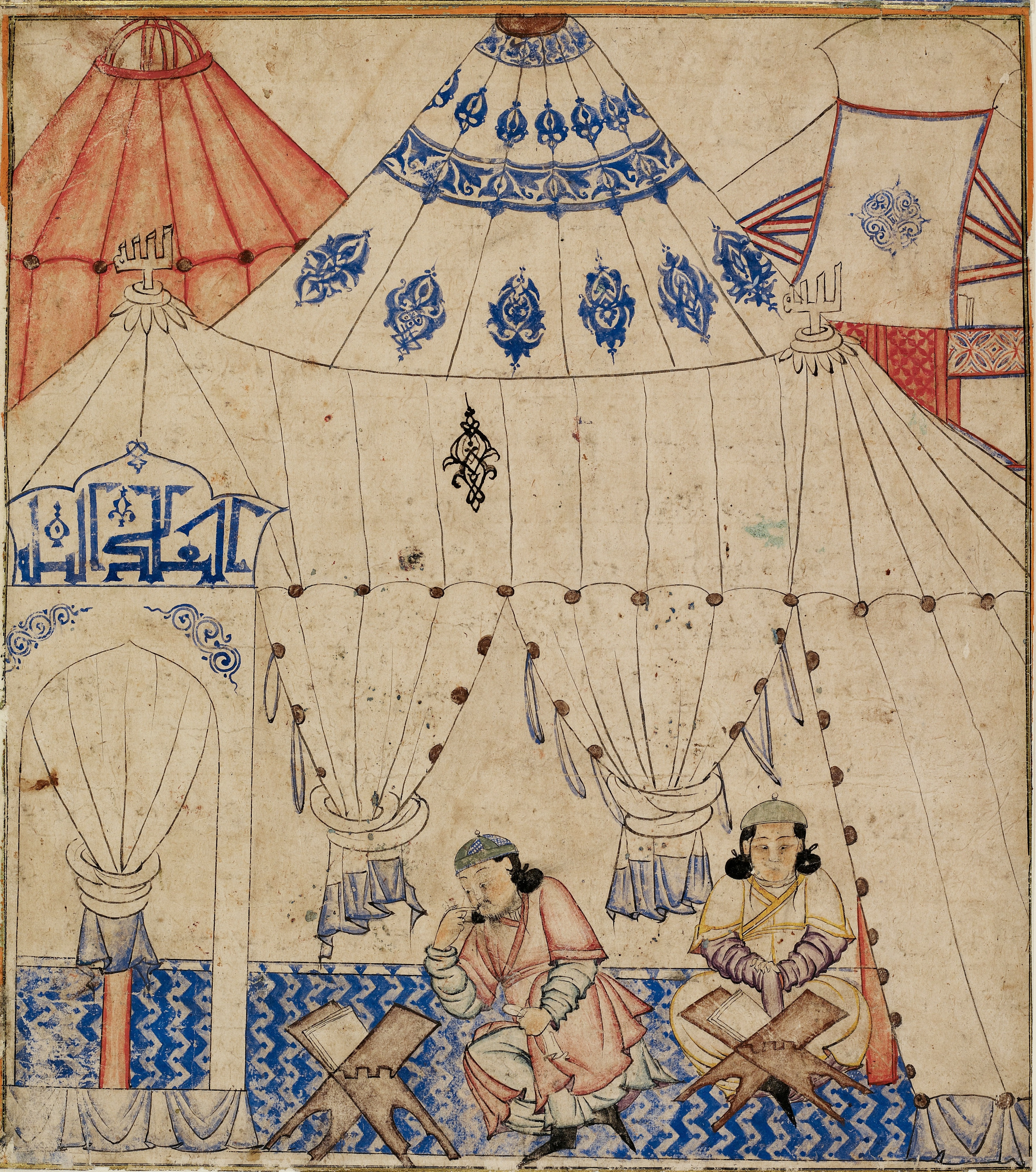
Mongols studying the Quran

In 1312, his colleague Sa'd-al-Din Mohammad Avaji fell from power and was replaced by Taj-al-Din Ali-Shah Jilani. Then, in 1314, Öljaitü died and power passed to his son, Abu Sa'id Bahadur Khan, who sided with Ali-Shah. In 1318, Rashid al-Din was charged with having poisoned Öljaitü and was executed on July 13, at the age of seventy. His Jewish ancestry was referenced numerous times in the court. His head was carried around the city after the execution and people were chanting: "This is the head of the Jew who abused God's name, may God's curse be upon him."

His property was confiscated and Rab'-e Rashidi, with its scriptorium and its precious copies, were turned over to the Mongol soldiery. A century later, during the reign of Timur's son Miran Shah, Rashid al-Din's bones were exhumed from the Muslim cemetery and reburied in the Jewish cemetery.

== National and political thoughts ==
Rashid al-din has been described as an ardent Sunni Muslim, an Iranian patriot and an admirer of the Iranian state traditions. His letters intensely criticize the sub-national Mongol amirs (whom he referred to as "Turks"), who made the centralized administration of the Ilkhan difficult. However, his historical writings do not express the same anti-Mongol and Iranian patriotic views so clearly or frequently. The authorship of the letters, which do express them clearly, is disputed and many historians consider them a forgery, as explained above.

== See also ==
- List of Muslim historians
- List of pre-modern Iranian scientists and scholars

== Sources ==
- Ashraf, Ahmad (2006). "Iranian identity iii. Medieval Islamic period". Encyclopædia Iranica, Vol. XIII, Fasc. 5. pp. 507–522.
- Babaie, Sussan (2019). Iran After the Mongols. Bloomsbury Publishing. pp. 1–320. ISBN 9781786736017.
- Boyle, John Andrew (1971). "Rashīd al-Dīn: The First World Historian". Iran. 9: 19–26. doi:10.2307/4300435. ISSN 0578-6967. JSTOR 4300435.
- Bregel, Yuri (1999). "Rashid al-Din, Fazlallah". Encyclopedia of historians and historical writing. London: Fitzroy Dearborn. pp. 982–983. ISBN 9781884964336.
- Jackson, Peter (2017). The Mongols and the Islamic World: From Conquest to Conversion. Yale University Press. pp. 1–448. ISBN 9780300227284. JSTOR 10.3366/j.ctt1n2tvq0. (registration required)
- Lane, George E. (2012). "The Mongols in Iran". In Daryaee, Touraj (ed.). The Oxford Handbook of Iranian History. Oxford University Press. pp. 1–432. ISBN 978-0-19-987575-7.
- Komaroff, Linda (2012). Beyond the Legacy of Genghis Khan. Brill. pp. 1–678. ISBN 9789004243408.
- Melville, Charles (2012). Persian Historiography: A History of Persian Literature. Bloomsbury Publishing. pp. 1–784. ISBN 9780857723598.
- Morton, A. H. (2001). "The Letters of Rashīd al-Dīn: Ilkhānid Fact or Timurid Fiction?". The Mongol Empire and Its Legacy: 155–199. doi:10.1163/9789004492738_013. ISBN 9789004492738.
