= Ghiyath al-Din Muhammad (vizier) =

Persian bureaucrat under the Ilkhanids

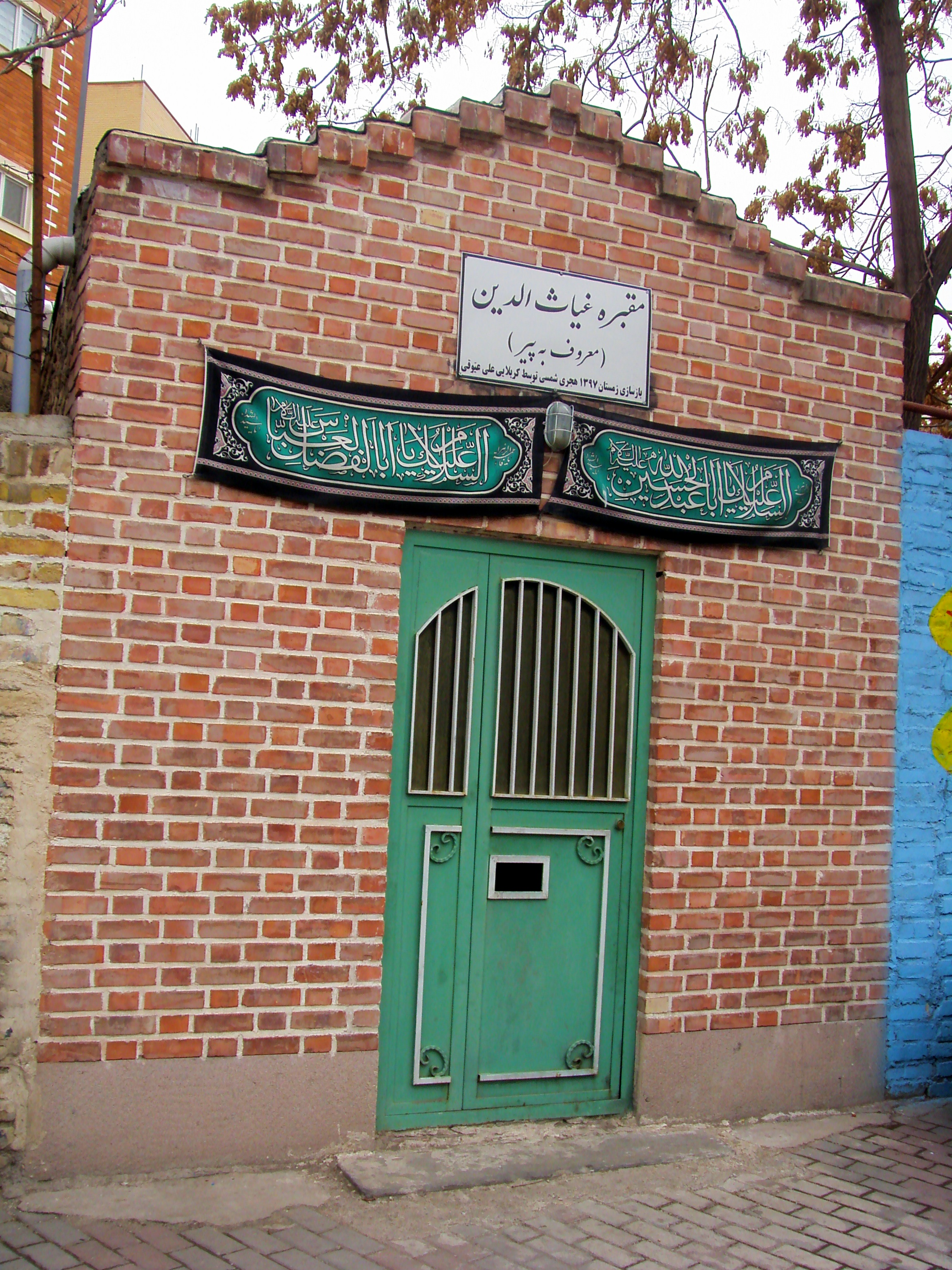
GhiyathalDin Tomb, Tabriz, Iran

Ghiyath al-Din Muhammad ibn Rashid al-Din Fadlallah (died 1336) was a Persian bureaucrat under the Ilkhanate, who served as the vizier of the last Ilkhan, Abu Sa'id Bahadur Khan (r. 1316–1335) from 1327 to 1335. Ghiyath al-Din was the son of Rashid al-Din Hamadani (executed in 1318), the distinguished historian and vizier of the Ilkhans Ghazan Khan (r. 1295–1304) and Öljaitü (r. 1304–1316).

Ghiyath al-Din was notably a patron of arts. In the 1330's, various works were dedicated to him by prominent figures such as the poets Awhadi Maraghai, Khwaju Kermani, and Salman Savaji; scholars such as Adud al-Din al-Iji and historians such as Hamdallah Mustawfi and Shabankara'i.

== Sources ==
- Jackson, Peter; Melville, Charles (2001). "Ḡīāt-al-Dīn Moḥammad". In Yarshater, Ehsan (ed.). Encyclopædia Iranica. Vol. X/6: Germany VI–Gindaros. London and New York: Routledge & Kegan Paul. pp. 598–599. ISBN 978-0-933273-55-9.
- Jackson, Peter (2017). The Mongols and the Islamic World: From Conquest to Conversion. Yale University Press. ISBN 9780300227284. JSTOR 10.3366/j.ctt1n2tvq0. (registration required)
- Hope, Michael (2016). Power, Politics, and Tradition in the Mongol Empire and the Īlkhānate of Iran. Oxford University Press. ISBN 978-0198768593.
- Komaroff, Linda (2006). Beyond the Legacy of Genghis Khan. Brill. ISBN 978-9004150836.
- Lane, George E. (2012). "The Mongols in Iran". In Daryaee, Touraj (ed.). The Oxford Handbook of Iranian History. Oxford University Press. pp. 243–270. ISBN 978-0-19-987575-7.
