= Hazaraspids =

Kurdish ruling dynasty, atabegs of Luristan

Atābag of Great Lorestān ئەتابەگی ڵۆڕی گەورە اتابگی لٛۏری بزرگ
- 1115–1424
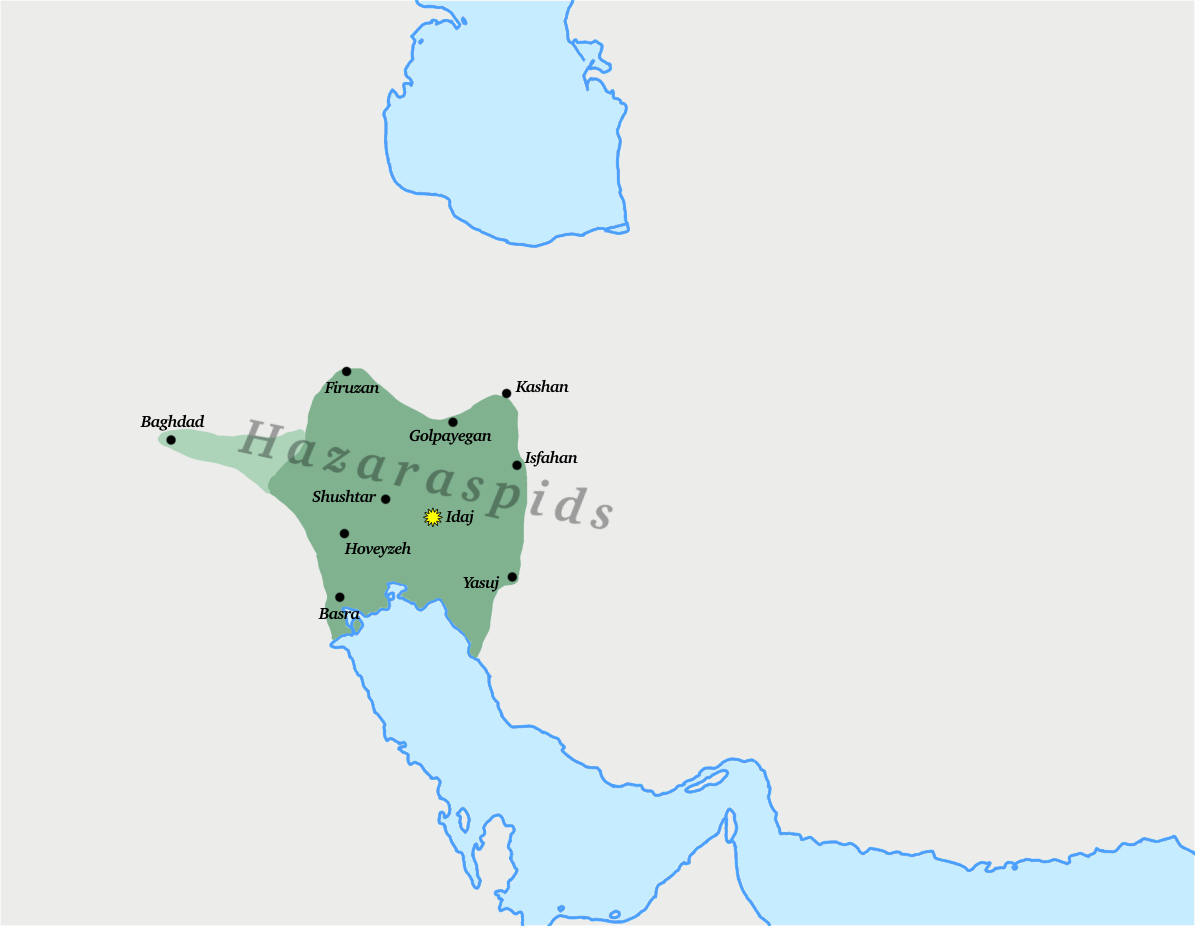
- All lands ever conquered by the Hazaraspids
- Status: Vassal of the Ilkhanate (1256–1335) Vassal of Timurid Empire (1393-1424)
- Capital: Idaj
- Common languages: Kurdish, Luri
- Religion: Sunni Islam
- Government: Monarchy
- Atabeg/Malik/Shah
- History
  - Established: 1115
  - Hazaraspids overthrown by Timurids: 1424
Preceded by	Succeeded by
Salghurids; Shabankara	Timurid Empire

The Hazaraspids also known as Fadluyids or Fadlawi, Fazlavi dynasty(1115–1424) were a Kurdish Sunni Muslim dynasty that ruled the Zagros Mountains region of southwestern Iran, essentially in Lorestan and which flourished in the later Saljuq, Ilkhanid, Muzaffarid, and Timurid periods.

The Hazaraspids were neighbours of the Khorshidi dynasty, who ruled over lesser Lorestan. While the Hazaraspids were more politically important due to their vast territory, and the fact that they held major communications routes.

== Etymology ==
Although the founder was Abu Tahir ibn Muhammad, the dynasty is named after the latter's son and successor, Malik Hazarasp. The name of the dynasty is of Persian origin, and means "thousand horses". (Note: "HAZARASP (Persian: "a thousand horses")..") the dynasty used the surname Fażlūya (Fażlawayh), hence why in some sources they're referred to as Fadluyid dynasty or Fazlawayhids.

The official name of the kingdom was Atābakān-e Lor-e Bozorg, or Atābagān-e Lor-e Bozorg, (Persian: اتابکان لور بزرگ; Kurdish: ھەزارئەسپ, ئەتابەگەکانی لوڕی مەزن; lit. 'Atābagate of Greater Lorestān').

== History ==
=== Origins ===
The Hazaraspids were descendant of a Kurdish tribal chief in Syria, Fadlawi. Fadlawi along with his tribe migrated from Syria to Luristan and Khuzestan, passing Mayyafariqin and Adharbayjan on his way. While in Adharbayjan, he made an alliance with the Gilan ruler. In 1006, Fadlawi reached northern Luristan, where Abu Tahir, his 9th descendant, established himself as an independent ruler of Luristan. The Hazaraspid princes appeared to have belonged to the Bakhtiari, one of the four branches of the Lurs, who had absorbed earlier waves of migrants.

=== Atabagate of Greater Luristan ===
Abu Tahir, who was initially a commander of the Salghurids of Fars and was appointed as the governor of Kuhgiluya, but eventually gained independence in Luristan and extended his realm as far as Isfahan and assumed the prestigious title of atabeg. His son, Malik Hazarasp fought a successful campaign against Salghurids and assisted Jalal-al-din Khwarezmshah in his struggle against the Mongols. Another Hazaraspid ruler Takla, accompanied Hulagu on his march to Baghdad, but deserted because of the murder of the last caliph. He was eventually caught and executed on Hulagu's order.

Yusuf Shah I received Ilkhan Abaqa's confirmation of his rule and added Khuzestan, Kuhgiluya, Firuzan (near Isfahan) and Golpayegan to his domain. Afrasiab I attempted to extend his control to the coast of Persian Gulf but faced stiff opposition from the Mongols who defeated his army at Kuhrud near Kashan. He was reinstated by Ilkhan Gaykhatu but was executed by Gazan in October 1296.

The capital of Hazaraspids was located at Idaj located in present-day northern Khuzestan. Yusuf Shah II annexed the cities of Shushtar, Hoveizeh and Basra in the first half of fourteenth century. During the reign of Shams-al-din Pashang, the dynasty faced attacks from the Muzaffarids and the capital Idaj temporarily fell into their hands, until the occupiers had to retreat due to their own internecine fighting.

In 1424, the Timurid ruler Shahrukh Mirza overthrew the last Hazaraspid ruler Ghiyath al-Din thereby ended the dynasty. Maintaining their rule throughout the Seljuk, Mongol and somewhat into the Timurid era, the Hazaraspids played a part in the preservation of the Iranian. identity during foreign rule.

== Population ==
The Hazaraspid domain had a mixed population of Kurds and Lurs.

== Rulers ==
1. Abu Tahir ibn Ali ibn Muhammad (r. 1115–1153)
2. Yusuf Shah I (r. 1023–1153)
3. Malik Hazarasp (r. 1204–1248)
4. Imad al-Din ibn Hazarasp (r. 1248–1251)
5. Nusrat al-Din (r. 1252–1257)
6. Takla (r. 1257–1259)
7. Shams al-Din Alp Arghun (r. 1259-1274)
8. Yusuf Shah I (r. 1274–1288)
9. Afrasiab I (r. 1288–1296)
10. Nusrat al-Din Ahmad (r. 1296–1330)
11. Rukn al-Din Yusuf Shah II (r. 1330–1340)
12. Muzaffar al-Din Afrasiab II (r. 1340–1355)
13. Shams al-Din Pashang (r. 1355–1378)
14. Malik Pir Ahmad (r. 1378–1408)
15. Abu Sa'id (r. 1408–1417)
16. Shah Husayn (r. 1417–1424)
17. Ghiyath al-Din (r. 1424)

== See also ==
- List of Kurdish dynasties and countries
- Khorshidi dynasty

== Sources ==
- Luzac; Co (1986). "The Encyclopedia of Islam". The Encyclopaedia of Islam, Vol. III. London: E.J. Brill. pp. 1–1304.
- Spuler, B. (1971). "Hazāraspids". In Lewis, B.; Ménage, V. L.; Pellat, Ch. & Schacht, J. (eds.). The Encyclopaedia of Islam, Second Edition. Volume III: H–Iram. Leiden: E. J. Brill. OCLC 495469525.
- Minorsky, V. (1986). "Lur-i Buzurg". In Bosworth, C. E.; van Donzel, E.; Lewis, B. & Pellat, Ch. (eds.). The Encyclopaedia of Islam, Second Edition. Volume V: Khe–Mahi. Leiden: E. J. Brill. pp. 46–48. ISBN 978-90-04-07819-2.
- Spuler, B. (1987). "Atābakān-e Lorestān". In Yarshater, Ehsan (ed.). Encyclopædia Iranica. Vol. II/8: Aśoka IV–Āṯār al-Wozarāʾ. London and New York: Routledge & Kegan Paul. pp. 896–898. ISBN 978-0-71009-108-6.
