= Siege of Maymun-Diz =

Mongol siege against the Nizari fortress of Maymun-Diz (1256)

- Part of the Mongol campaign against the Nizaris
Date	8–23 November 1256 (15 days)
Location	Maymun-Diz (exact location disputed), Rudbar of Alamut
Result	Mongol victory: The Nizari leadership capitulated; Maymun-Diz and most other Nizari fortresses capitulated and were demolished

Belligerents
Mongol Empire; Golden Horde; Chagatai Khanate; Oirats; Supported by: The local rulers of Anatolia, Tabaristan, Fars, Iraq, Azerbaijan, Arran, Shirvan, Georgia, and Armenia	Nizari state of Alamut

Commanders and leaders
Hülegü; Kitbuqa; (Chagatai Khanate) Tegüder; (Chagatai Khanate) Buqa Temür; Köke Ilgei; Guo Kan; Quli; Balagha; Tutar; Abaqa; Yoshmut; Arghun Aqa	Imam Rukn al-Din Khurshah (surrendered); Khwaja Nasir al-Din Tusi (surrendered)

Strength
80,000 men: 1,000 squads of north Chinese and Muslim siege engineers	Heavily outnumbered and outgunned

The siege of Maymun-Diz, an unlocated fortress and the stronghold of the leader of the Nizari Ismaili state, Imam Rukn al-Din Khurshah, occurred in 1256, during the Mongol campaign against the Nizaris led by Hülegü.

The new Nizari Imam was already engaged in negotiations with Hülegü as he was advancing toward his stronghold. The Mongols insisted that all Nizari fortresses be dismantled, but the Imam tried to negotiate a compromise. After several days of fighting, the Imam and his family capitulated and were received well by Hülegü. Maymun-Diz was demolished, and the Imam ordered his subordinates to surrender and demolish their fortresses likewise. The subsequent capitulation of the symbolic stronghold of Alamut marked the end of the Nizari state in Persia.

== Sources ==
The siege is described in detail in the Tarikh-i Jahangushay written by Ata-Malik Juvayni, a Persian historian and official who was a participant in the siege. It is also narrated in Rashid al-Din Hamadani's Jami' al-Tawarikh.

The Chinese work History of Yuan has conflated the siege of Maymun-Diz with that of Girdkuh. In the narration, it mostly focuses on the performance of the Chinese general Guo Kan who allegedly devised a new siege engine to attack the unusual fortification of Maymun-Diz.

== Background ==
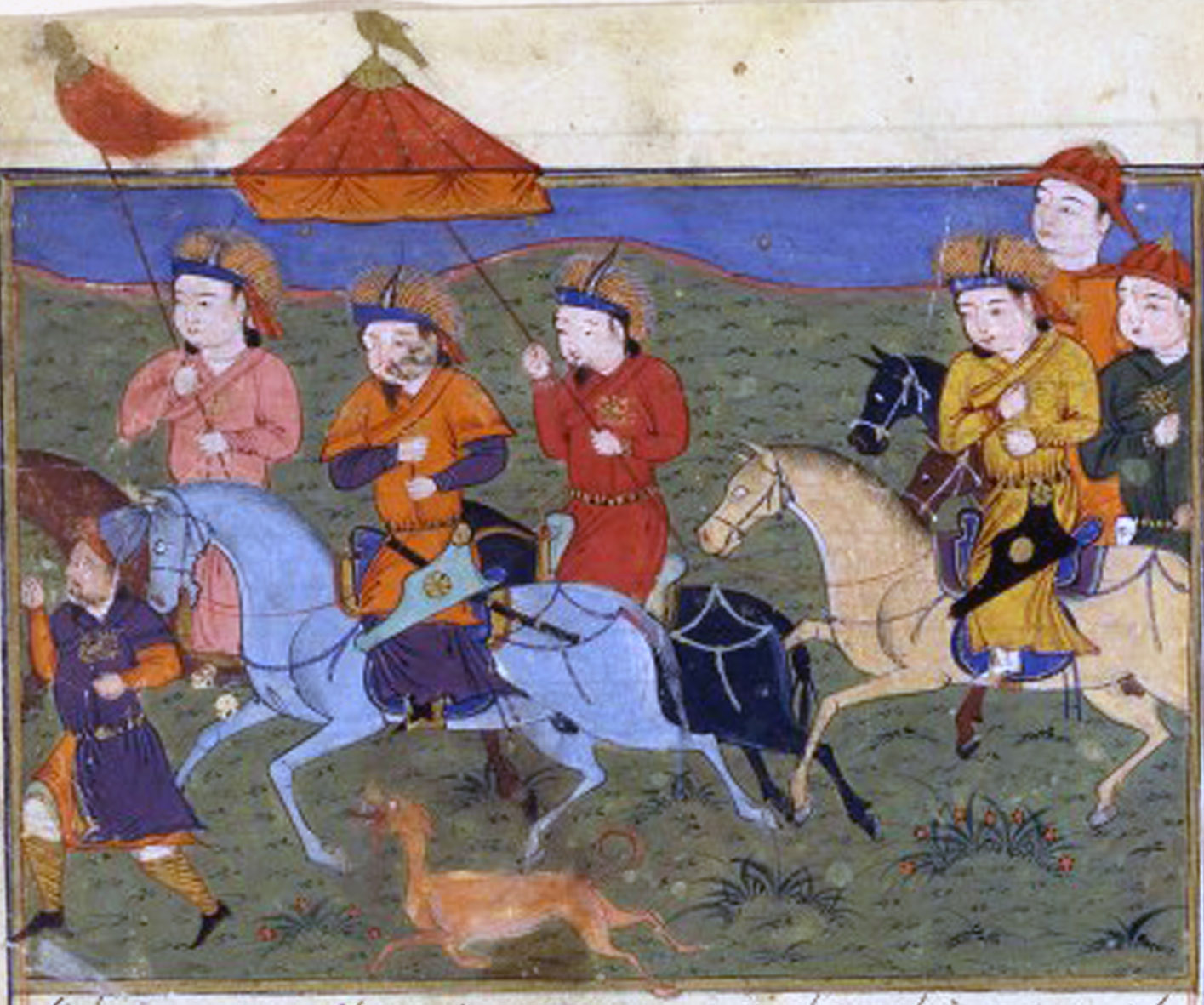
Hulegu and his army marching against the Nizari castles in 1256. Persian miniature from a manuscript of the Jami al-Tawarikh

Khurshah had announced his willingness to submit to the Mongol rule to the nearest Mongol commander, the noyan Yasur in Qazvin. Yasur replied that he should visit Hülegü's camp personally. Yasur later engaged in fighting against the Nizaris of Rudbar: on June 12, he was defeated in a battle on Mount Siyalan near Alamut, where the Nizari forces had been mustered. He then began a campaign of harassment against the Nizaris of Rudbar.

As Hülegü reached Bistam, his army had enlarged into five tümens, and new commanders were added. Many of them were the relatives of Batu Khan. From the ulus of Jochi representing the Golden Horde came Quli (son of Orda), Balagha, and Tutar. The Chagatai Khanate forces were under the prince Tegüder. A contingent of Oirat tribesmen also joined under Buqa Temür. No member of Ögedei's family is mentioned. Hülegü had with him a thousand squads of siege engineers (probably north Chinese, Khitan and Muslim) skilled in the use of mangonels and naphtha.

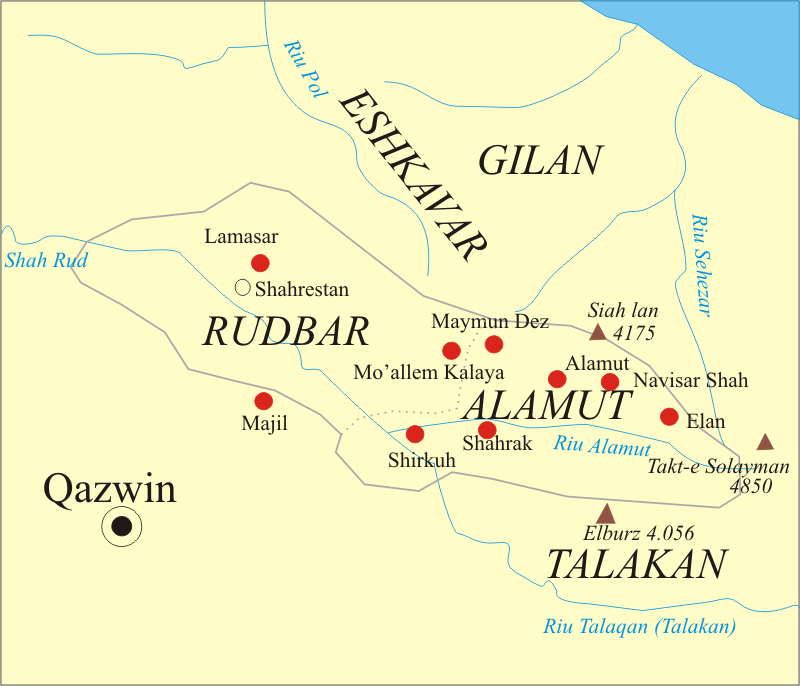
The Nizari heartland: the regions Alamut and Rudbar

The Mongols campaigned against the Nizari heartland of Alamut and Rudbar from three directions. The right wing, under Buqa Temür and Köke Ilgei, marched via Tabaristan. The left wing, under Tegüder and Kitbuqa, marched via Khuwar and Semnan. The center was under Hülegü himself. Meanwhile, Hülegü sent another warning to Khurshah. Khurshah was in the Maymun-Diz fortress and was apparently playing for time, because by resisting longer, the arrival of winter could have stopped the Mongols whose military was dependant on available fodder for their horses. Khurshah sent his vizier Kayqubad who met the Mongols in Firuzkuh and offered the surrender of all strongholds except Alamut and Lambsar, and again asked for a year's delay for Khurshah to visit Hülegü in person. Meanwhile, as a show of good faith, Khurshah ordered Gerdkuh and the fortresses of Quhistan to surrender, which their chiefs did, but the garrison of Gerdkuh continued to resist. The Mongols continued to advance and reached Lar, Damavand, and Shahdiz. Khurshah sent his 7- or 8-years-old son as a show of good faith, but he was sent back due to his young age. Khurshah then sent his second brother Shahanshah (Shahin Shah) who met Hülegü in Ray. However, Hülegü demanded from Khurshah the dismantling of all of the Nizari fortresses to show his goodwill. Apparently, the Nizari Imam sought to at least keep the main Nizari strongholds, while the Mongols insisted on full submission.

== The siege ==
On 8 November 1256, Hülegü set his camp on a hilltop facing Maymun-Diz and encircled the fortress with his forces by marching over the Alamut mountains via Taleqan valley and appearing at the foot of Maymun-Diz. Teams of hand-picked Mongol fighters were distributed at around 250 meters (820 ft) intervals from the hilltop down to the valley.

Maymun-Diz could have been attacked by mangonels; this was not the case with Alamut, Nevisar Shah, Lambsar and Gerdkuh, all of which were on top of high peaks. Nevertheless, the strength of the fortification impressed the Mongols, who surveyed them from various angles to find a weak point. The majority of the Mongol officers advised Hülegü to postpone the siege, but he decided to proceed, as advised by Kitbuqa.

Preliminary bombardments were performed for three days by mangonels from a nearby hilltop with casualties on both sides. According to Daftary, on the first day, the Nizaris gained some victories by throwing stones using their mangonels, but on the second day, the Mongols used a Chinese-type ballista (Persian: کمان گاو kaman-i gav) with a range of 2,500 paces, after which the garrison of Maymun-Diz ceased fighting and asked for a truce, which was accepted by the Mongols. A direct Mongol assault on the fourth day was repulsed. The Mongols then used heavier siege engines hurling javelins dipped in burning pitch and set up additional mangonels all around the fortifications.

Khurshah sent a message offering his surrender on the condition of the immunity of him and his family. Ata-Malik Juvayni personally brought Hülegü's jarlig (royal decree) to Khurshah to receive his signature, but Khurshah was hesitant. After several days, Hülegü began another round of bombardment and on November 19, Khurshah and his entourage descended from the fortress and capitulated. The full evacuation of the fortress continued until the next day. A small part of the garrison refused to leave the stronghold and fought in a last stand in the "qubba" (literally "domed structure"), supposedly a high domed building in the fortress; they were defeated and killed after three days.

According to the History of Yuan, the Chinese general Guo Kan attacked the fortress by "catapults on mounts" (jiapao). "General Khwaja Nasir" (the scholar Nasir al-Din al-Tusi) then opened the gate and surrendered. The Nizaris' leadership decision to surrender was apparently influenced by al-Tusi and other outside scholars. He later entered Hulegu's entourage.

An inexplicable aspect of the events for historians is that why the forces at Alamut made no effort to assist their besieged comrades in Maymun-Diz.

== Aftermath ==
The subsequent capitulation of the garrison of Alamut Castle, also outnumbered but well-provisioned, marked the official end of the Nizari state in Persia.
