= Khuwar =

Khuwar or Khuvar may be:

- an alternative spelling of Khowar, a language of Pakistan
- medieval city in Qumis, probably related to the ancient town Choara, Media

== See also ==
- Khovar
- Khwar (disambiguation)
- Khavar (disambiguation)
