= Khavar =

Khavar may refer to:

== Places in Iran ==
- Khavar Shahr
- Khavar-e Pain
- Khavar-e Seyyed Khalaf

== Other uses ==
- Kabar, a Turkic ethnic group
- Khavar (newspaper), an Iranian newspaper

== See also ==
- Khwar (disambiguation)
- Khuwar (disambiguation)
