= Nour News =

Iranian state-linked media outlet

- Type: News agency
- Founded: 2019
- Headquarters: Iran
- Key people: Maryam Salimi (managing director)
- Website: nournews.ir

Nour News (Persian: نورنیوز) is an Iranian state-linked news agency affiliated to the Supreme National Security Council. Founded in 2019, the outlet is owned by the Salek Noor Cultural and Artistic Institute. The managing director is journalist Maryam Salimi.

Nour News publishes in multiple languages including Persian, Arabic, English and Hebrew. Iran International described the outlet during the tenure of Supreme National Security Council chief Ali Shamkhani as "usually reflecting" his views.
