= Khavari =

Khavari (Persian: خاوری; adjective form of Khavar (خاور (xâvar)) – meaning "east" – thus literally "eastern", "oriental") is a Dari and Persian surname.
Notable people with the surname include:

- ʻAbdu'l-Hamíd Ishráq-Khávari (1902–1972), Iranian scholar of the Baháʼí Faith
- Ali Khavari (1923–2021), Iranian politician
- Farid Khavari (born 1943), Iranian American economist, author, patent-holder, designer and small business owner.
- Kathreen Khavari (born 1983), American actress
- Mahmoud Reza Khavari (born 1952), Iranian former banker
