= Guo Ziyi =

Tang Chinese general and politician (697–781)

- Duke of Dai 代國公; Prince of Fenyang 汾陽王
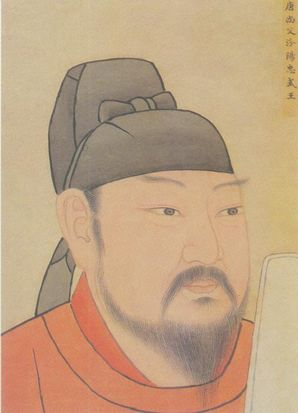
- Qing dynasty portrait of Guo Ziyi
- Born: 697
- Died: July 9, 781 (age 83–84)
- Issue: 8 sons, including Guo Ai (郭曖), father of Empress Dowager Guo
Posthumous name
- Zhongwu 忠武
- Father: Guo Jingzi (郭敬之)
- Occupation: Military general, politician

Guo Ziyi (Kuo Tzu-i; Traditional Chinese: 郭子儀, Simplified Chinese: 郭子仪, Hanyu Pinyin: Guō Zǐyí, Wade-Giles: Kuo^{1} Tzu^{3}-i^{2}) (697 – July 9, 781), posthumously Prince Zhongwu of Fenyang (汾陽忠武王), was a Chinese military general and politician who ended the An Lushan rebellion and participated in expeditions against the Uyghur Khaganate and Tibetan Empire. He was regarded as one of the most powerful Tang generals before and after the Anshi Rebellion. After his death he was deified in Chinese folk religion as the God of Wealth and Happiness (Lu Star of Fu Lu Shou). Guo Ziyi is depicted in the Wu Shuang Pu (無雙譜, Table of Peerless Heroes) by Jin Guliang.

== Family ==
Parents

- Mother: Unknown
- Father: Guo Jingzi (郭敬之)

Wife and concubines

- Lady Wang (王氏), legal wife
  - Guo Xi (郭晞; 733–794), third son
  - Guo Wu (郭晤), fifth son
  - Guo Ai (郭曖), sixth son
  - Guo Shu (郭曙), seventh son
  - Guo Ying (郭映), eighth son
- Lady Zhang (张氏), concubine
- Lady Li (李氏), concubine
- Unknown:
  - Guo Yao (郭曜), first son
  - Guo Gan (郭旰), second son
  - Guo Po (郭昢), fourth son
  - Eight Daughters

== Early life ==
Guo Ziyi was born into the family of a middle-class civil servant in Hua Prefecture (華州, present-day Hua County in Shaanxi), he was described as a handsome man and was over 1.9 meters tall.

Around 735 Guo Ziyi was saved from a court martial by the poet Li Bai, who intervened on his behalf with the local commander.

Unlike other members of his family, Guo Ziyi entered political life through the official military examinations instead of a literary exam (for civil servants). He passed the military examinations in 749 and became an officer in the border regions of the Tang Empire and quickly rose through the ranks to become a jiedushi (regional military governor).

== An Shi Rebellion ==
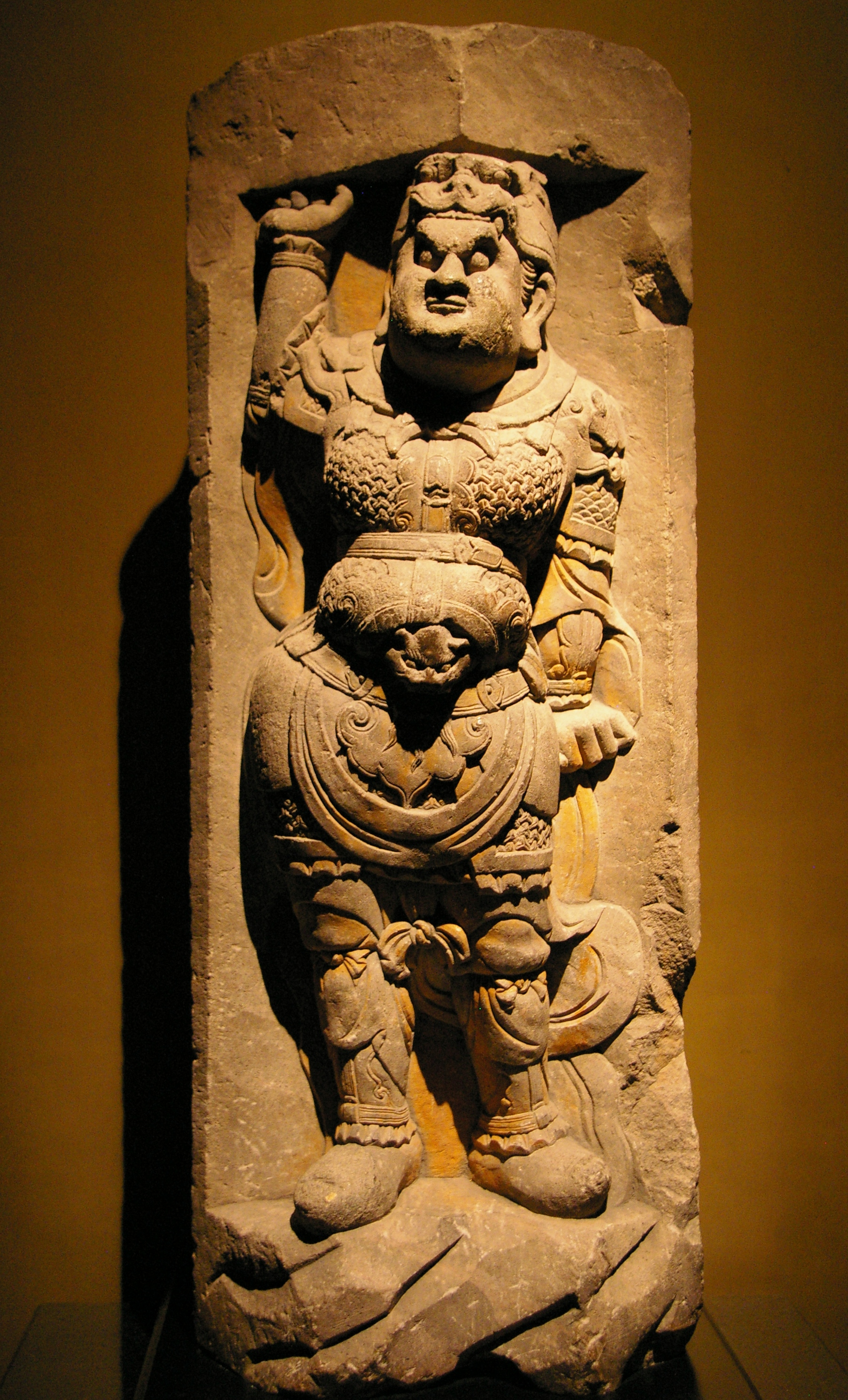
Tang stone relief of a warrior wearing mountain pattern armour

=== First victories ===
Limited records exist about Guo Ziyi before the An Lushan Rebellion; it was during the rebellion that he earned his fame. When rebellion broke out in 755, Guo Ziyi was assigned to protect the Tong Pass, a strategic location on the Chinese frontier. A large force of ten thousand rebels were marching toward the pass. Guo Ziyi took advantage of the situation by luring the rebels onto the plains in front of the pass where there were only scarce settlements. The rebels saw little to loot and were discouraged, while the Tang troops were prepared to fight, motivated by the desire to protect their families in the Tong Pass and the capital of Chang'an. Guo engaged the seven thousand troops at the Battle of Qingbi and scattered the rest while suffering few casualties to his own force, winning his first victory.

By the following year of 756 the capital fell due to the ineptitude and corruption of the chancellor Yang Guozhong and his eunuchs. Emperor Xuanzong of Tang fled the city, accompanied by his personal guard and members of the Yang family, including his consort Yang Guifei. Members of the entourage, including the troops, resented Yang Guozhong, holding him responsible for the failed strategy that led to the fall of Chang'an. Yang Guozhong was denounced and executed. Following this, the emperor's own troops also forced him to execute his beloved consort Yang Guifei. The emperor then fled with the remainder of the entourage under difficult conditions to Chengdu in Jiannan.

Meanwhile, Guo Ziyi confronted a great force of a hundred thousand led by rebel commander Shi Siming. Although Guo had only ten thousand men he delayed Shi Siming's army until reinforcements could arrive. Shi Siming was tricked into thinking he would be ambushed if he moved against Guo and was delayed forty days. At that point commander Li Guangbi came to Guo's relief with ninety thousand men. The opposing forces clashed, resulting in few Tang losses, while the rebels suffered ten thousand casualties. Shi Siming quickly gathered up what was left of his force and retreated back to Fanyang, the rebels' stronghold. Li recommended Guo to Emperor Xuanzong, and Guo quickly asked the emperor for permission to launch an immediate counter-attack to destroy the remaining rebels, but Xuanzong refused him.

=== Change of Emperor and the Shaanxi campaign ===
Xuanzong's son, Li Heng, stayed behind in the city of Lingwu and declared himself emperor on 12 August 756. As Emperor Suzong of Tang, he immediately began organizing a counter-attack against the advancing rebels. From this time on, Xuanzong was known as the "Retired Emperor", and after the retaking of Chang'an from the rebels he returned there, where he lived until his death in 761.

The rebel crisis decreased the power of the Imperial Court. Thus, after assuming power, Suzong's authority was weak and many Tang generals cared little for the emperor's orders. There were few generals of Chinese descent such as Guo Ziyi remaining in the Tang army. Guo was given the post of Imperial Commander and Suzong provided support for his military operations, which were met with great success. By 757, Guo Ziyi had entered the Shaanxi battlefront, and many locals willingly aided him against the rebels, increasing the Guo army to perhaps twice its original size. The rebels suffered dramatic losses, including the deaths of their generals, after which Guo declared victory on the Shaanxi front.

=== Chang'an victory and rebel collapse ===
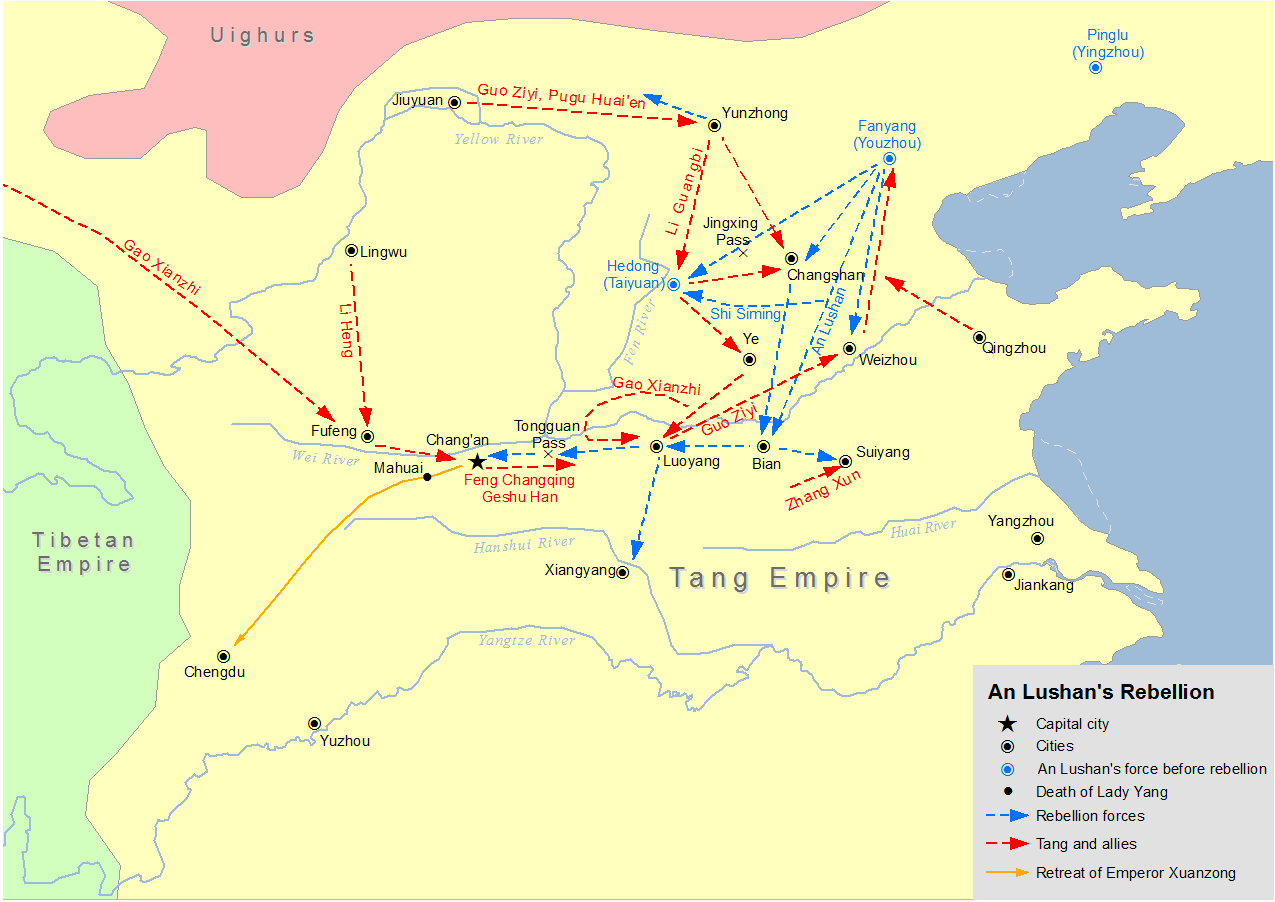
Map of An Lushan Rebellion with the military movement of Guo Ziyi

Guo Ziyi then immediately turned his attention to retaking Chang'an. He attacked with 15,000 men, whereas the rebels were able to assemble only 10,000 men, and defeated them. Guo's victories in Shaanxi and at Chang'an contributed to in-fighting among the rebel ranks. The leader of the rebels, An Lushan, was killed by his son, An Qingxu, who gathered up what was left of the rebels and retreated to Luoyang. When Suzong arrived at Chang'an, it is said that he shed tears and said to Guo, "This may be my country, but it is recreated by your hand." 「雖吾之家國，實由卿再造。」

In 758, Guo Ziyi, Li Guangbi, and other jiedushi were ordered to eliminate the last remaining rebels in Yi. However, Suzong was troubled by the growing power of the jiedushi so he placed his eunuchs in charge of the campaign. This became a disaster, but Guo Ziyi managed to make the best out of the situation by convincing his fellow jiedushi that they could have one easy victory if they laid siege to the rebel city. All of them agreed to this strategy and the rebel's supplies were depleted during the siege. When the time came to assault the city, however, there was no commander-in-chief to coordinate the attack since all the jiedushi were of equal rank, and it proved ineffective. In the meantime, reinforcements under Shi Siming arrived to reinforce An Qingxu. The Tang forces missed the opportunity to eliminate the rebels. A bloody battle followed in 759, fought in poor weather and again with no central command for the Tang. Although the Tang force emerged victorious, both sides suffered tremendous losses and the result of the battle was unacceptable to the emperor, since the Tang army had been known to win battles while suffering relatively few casualties. The jiedushi began to blame one another, and many of them targeted Guo, placing much of the blame on him. In fact, aside from the emperor himself, Guo Ziyi was the only one that the common people were willing to follow. Suzong, worried by Guo's popularity, used this as a pretext to decrease Guo's authority, demoting him while generously rewarding the other jiedushi.

=== Church of the East ===
Church of the East Christians like the Bactrian Priest Yisi of Balkh helped the Tang dynasty general Guo Ziyi militarily crush the An Lushan rebellion, with Yisi personally acting as a military commander and Yisi and the Church of the East were rewarded by the Tang dynasty with titles and positions as described in the Xi'an Stele.

== Under Emperor Suzong ==
Although the An Lushan Rebellion was finally put down in 763, the Tang was immediately confronted by another threat from the Tibetan Empire. Tibet had benefited from the Tang's prosperous period when trade with the Tang was frequent. During the An Lushan Rebellion, it reached the height of its power, and betrayed the peace treaty with the Tang by supporting the rebels. Weakened by the rebellion, Tang border garrisons were unable to resist Tibetan raids into their territory. Most jiedushi were not ethnically Chinese and had little incentive to defend the Tang Empire, especially when it was ruled by a weak emperor. In response, Suzong re-promoted Guo Ziyi, but only as a military figurehead with no authority, in the hope that merely the threat of sending Guo against them would keep the Tibetans at bay. In 762, a general named Wang Yuanzhi murdered Li Jingzhi, the jiedushi of Shaanxi, claiming that the troops were still so loyal to Guo that they demanded he be reinstated as jiedushi. Suzong was forced to return Guo Ziyi to his former position. When Guo Ziyi arrived, however, instead of thanking Wang he condemned the general for his disloyalty in killing his commander. He also pointed out that such an act disrupted the chain of command, which might embolden the Tibetans to attack. General Wang submitted to his mistakes and committed suicide. Guo Ziyi quickly assumed command of the post and the Tibetans ceased their attacks.

== Under Emperor Daizong and Tibetan Invasion ==
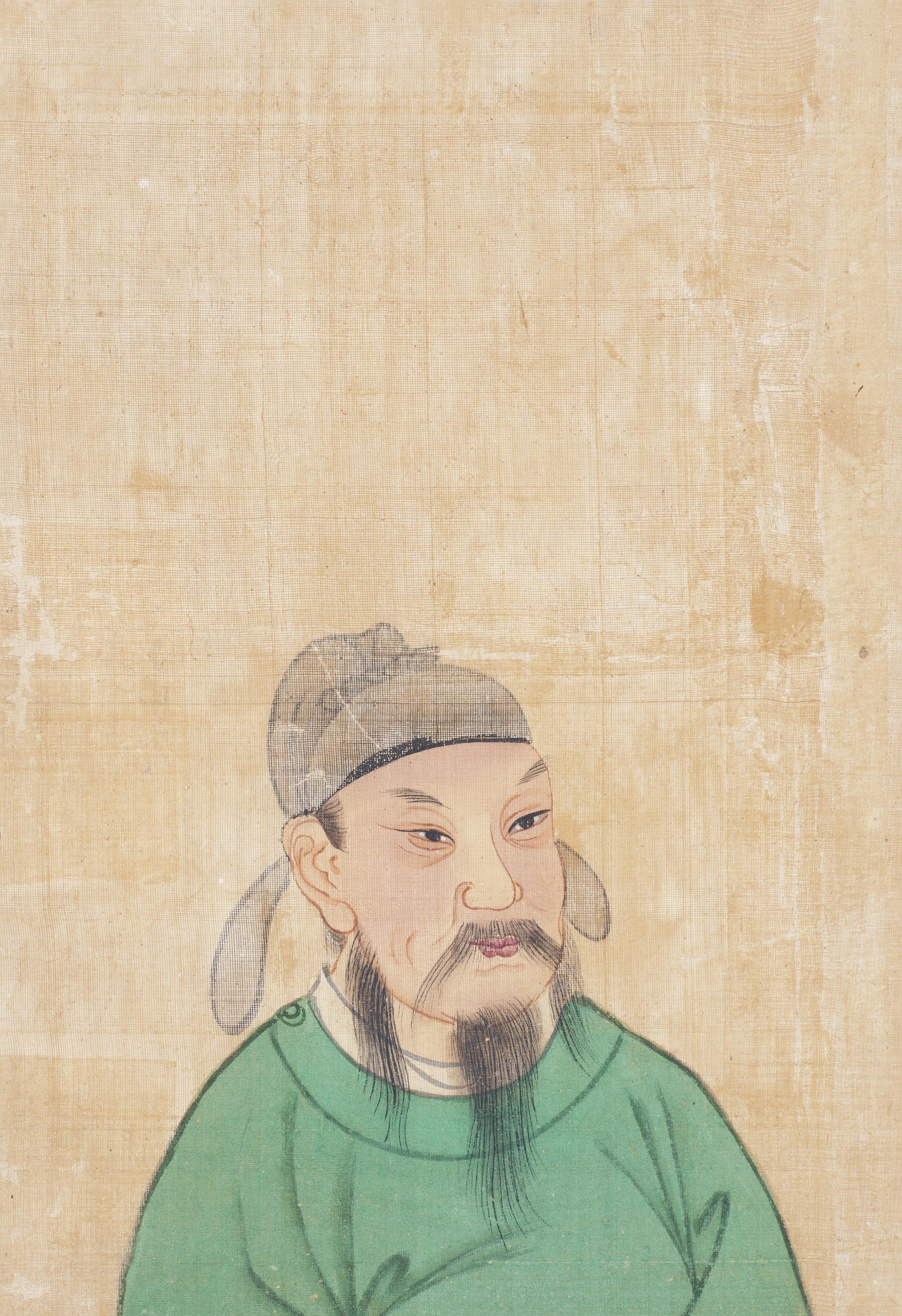
As depicted in the album Portraits of Famous Men c. 1900, housed in the Philadelphia Museum of Art

Not long after, Suzong died and was succeeded by his son Emperor Daizong of Tang. The new emperor was worried about Guo Ziyi's fame and called him back to Chang'an. Guo Ziyi advised the emperor to take a note of the threat posed by the Tibetans, but the emperor largely ignored this.

=== Tibetan invasion of 763 ===
In 763, a force of 100,000 Tibetans invaded the Tang. Daizong fled Chang'an on 16 November when it became clear the city would be captured. The Tibetans crowned Li Chenghong as emperor of Tang in Chang'an, but retreated a month later fearing a Tang army had arrived. In reality Guo ordered cavalry scouts to go forward and light fires, in places where the enemies could see, and then retreat. Guo also sent secret messages to Chang'an, ordering citizens to strike gongs and create fire. The Tibetans, confused by these actions, panicked, scattering when the rumor spread that Guo Ziyi moved against them with a large force. With the Tibetans retreating from their positions, the invasion was concluded without loss to either side. Many Chinese military historians consider this victory to be the best example of Sun Tzu's idea of the cleanest kind of battle, "a war with no loss on either side but simply played out with the desired effect for the victor." There are discrepancies in the number of cavalry Guo dispatched; Chinese sources state that Guo had sent out only 13 scouts, but a Tibetan text indicates there had been 200. Nevertheless, the Tibetan army retreated, and when Guo Ziyi arrived at Chang'an with his "large" force, Daizong appeared to him and stated, "By employing the Elder not sooner: so many deaths reached, woe is this!" 「用卿不早，故及於此。」

=== Tibetan invasion of 764 ===
The Tibetan Empire invaded again in 764 with a force of 70,000 but was repulsed in Jiannan by the jiedushi Yan Wu.

=== Tibetan threat of 765 and the Uyghur alliance ===
The Tibetans attacked again in 765, when the Tiele jiedushi Pugu Huai'en sent false messages to Trisong Detsen, the emperor of Tibet, stating that Guo Ziyi had died. The Tibetan emperor was eager to avenge his earlier defeats, and dispatched a large force to attack Tang China again. Various Uyghur chieftains, also believing that Guo was dead, joined force with the Tibetans. The Tibetan force was recorded as more than 30,000 (including a few thousand Uyghurs), almost the entire Tibetan military at the time. However Pugu died on 27 September, and his army defected to the Tang.

When news of the Tibetan attack reached Emperor Daizong, he dispatched Guo Ziyi to defend the Tang with only few thousand men. When Guo was within a day's march from the enemy, he decided to go alone to see the Uyghur chieftains. His officers and son Guo Xi (郭晞) were so dismayed and panicked by his intention that they would not let go of his horse's reins, declaring such an act would be suicide. Guo laughed and convinced his officers to let him go, but his son would not. Angered, Guo whipped his son's hand so that he released the reins, reprimanding him and telling him that this was a life and death situation for the empire; their force was small and if they fought the Tibetans alone, both father and son, and their troops, would die. If he succeeded in his plan the empire would be defended, but if it failed only his own life would be lost.

When Guo arrived at the Uyghur's camp, he did not reveal his identity and appeared to be a messenger who had been sent to tell them that Guo Ziyi was coming to see them. The Uyghur chieftains, many of whom had joined the rebel side in the An Lushan Rebellion, were surprised and panicked to hear that Guo was alive, deciding that they had to meet with him. Guo laughed at them and asked them why they would want to face Guo Ziyi again after their defeat at his hands during the An Shi Rebellion. The Uyghur chieftains replied they had been told that he was dead, but if they met with him and saw he was alive, they would retreat. Guo, however, insisted that Guo Ziyi did not seek their retreat but instead wanted them to join him against the Tibetans. The Uyghur chieftains, saying they had been deceived by the Tibetans about Guo's death, agreed to break the alliance with them. They even claimed that shamans had foretold that a great man would lead them to victory and that they now believed this man must be Guo, and agreed to join forces with the Tang.

=== Battle of Xiyuan ===
Guo returned to his camp and ordered a thousand light horsemen to make a quick rush at the Tibetan camp at Xiyuan. When the Tibetans realized the Uyghurs had broken their alliance, they attempted to withdraw, but Guo's horsemen arrived and scattered their forces; at the same time, Guo's Uyghur allies arrived and prevented the Tibetans' retreat. Over 10,000 Tibetans were killed in battle and another 10,000 were taken prisoner. Guo continued to pursue the Tibetans and freed over 4000 Tang subjects they had taken captive.

When the emperor of Tibet heard that his force had been defeated, he quickly sent a message to Emperor Daizong seeking a peace, stating that his army had been on a hunting trip and had had no intention of attacking the Tang Empire. Although Daizong did not believe this, he agreed to the peace and Tibet was never again a threat to China.

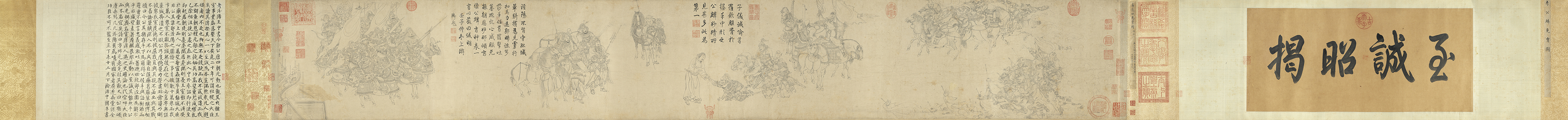
Guo Ziyi accepting the surrender of the Uyghurs in a Northern Song painting by Li Gonglin (李公麟, 1049–1106)

== Later life, death and posthumous honor ==
Guo was later made the Prince of Fenyang (汾陽郡王), and is hence often referred to as "Guo Fenyang". He lived to the age of 85 (by East Asian reckoning) and was given the posthumous name of Zhongwu (忠武: "Loyal and Martial") after his death.

There is a commonly remembered tale dated to the year 767 in which his son had an argument with his wife, a princess of Tang. During the argument, the princess and Guo's son compared their fathers, Emperor Daizong and Guo Ziyi. Guo's son was purported to have said, "What is so great about being an emperor? My father could become emperor at any time if he wanted to." Guo was so angry at his son for implying such an idea of disloyalty that he had him locked up and waited for Emperor Daizong to pass judgement on him. The princess regretted what had happened and asked Guo to forgive his son, but Guo refused. When Emperor Daizong arrived, he pardoned the son and said to Guo, "When the son and daughter fight, it is better as old men to pretend to be deaf." ("不痴不聾，不作家翁。兒女子閨房之言，何足聽也！")

In another instance, the son hit his wife in a drunken rage. Again Guo was so angry at his son that he had him arrested again. But again the princess begged for her husband to be forgiven, and again Emperor Daizong stepped in and forgave his son-in-law. This story of Guo's son and the princess was popularized by the rather literally titled Beijing Opera "Hitting the Princess While Drunk" (醉打金枝).

Popular folklore states that the Jade Emperor was so pleased with Guo's actions in defending the nation and in giving happiness to the people that he sent a heavenly official down from heaven to ask Guo what his greatest desire was. Guo replied that he had fought for so long and had seen so much bloodshed that all he desired was peace and happiness. As a reward, the Jade Emperor had Guo guided to heaven and bestowed the Celestial post of "God of Prosperity and Happiness" to him.

== Legacy ==
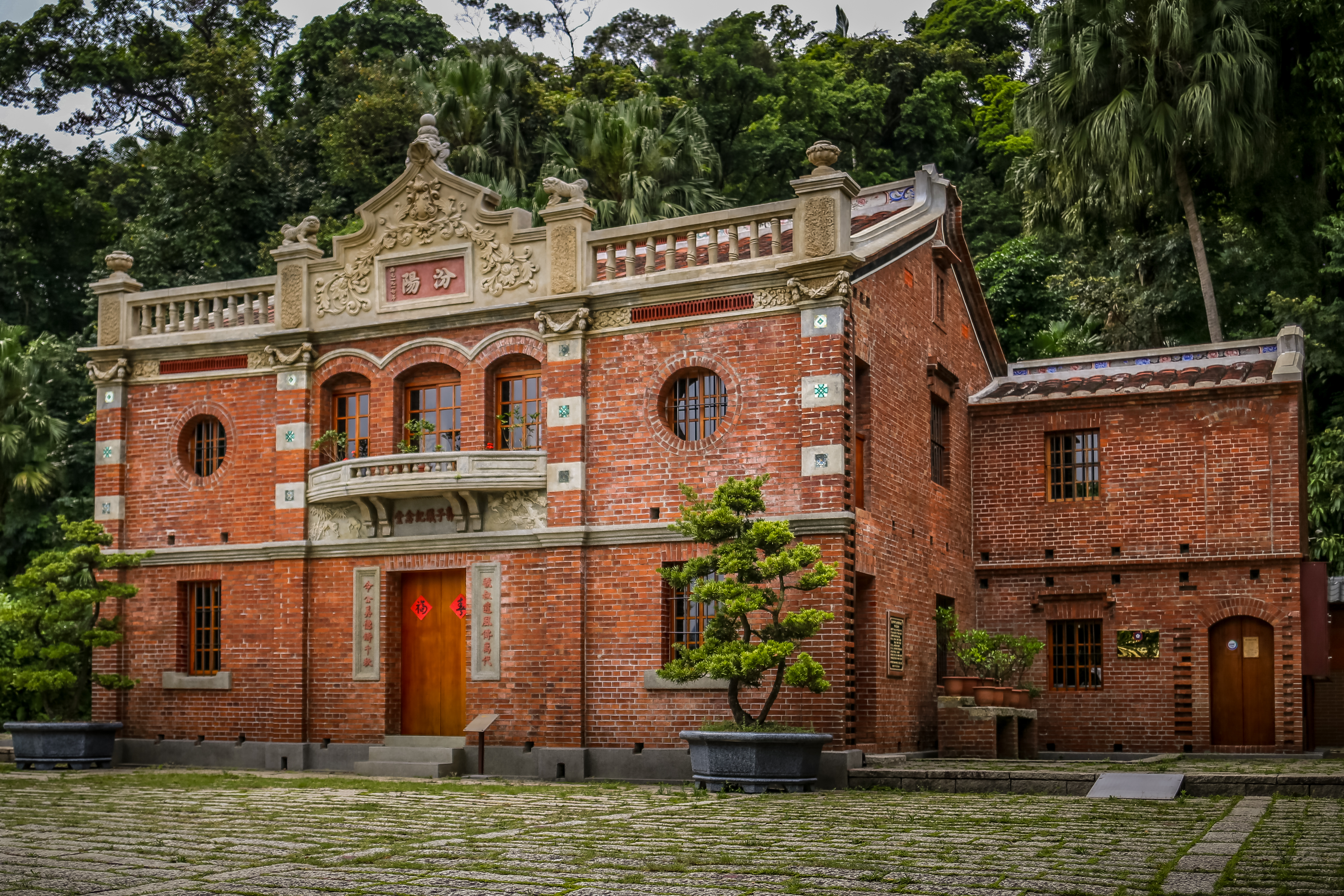
Guo Ziyi Memorial Hall in Taipei, Taiwan.

Guo Ziyi has been credited by many historians with putting down the An Lushan Rebellion, characterizing him as the man who single-handedly saved the Tang dynasty. His impact on East Asia was also dramatic in that he renewed Tang relations with many of its Uyghur allies, who later supported the dynasty in campaigns against the Tibetan Empire. After his various victories over the Tibetans they were never able to restore their military might and lost much of their political strength in Asia.

In 757, or thereabouts, Guo Ziyi saved the renowned poet Li Bai from a death sentence for treason by offering Emperor Suzong of Tang his own official rank in exchange for Li Bai's life. In the event, Suzong commuted Li Bai's sentence to exile, and later pardoned him, and Guo Ziyi was allowed to retain his rank.

Future members of his family would also go to become famous generals, among them Guo Puyo, a general greatly used by Genghis Khan, and Guo Kan, one of the best generals of the Mongol Empire, who was instrumental in the Mongol Siege of Baghdad (1258) and the destruction of the Abbasid caliphate which saw the execution of the last Abbasid caliph and the slaughter of 800,000–2,000,000 Arab Muslim civilians in Baghdad, with only the Church of the East Christians being spared.

=== In art ===
Artistic depictions of banquets and birthday celebrations held for Guo Ziyi were common in the Qing dynasty in China and Joseon dynasty in Korea, especially on folding screens.

The Arrival of a Delegation and Festivities in Honor of the Tang General Guo Ziyi, folding screen, Coromandel lacquer, China, Qing dynasty (Musée des Beaux-Arts de Dijon)

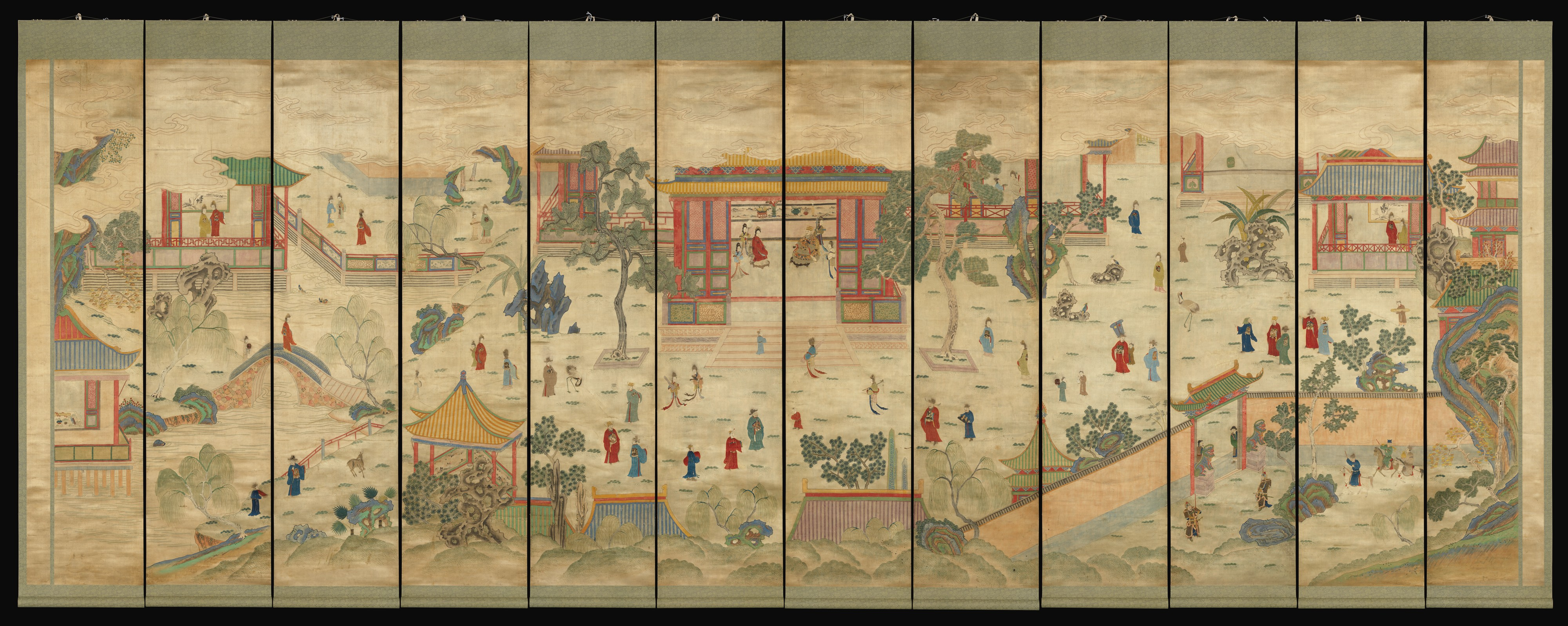
Set of 12 hanging silk scroll paintings believed to depict Guo Ziyi, China, Qing dynasty (Metropolitan Museum of Art)

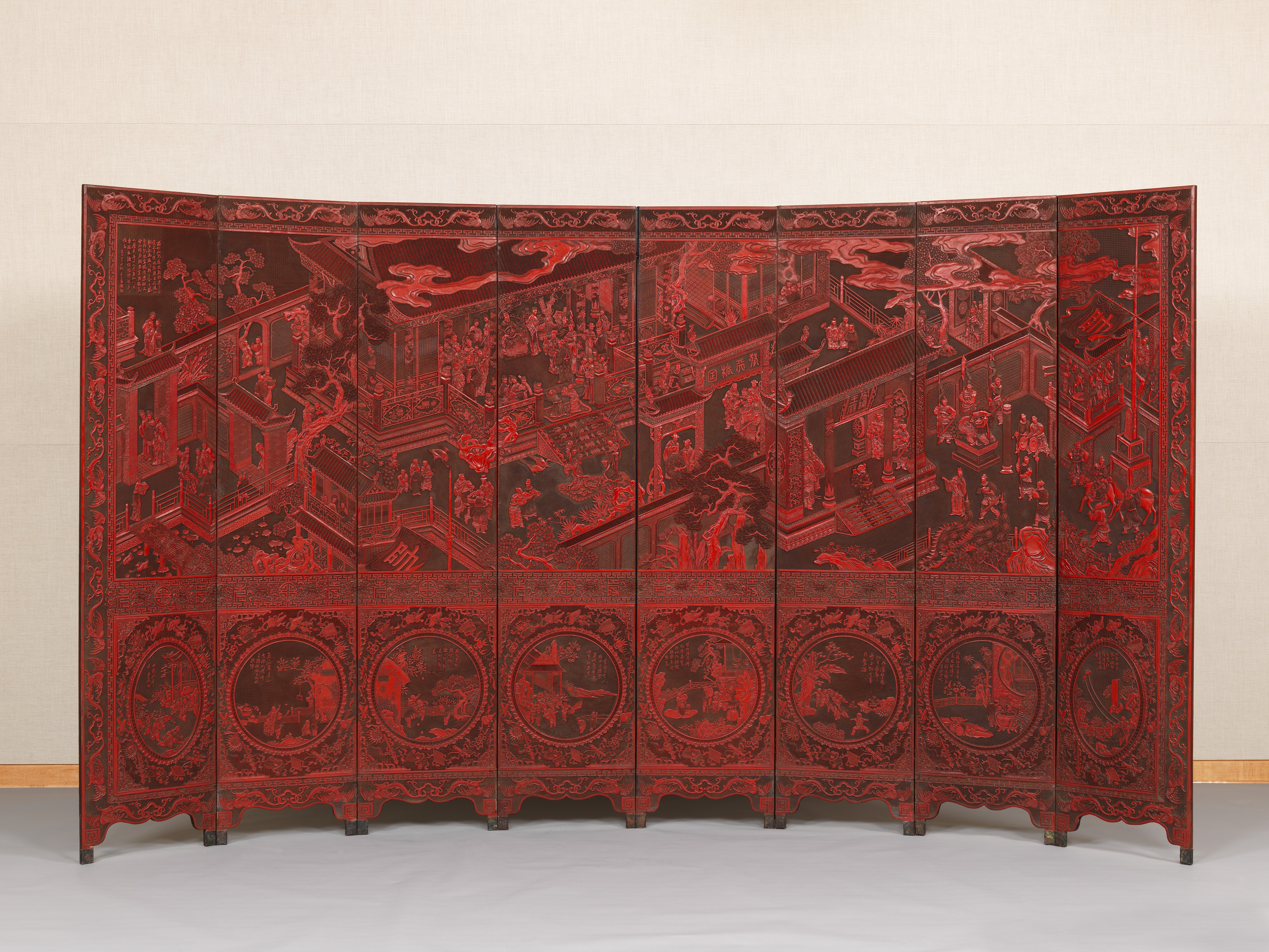
Folding screen with birthday celebration for Guo Ziyi, China, Qing dynasty (Metropolitan Museum of Art)

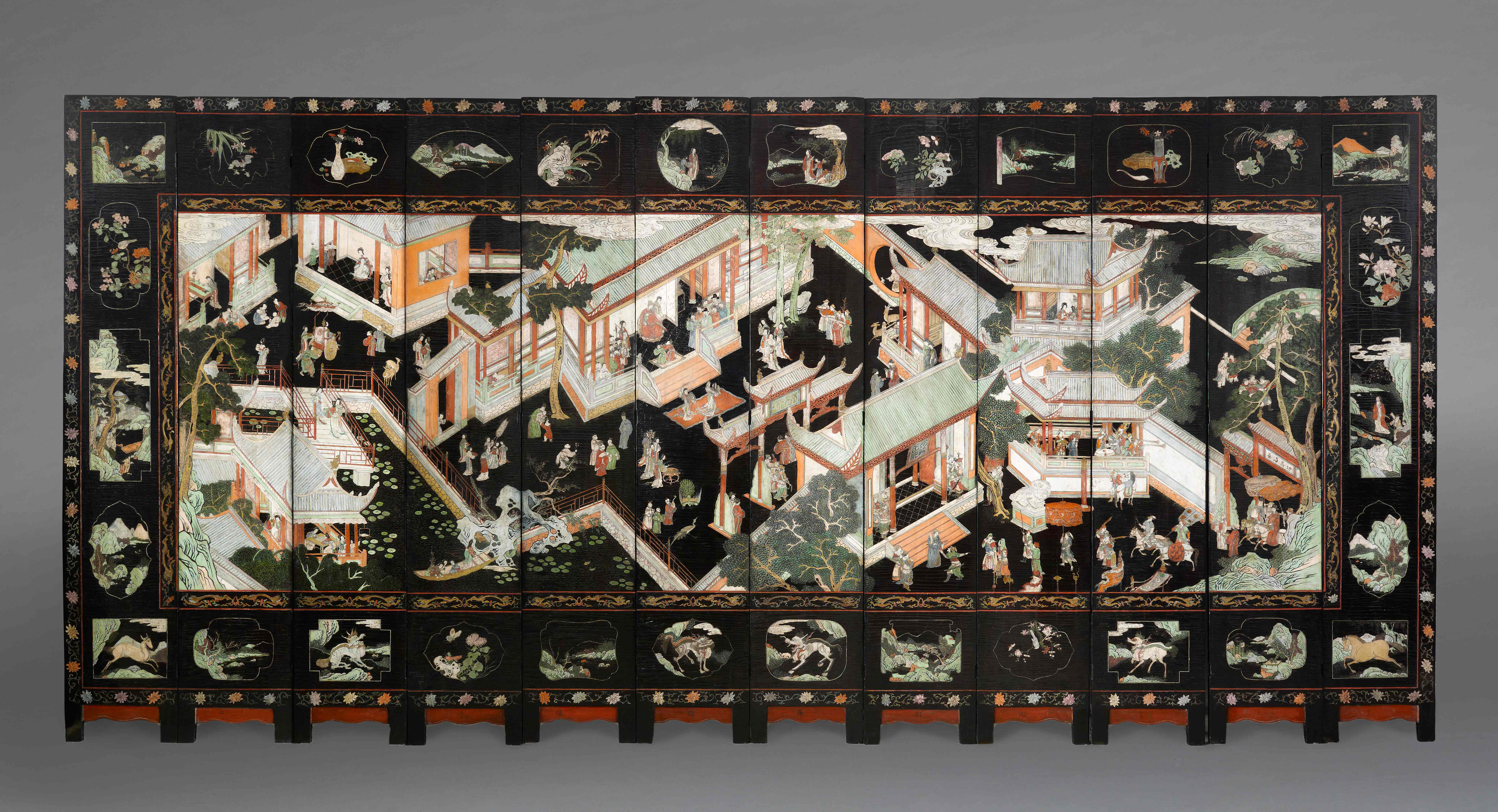
Coromandel lacquer folding screen with birthday celebration for Guo Ziyi, China, Qing dynasty (Guangdong Museum)

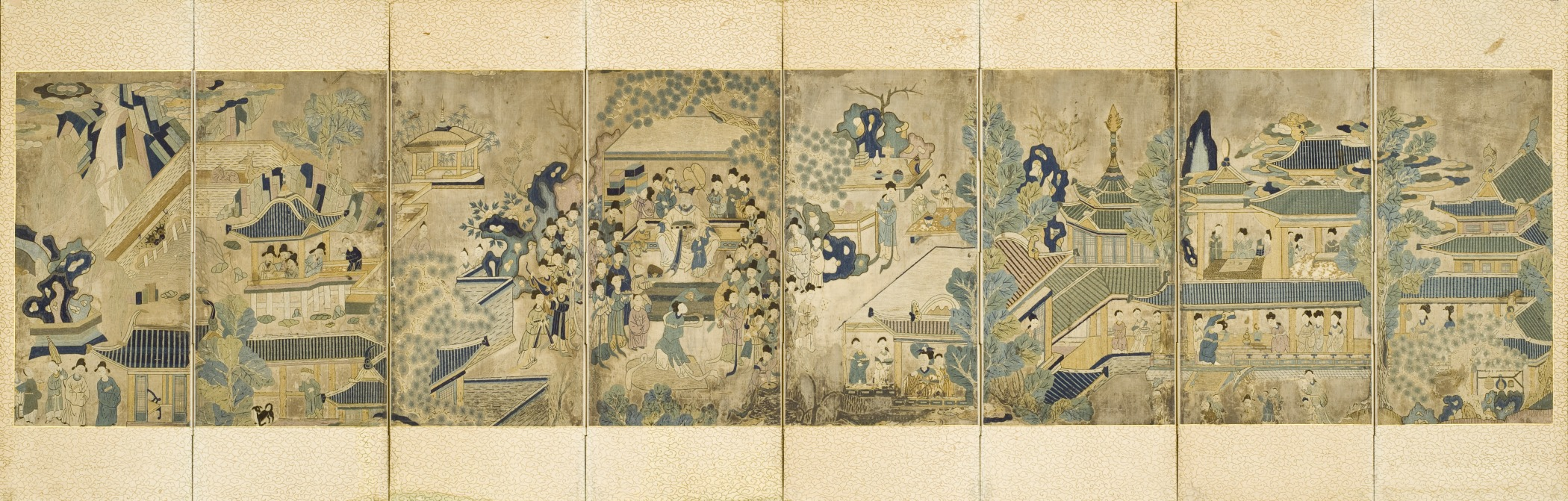
Joyous Banquet of Guo Fenyang (Korean: 곽분양행락도), folding screen, embroidery on silk, Korea, Joseon dynasty (Los Angeles County Museum of Art)

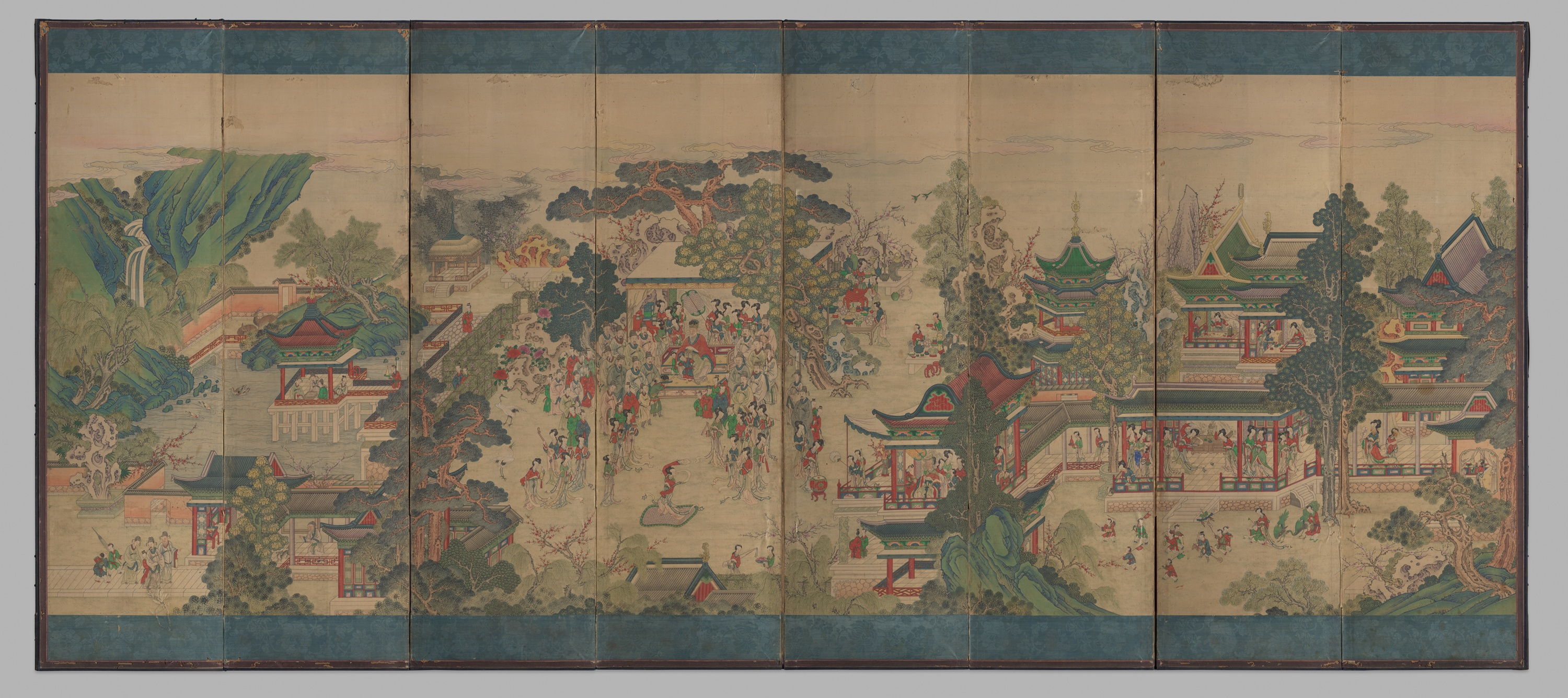
Joyous Banquet of Guo Fenyang, folding screen, ink and color on silk, Korea, Joseon dynasty (Art Institute of Chicago)

== In Fiction & popular Culture ==
- Portrayed by Leung Ka-Yan in TVB's Taming of the Princess (1997)
- Portrayed by Lee Kwok-lun in The Legend of Lady Yang. (2000)
- Portrayed by Wang Zhi Hua in Love With Princess (2006)
