= Khwar =

Khwar or Khvar may be:

- a placename component used in Greater Iran (see lists of articles with titles containing and)
- Khwar Pass, a pass in Persia and the site of the 18th-century Battle of Khwar Pass
- a medieval city probably related to the ancient town of Choara

== See also ==
- Khavar (disambiguation)
- Khuwar (disambiguation)
