= Maryam Salimi =

Iranian journalist

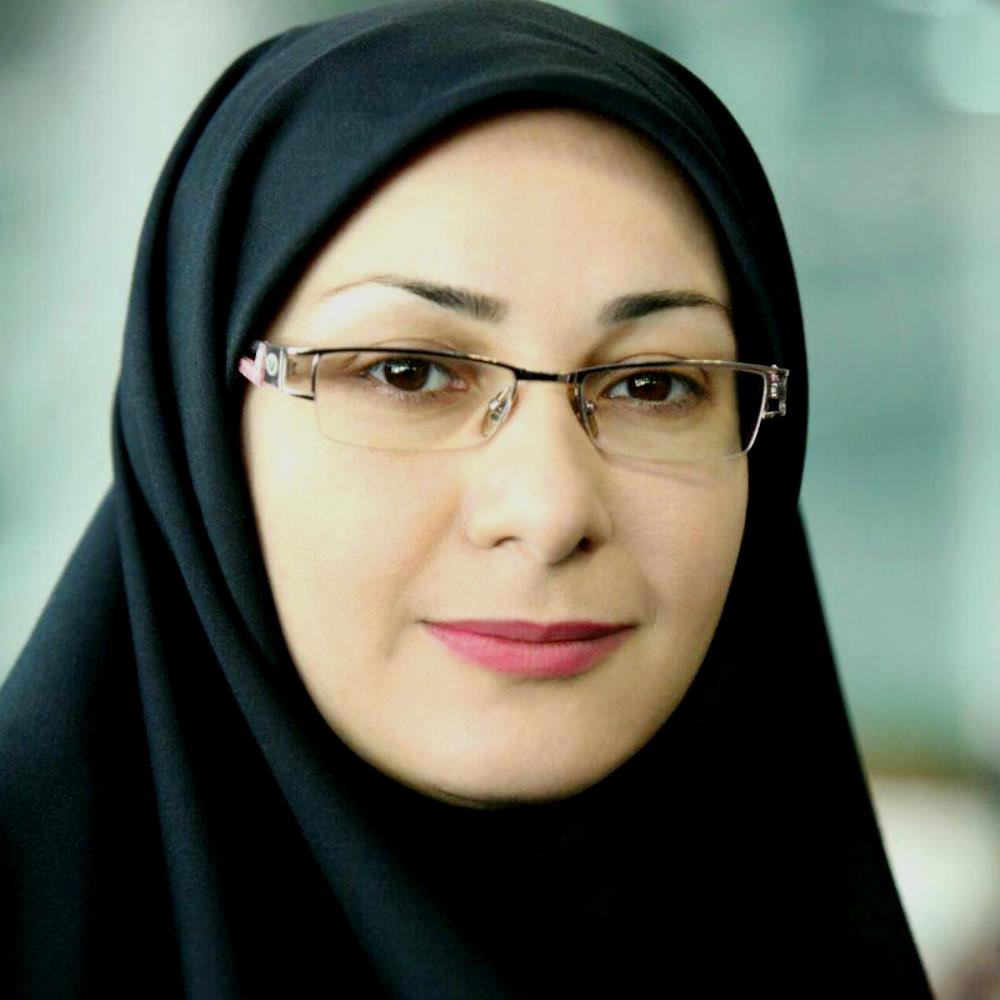
- Maryam Salimi
- Born: 20 January 1978 (age 48); Tehran, Iran
- Occupations: Writer; journalist; communications scholar
- Known for: Visual communications in infographics
- Notable work: News Graphics and Infographics, Infographics 2
- Spouse: Behrouz Mazloumifar
- Website: maryam-salimi.blogfa.com

Maryam Salimi (born 20 January 1978) is a writer, journalist, communications scholar, and expert in visual communications, particularly in infographics and news graphics.

== Early life ==
She received her PhD in social communications, her master's degree in graphics and journalism, and her bachelor's degree in public relations. Her master's thesis focused on news graphics and infographics, and her dissertation was centered around data journalism.

== Career ==
She has lectured at Islamic Azad University, Soore University, and the University of Applied Science and Technology. Salimi is a member of the educational content and book graphics task force in the Organization for Educational Research and Planning related to the Ministry of Education.

She has worked in publications with Khabar, Abrar Economic, Donya-e-Eqtesad, Public Relations, and Honar-e-Hashtom. She has also worked with Fars News Agency for 12 years and Tasnim News Agency from 2013. She is the media consultant for many organizations, article advisor of a number of scientific journals, and is the facilitator in student festivals. Salimi with Behrouz Mazloumifar (her spouse) has produced more than 1000 static infographics.

Salimi, along with other artists, set up an infographics exhibition in the 20th Press Festival on 11 March 2013. She held a news and infographics training course in the Bureau of Media Studies and Planning (affiliated with the press section of the Ministry of Culture and Islamic Guidance) in September 2014. She has introduced News and Infographics 2 (Interactive) during the press exhibition in 2014 and 2015.

== Bibliography ==
=== Author ===
- News Graphics and Infographics, Younes Shokrkhah and Maryam Salimi, Bureau of Media Studies and Planning, 2014.
- Walking Without You (Taradod Bi To), Ashian Publication, 2011.
- Blue Plate (Pelak-e-Abi), Ashian Publication, 2010.

=== Translation ===
- Infographics 2, Alberto Cairo, translated by Ahmad Ashrafi and Maryam Salimi, Soroush Publication, 2015.

== Awards ==
Salimi has been honored and awarded several festivals and ceremonies:

- Government critic in the 14th Press Festival
- Best report in news agencies in the 15th Press and News Agencies Festival
- Best interview in news agencies in 18th Press Festival
- One of the best reports in news agencies in the 19th Press Festival
- Third rank in Interview category in Banking Industry Festival
- Second rank in Interview category in the 1st Car Festival
- One of the top ten in Muslim Journalists Association
- Best poetry in Nedaye Vahdat International Festival
- Best artist in Fajr Afarinan Festival
- best report in the 3rd Press and News Agencies Festival in Tax Category
- Iran in Olympics in Infographics Festival
