= Apamea Ragiana =

Coordinates: 35°28′49″N 51°48′07″E

Apamea Ragiana (Greek: Απάμεια) – Apamea Rhagiana, Apamea Raphiana, or Apameia Rhagiane; previously, Arsace, Khuvar, and Choara – was an ancient Hellenistic city of Choarene, Media (formerly Parthia), according to Strabo 500 stadia (ca. 15 km) south of the Caspian Gates, southeast of Rhagae. The city was founded after the Macedonian conquest of Persia. The city is also mentioned by Ammianus Marcellinus (xxiii. 6). The precise location of Apamea is not known, but it is certainly in Iran; the ruins have not been found.

== See also ==
- Choara
- List of ancient Greek cities
