= Younes Shokrkhah =

Iranian journalist and academician (born 1957)

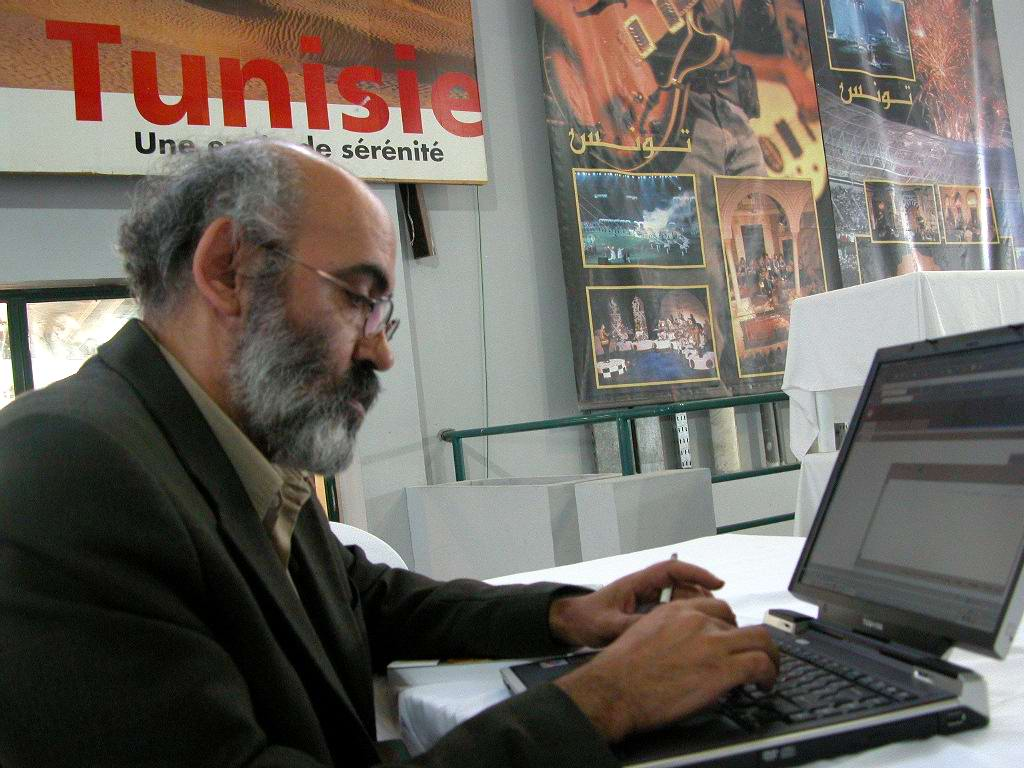
- Born: June 23, 1957 Mashhad, Khorasan, Iran
- Occupation: Journalist, University associate Professor
- Education: Mass Communication (Ph.D.)

Younes Shokrkhah (born 1957) is an Iranian journalist and academic. Younes, who lectures on communications and journalism, has been a journalist for thirty years, and is the ICT consultant for ME Printer magazine and a member of the Academic Board of the Center for Media Studies. He has been member of the juries of a dozen press and photo-journalism competitions.

== Early life ==
He is Assistant Professor of British Studies and Mass Communication at the Faculty of World Studies of University of Tehran. He has been the Head of the Institute for North American and European Studies (INAES) for six years. He is also the head of the Europe Department of the Faculty of World Studies. He is also a founding member of the Iranian National School of Cinema. Younes is a member of Graphic Arts Writers United (GAWU).

== Professional background ==
- 1982: starting Journalism (Etelaat [Information] Newspaper)
- 1983: Editor of Foreign Desk (Kayhan [World] Newspaper) (16 Years)
- 1990: Member of editorial Council of Sanat-e-Chap [Printing Industry Magazine]
- 1995: Member of the Scientific council of Rasaneh Quarterly [Mass Communication Quarterly]
- 2000: Editor of the Iranian Book weekly (4 years)
- 2001: Launching http://www.jamejamonline.ir (first online newspaper in Iran)
- 2003: Founding Member and Board of Managers of the Iranian Association of Studies on Information Society (IRASIS) (Continues)
- 2004: Member of the Steering Committee of the WSIS Regional Conference (World Summit on the Information Society)
- 2005: Launching http://www.hamshahrionline.ir (second online newspaper in Iran) (Continues)
- 2008: Head of the Institute for North American & European Studies - University of Tehran (Continues)
- News Graphics and Infographics, Younes Shokrkhah and Maryam Salimi Bureau of Media Studies and Planning, 2014.[45]

== International activities ==
- 1985: china

• Beijing: coverage of Iran’s Parliament Speaker meeting with Chinese officials and reporting on Tiananmen Square, the Forbidden City

• Xian: Qin Terra Cotta Warriors and Horses Museum

• Shanghai: reporting on Shanghai Museum,

- 1985: Japan

• Tokyo: coverage of Iran’s Parliament Speaker meeting with Japanese officials and reporting on automobile industry

• Nagasaki: reporting on Nagasaki Atomic Bomb Museum (next to the Peace Park)

- 1991: Senegal

• Dakar: news coverage of the presence of Iran’s president in OIC Summit

- 1991: Sudan

• Khartoum: news coverage of the meetings of Iran’s president with Sudanese officials

- 1991: Saudi Arabia

== Reporting on ==
• Jeddah: second largest city; pilgrimage gateway to Mecca

• Medina: second holiest city in Islam (traditionally spelled Medina in English)

• Mecca: the holiest city in Islam (traditionally spelled Mecca in English)

2001: Germany

• Frankfurt: covering Frankfurt Book Fair the largest forum for e-publishing

• Heidelberg: covering Heidelberg Print Media Academy

• Stuttgart: Covering book distribution companies

• Frankfurt: taking part in Big Questions Seminar dealing with the uncertain future of print and e-publishing

2002: United Arab Emirates

• Dubai: covering International Print Exhibition

• Abu Dhabi: reporting on print infrastructures

• Sharjah: reporting on print infrastructures

2003: Swiss

• Geneva: taking part in the first World Summit on Information Society, as a member of Scientific and cultural delegation with Iran’s President Seid Mohammad Khatami

2004: United Arab Emirates

• Dubai: covering Gulf Print Exhibition

• Joining to Me Printer Monthly (Middle East Print Communication Magazine based in Dubai Media City) as Editor

2005: United Arab Emirates

• Dubai: Visiting Media City, Internet City and Knowledge Village

2005: Tunisia

• Tunis: taking part in the Second World Summit on Information Society, as a member of Iranian Media and content Committee

2007: Japan

• Kyoto: Visiting International Research Center for Japanese Studies

2008: United Kingdom

• Birmingham: A Seminar on “American Studies and Iranian Studies: Bridging the Gaps between Nations and Disciplines”, December 4–6, 2008, University of Birmingham

2009: Netherlands

• Amsterdam and the Hague: University of Tehran (Iran) and the University of Amsterdam in the Middle East Academic Exchange Project

2013: Iraq

• Najaf and Karbala: Reporting on the construction of the new zarih (outer sarcophagus enclosure) of the holy shrine of Imam Hussein

2013: South Korea • Seoul, visiting Hankuk and Myong ji universities

2014: Swiss • Geneva, taking part in the WSIS+10 High-Level Event, Fourth physical meeting.

14-17 April 2014, Popov Room, ITU Headquarters

• Geneva, taking part in the WSIS+10 High-Level Event, Fifth physical meeting.

28-31 May 2014, WIPO Conference Room, WIPO Headquarters

• Geneva, taking part in the WSIS+10 High-Level Event. 10-13 June 2014 (9 June pre-events). More than 1600 participants including around 100 Ministers and leaders from international organizations, from business, civil society and academia met in Geneva for the WSIS+10 High-Level Event. The Event built upon two tracks, the High-Level Track, consisting of formal statements, handing over of prizes, and endorsement of the Outcome Documents, and the Forum Track. Building upon the tradition of annual WSIS Forum May meetings, the Forum track’s format and thematic focus was the result of an open consultation process with the involvement of all WSIS Stakeholders.

2015: Switzerland

WSIS Forum 2015 | Innovating Together: Enabling ICTs for Sustainable Development. workshop: E-science and Research in the Information Society: Key Factors for Sustainable Development - My presentation: Publicizing E-science: Media Coverage Considerations

2016: Switzerland

WSIS Forum 2016 | WSIS Action Lines: Supporting the Implementation of SDGs 2–6 May 2016, International Telecommunication Union (ITU), Place des Nations, 1211 Geneva, Switzerland

Workshop: E-Science Ecosystem and Collaborative Knowledge Societies - My presentation: Media and the Knowledge Societies: Toward a Cultivation Trend • Session 174 | Friday, 09:00 – 10:45 | Room L, ITU Montbrillant | Thematic Workshop

2017: Russia

Moscow, Saint Petersburg (23 April - 30 April) meeting with officials of the academic research centers with the delegation of the Faculty of World Studies of the university of Tehran

2017: Switzerland

Geneva, taking part in the WSIS Forum 2017 | Information and Knowledge Societies for SDGs 12–16 June 2017, International Telecommunication Union (ITU), Place des Nations, 1211 Geneva, Switzerland

Workshop: E-Science and Sustainable Development in the Information and Knowledge Societies - My presentation: Communication, E-science and Sustainable Development: The Considerations of a Technological Agenda •4:30 PM – 6:15 PM, June 12, 2017 | Room M1, ITU Montbrillant

2018: Switzerland

Geneva, taking part in the Leveraging ICTs to Build Information and Knowledge Societies for Achieving the Sustainable Development Goals (SDGs) 14:30–16:15, Thursday, 22 March 2018 Popov Room 1, ITU Tower Thematic Workshop

Workshop: Cross-Border e-Science and Research Partnerships for Shaping Better Information and Knowledge Societies - My presentation: Cross border E-Science and Research Partnership: Bridging the Gap Between Science and Media | 14:30–16:15, Thursday, 22 March 2018 - Popov Room 1, ITU Tower Thematic Workshop
