= Guo Kan =

Chinese general

Governor of Baghdad
- In office 1258–1259
- Succeeded by: Ata-Malik Juvayni

Personal details
- Born: 1217
- Died: 1277 (aged 59–60)

Military service
- Allegiance: Mongol Empire, Ilkhanate, Yuan dynasty
- Rank: General
- Battles/wars: Mongol–Jin War, Siege of Baghdad (1258), Battle of Xiangyang

Guo Kan (Chinese: 郭侃; pinyin: Guō Kǎn, 1217–1277 AD) was a Chinese general who served the Mongol Empire in their conquest of China and the West. He descended from a lineage of Chinese generals. Both his father and grandfather served under Genghis Khan, while his forefather Guo Ziyi was a famous general of the Chinese Tang dynasty.

Guo Kan became the first governor of Baghdad during Mongol rule and was instrumental in devising the strategy for the siege of Baghdad (1258). He served as a Mongol commander and was in charge of Chinese artillery units under the Yuan dynasty. He was one of the Han Chinese legions that served the Mongol Empire, and some of the later conquests of the Mongols were done by armies under his command. The biography of this Han commander in the History of Yuan said that Guo Kan's presence struck so much fear in his foes that they called him the "Divine Man".

== Birth and lineage ==
Guo Kan was raised in the household of Prime Minister Shi Tianzhe (who was also a Han, and whose father and two brothers all served the Yuan dynasty).

== Military legacy ==
He took part in the final drive in the conquest of the Jin dynasty, including the capture of Kaifeng. He then helped Subutai conquer West Eurasia, Europe, and the Middle East and was appointed governor of Baghdad by Hulagu. At some point after Kublai Khan's accession as Khan, Guo Kan assisted Kublai Khan in the conquest of the Southern Song and ultimately the reunification of China under the Yuan dynasty.

=== Middle East and Europe ===
He served Subutai in the conquest of Europe a few years following the fall of the Jin dynasty. He then served in Hulagu's conquest of the Middle East, playing a major role in the capture and battle of Baghdad, devising the strategy of using the dikes to drown the Caliph's army, and supervising the reduction of Baghdad's walls. He was then appointed the first Ilkhanate Governor of Baghdad by Hulagu, making him the first, and only Chinese governor of an Arab city.

According to the History of Yuan, he was present in the siege of Maymun-Diz during Hulegu's campaign against the Nizaris. Guo Kan attacked the inaccessible fortress by "catapults on mounts" (jiapao).

=== China ===
Guo Kan took part in the final drive in the conquest of the Jin dynasty, including the capture of Kaifeng. He then helped Subutai conquer West Eurasia, Europe, and the Middle East and was appointed governor of Baghdad by Hulagu. At some point after Khubilai Khan's accession as Khan, Guo Kan assisted Khubilai Khan in the conquest of the Southern Song and ultimately the unification of China under the Yuan dynasty. By this point the Mongol Yuan empire was nearly fully complete, stretching from China across Central Asia, Siberia, and the Middle East to Europe.

After Guo Kan returned to China with Hulagu Khan following Möngke Khan's death, Guo Kan helped Kublai Khan in the difficult conquest of Southern Song dynasty of Southern China. Khubilai's accession as becoming Khan allowed him to select the best Yuan Generals to serve him. Subutai and Jebe both died of old age, and Guo Kan was the last of the 'Gods of War', so the new Great Khan Khubilai assigned Guo Kan to command the final Yuan expedition and reunification of China.

Guo Kan reportedly urged Khubilai to adopt a Han Chinese-style dynastic title, establish a capital and central government, and build schools. He reportedly was the general who proposed capturing Xiangyang as a strategy for invading the Southern Song. In 1262, he defeated Song forces in a battle at Xuzhou, and in 1266 urged Khubilai to establish military farms in Huaibei to provide supplies for an invasion of the Southern Song. In 1268 and 1270 he suppressed local rebellions, and then he was sent to participate in the siege of Xiangyang. In 1276, the Song dynasty fell (except for the loyalist movement that lasted until 1279), and Guo served as a prefect for one more year before dying.

Guo Kan was a general who helped unify the massive Yuan Mongol empire. He played an important role in their conquests of all corners of the empire, from the east to west.
