= Khavar-e Seyyed Khalaf =

Khavar-e Seyyed Khalaf خاورسيدخلف
- Village
- Location within Iran
- Coordinates: 31°36′46″N 48°41′39″E
- Country: Iran
- Province: Khuzestan
- County: Ahvaz
- Bakhsh: Central
- Rural District: Anaqcheh

Population (2006)
  - Total: 661
- Time zone: UTC+3:30 (IRST)
  - Summer (DST): UTC+4:30 (IRDT)

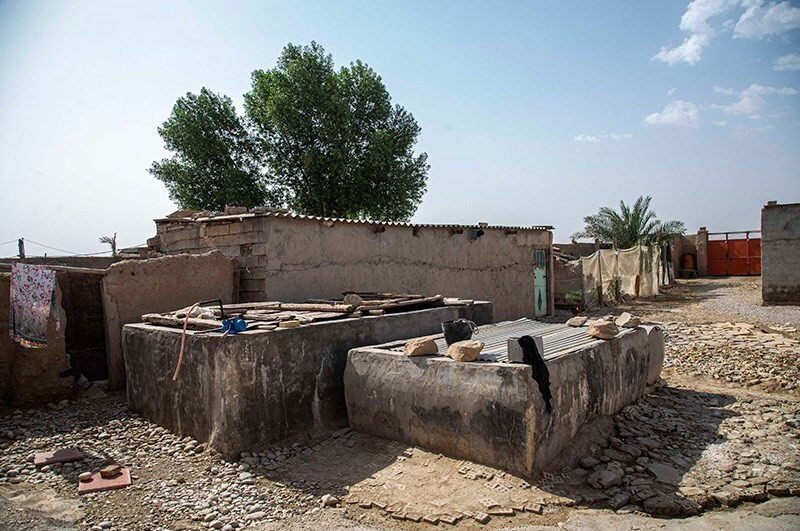
Khavar-e Seyyed Khalaf

Khavar-e Seyyed Khalaf (Persian: خاورسيدخلف, also Romanized as Khāvar-e Seyyed Khalaf; also known as Khāvar) is a village in Anaqcheh Rural District, in the Central District of Ahvaz County, Khuzestan Province, Iran. At the 2006 census, its population was 661, in 136 families.
