= Muhammad ibn al-Alqami =

Shia vizier and advisor to the last Abbasid caliph

Muhammad ibn al-Alqami (1197–1258) was a Shia vizier and advisor to the last Abbasid caliph, al-Musta'sim. Al-Alqami began his administrative career as a scribe under his uncle, Ustadār Adūd al-Dīn Abū Nasr al-Mubārak and he was appointed head of Dār al-tashrīfāt, then ustādār and finally vizier.

== History ==
He sent an envoy to Genghis Khan's grandson, Hulagu Khan who was the greatest Mongol chieftain and the King of Khorasan. When Hulagu Khan received the first letter, he did not pay much attention to it. Ibn Alqami had written that he would help capture Baghdad and Iraq easily without bloodshed so he had to fulfill them. Hulagu said to his envoy only this, 'What Ibn Alqami promised has no guarantee. How can we trust him?' In fact, the Caliph's large army, the Arab bravery and the courage of the people of Baghdad had impressed the Mongols and their army had suffered defeat at the hands of the Arab tribes in Syria.

Ibn Alqami went to the Caliph and after complaining about the lack of revenue and increasing the army's salaries, he offered to reduce the number of soldiers. The Caliph agreed. Most of the Baghdad army was sent to other cities and states. Those who were allowed to collect revenue from the market to pay their salaries. This caused great suffering to the people and looting became rampant. He disbanded many divisions of the army and expelled them. He told the Caliph that they were sent to the borders to check and stop the infiltration of the Mongols.

In the Hillah region, the Shiites outnumbered the Sunnis, he encouraged them to write a letter to Hulagu saying, "Our ancestors have prophesied that a Mongol chieftain will capture Baghdad and Iraq in such and such a year. According to the prophecy, you are the victorious chieftain and we are sure that you will soon take control of these areas. We are loyal to you and ask for your security and protection."

Hulagu wrote a letter of protection for them and handed it over to the envoy Nasir al-Din Suchi who had a great reputation in Hulagu's court and carried out the duties of a minister. He was also a Shiite fanatic like Ibn Alqami and he was an accomplice in his intrigues to destroy the Abbasids and establish the Shiite caliphate. Ibn Alqami wrote a letter to Nasir al-Din encouraging Hulagu Khan to attack Baghdad by any means and that it was a golden opportunity to give the final deadly blow to the Abbasids. He also wrote a letter to Hulagu Khan saying. "I have evacuated troops from Baghdad and sent all weapons of war. What more guarantee do you want?"

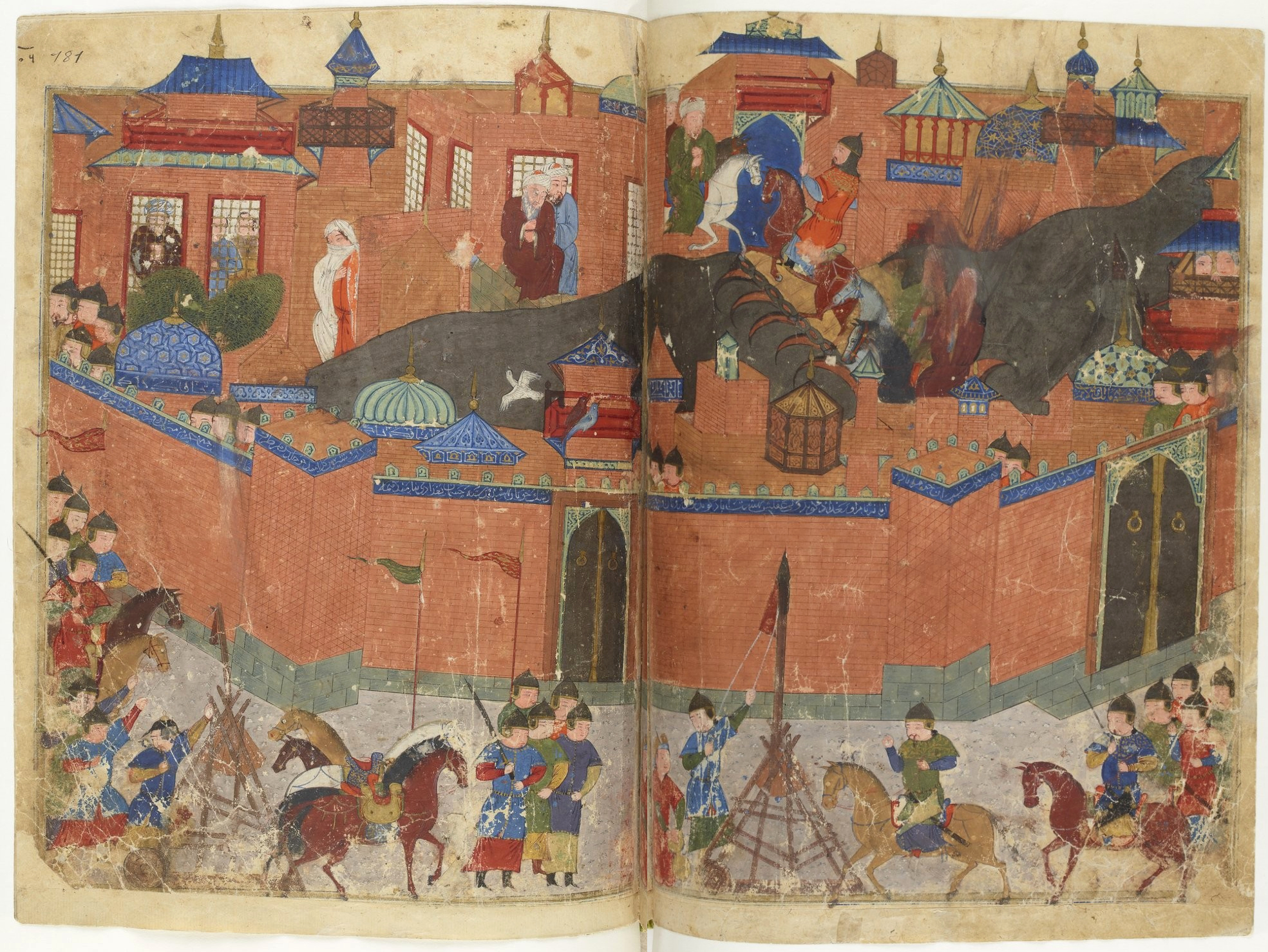
Painting of the Siege of Baghdad by the Mongols.

Simultaneously with this, he received a letter of application from the ruler of Ardbil, containing an inducement to launch an attack on Baghdad. Hulagu received these letters after he succeeded in conquering the Qaramita (Ismaili) Fortress of Death and the last King of the Ismailis had arrived in chains before him. Hulagu sought advice from Nasirruddin Suchi. He said, "Astrology says that Baghdad will be under your control and you will not suffer any loss if you occupy it." Hulagu sent a large army as a vanguard to Baghdad.

When Mustasim heard about this, he sent Fathuddin Dawud and Mujahidin Ebak with 10 thousand horsemen. The commander of the troops was Fathuddin who was a veteran and experienced general as well as a brave man. The Mongol troops were defeated and retreated. Fathuddin saw fit to remain there but the Mujahideen, due to their lack of experience, insisted on pursuing them. Because he was forced to, Fathuddin chased the Mongol troops. As a result, the Mongol troops turned and fought. The hidden Mongol troops attacked from behind. Baghdad's troops were pinned down and completely defeated. Fathuddin was killed in battle and the Mujahideen fled and took refuge in Baghdad. Due to the poor planning of the Mujahideen, the Baghdad army's victory turned into defeat. However, Caliph Mustasim, because of his courage, managed to defeat Baghdad's troops.

Although Baghdad's forces suffered defeat, Hulagu Khan's front was also in disarray with many wounded. So, the caliph Mustasim was satisfied that the storm had passed peacefully. But when Ibn Alqami who had kept the caliphate completely in the dark was laughing at his stupidity, news suddenly spread that Hulagu Khan had surrounded Baghdad with a large army. The people tried to hold on and for 50 days they did not let the Mongols enter the city.

The Shiites of the city approached Hulagu Khan's army one by one and received promises of safety and informed them about the situation in the city. Minister Ibn Alqami remained in the city and continued to send information minute by minute. Since the minister did not sympathize with the people of the city, they gradually became weaker. Finally, Minister Ibn Alqami came out of the city, met Hulagu Khan, sought safety and security only for himself and returned. He said to the caliph, "I also have a promise of safety for you. Let us go to Hulagu. He will let you continue to rule Iraq as the Mongols let Gheyathuddin Kaikhusru rule their territories."

The caliph came out of the city with his sons and went to Hulagu's army. Hulagu saw him and said, "Call all your government members and also the scholars and jurists in your city." Hulagu Khan detained the caliph. Hearing the caliph's order, the scholars and leaders of the government came out of the city and went to the Mongol army. They were all killed one by one. Then Hulagu said to the caliph, "Send a message to all the citizens to lay down their weapons and come out of the city empty-handed."

Painting of the Fall of Baghdad by the Mongols.

Mustasim sent a message to them. They came out and the Mongols began to kill them with swords. All of them, who numbered several hundred thousand soldiers, horsemen, and nobles of the city, were cut into pieces. All the trenches and ditches of the city were filled with corpses. The water of the Tigris River turned red from the blood of the slain. The Mongols entered the city. Women and children with the Quran on their heads came out but none survived. Hulagu Khan ordered his troops to carry out a general massacre. The Mongols killed everyone they killed. Only a few people who hid in wells and similar places survived. The next day, Friday in the month of Safar 656 AH. Hulagu Khan entered Baghdad with the Caliph Mustasim, he held court in the Caliph's palace, summoned the Caliph before him and said to him, "We are your guests, give us something".

The Caliph was so frightened that he could not find the right key. Finally, the lock of the treasury was broken. Two thousand fine clothes, one thousand dinars, and gold ornaments were presented to Hulegu Khan. He said, "If you do not give us these things, they will remain ours." Having said this, he distributed them to his courtiers. Then he ordered the treasure, which no one knew about, to be found. The Caliph immediately informed him of its existence. The ground was dug up and tanks full of jewels and bags of coins were revealed.

Ten million six hundred thousand Muslims were slaughtered in and around Baghdad and the Caliph had to witness all these tragic events. Hulegu made the Caliph not eat or drink. He felt hungry and asked for food. Hulegu ordered a tray full of jewels to be placed in front of him to eat. The Caliph said. How can I eat it?" Hulagu sent a message, "Why don't you finish this inedible food to save hundreds of thousands of Muslim lives and give it to your soldiers to fight on your behalf and save your ancestral country and protect you from us?" Then he consulted his men about killing Mustasim. All were in favor of his death. However, Nasiruddin Toosi and Ibun Alqami who saw the irony of the fortune said to Hulagu Khan, "Mustasim is the caliph of the Muslims. The sword should not be stained with his blood. He should be covered and rolled up in a blanket and kicked."

The task was given to Ibn Alqami. He rolled his master in a blanket and tied him to a pillar and kicked him so hard that he died. Then his body was kicked and crushed by the Mongol soldiers again until it was torn to pieces. Ibn Alqami stood beside him laughing and thinking that he was taking revenge on the Alawites. In short, the body of the caliph was not found in a shroud or a grave and not a single member of the Abbasid dynasty who was captured by the Mongols survived.

Then Hulagu turned to the royal library, which contained a huge number of books. All the books were thrown into the Tigris River, forming a kind of dam in the river and slowly the water washed them all away. The water of the Tigris River, which had previously been red with the blood of the slain, now turned black with the ink of the books and remained so for a long time. All the palaces of the kingdom were looted and then razed to the ground. It was a terrible massacre and catastrophe that had never happened before in the history of the world. It was such a catastrophe for Islam that they called it a minor apocalypse. Ibn Alqami who engineered the destruction and bloodshed now tried and wanted Hulagu Khan to appoint an Alawite ruler in Baghdad and confer on him the title of caliph.

Initially when Hulegu Khan invaded Baghdad, many promises were made to him and he was convinced that Hulegu Khan would make some Alawite caliphs and he (Alqami) would be made his Vice Ruler but Hulegu Khan assigned his own men to rule Iraq. Ibn Alqami was at his wits end seeing this development. He plotted and plotted, begged and pleaded with Hulegu Khan to achieve his goal but Hulegu Khan rebuked and chased him away like a dog and for a short time, he continued to serve the Mongols like a common slave but eventually in frustration killed him. Caliph Mustasim Billah was the last Abbasid caliph to rule in Baghdad. After 656 AH, Baghdad was no longer the capital. There was no caliph for three and a half years in the world after caliph Mustasim. After him, they took the oath for his subordinate Abul Qasim Ahmad in Rajab 659 AH.

A few months after the fall of Baghdad, Ibn Alqami died under unclear circumstances.
