= Maymun-Diz =

- میمون دژ

General information
- Status: Demolished
- Type: cave-fortress
- Location: disputed; near Alamut Castle, Iran
- Inaugurated: 1097
- Demolished: November 1256
- Client: Nizari Ismaili state

Technical details
- Material: plaster, gravel

Maymūn-Diz (Persian: میمون دز) was a major fortress of the Nizari Ismailis of the Alamut Period described in historical records. It has been variously identified with the Alamut Castle, Navizar Shah Castle, Shirkuh Castle, Shahrak Castle, and Shams Kalayeh Cave. Recently, Enayatollah Majidi located it on top of Mount Shatan (کوه شاتان Kūh-e Shātān; 36.4762463°N 50.6069645°E) near Khoshk Chal.

The fortress was capitulated by Imam Rukn al-Din Khurshah, who was residing there, to the invading Mongols under Hulagu and was subsequently demolished. This was followed by capitulation of Alamut and the disestablishment of the Nizari state.

== History ==
The date of the (beginning of the) construction by the Nizari Ismailis is variously given as 1097 (per Jami' al-tawarikh), 1103 (per Zubdat al-Tawarikh), and during the Imamate of Ala al-Din Muhammad (1211–1255) (per Tarikh-i Jahangushay). The fortress was on a great spur of rock rising almost vertically from the valley. Its ramparts were made of plaster and gravel. Elsewhere it has been described as an "extraordinary cave-fortress".

After the Mongol invasion of Iran and the subsequent death of the last Khwarezmian emperor, Hulagu Khan began to conquer the strongholds of the Nizari Ismailis as the main objective. He demanded the Nizari Imam Rukn al-Din Khurshah dismantle the Nizari fortresses, including Alamut, and surrender himself to Hulagu Khan, who had reached Rudbar. Khurshah was residing in Maymun-Diz, and soon found the fortress encircled by Hulagu Khan and his eight tümens (80,000 fighters). Teams of hand-picked Mongol fighters were distributed at around 250 meters intervals from the hilltop down to the valley.

Apparently, the Mongols were hesitant to push the siege of Maymun-Diz, and were persuaded to accept some sort of compromise. As winter was approaching, the besieging Mongols faced supply problems due to the difficulty of finding fodder for their horses. On 19 November 1256, Khurshah with a group of notables left the fortress and surrendered to Hulagu Khan. Considering how well-fortified and well-provisioned Alamut was, the Mongols welcomed the surrender. A group of Nizaris kept fighting in a last stand in the "qubba" (a supposedly high domed structure within the fort) and were killed. Maymun-Diz was subsequently destroyed and its inhabitants were massacred. This is traditionally considered the date of the disestablishment of the Nizari Ismaili state.

== See also ==
- Mustang Caves
