= Khavar (newspaper) =

Iranian newspaper in the Fars region

- Type: Newspaper
- Founder: Mahmood Erfan
- Founded: 1920
- Language: Persian
- City: Shiraz
- Country: Iran

Khavar (Persian: خاور) is an Iranian newspaper in the Fars region. The concessionaire of this newspaper was Mahmoud Erfan and it was published in Shiraz since 1920.

== See also ==
- List of magazines and newspapers of Fars
