= Teguder (Chagatai prince) =

13th-century Chagataid Mongol prince

Teguder (Tegüder, Tagūdār) was a 13th-century Chagataid Mongol prince, a grandson of Chagatai Khan through his son Mochi Yebe. A commander under Hulagu, Teguder staged a rebellion against Abaqa, the Ilkhan of Iran, from his base in Georgia in the late 1260s. Defeated, Teguder surrendered and was imprisoned, but he was eventually pardoned and released. Teguder's name has often been misread as Negudar and linked, erroneously, with the Negudaris, a Mongol tribe under the Jochid princes.

== Biography ==
Teguder was at the head of a Chagatai contingent that accompanied Hulagu to Iran. He was given a fief in Georgia. In the winter of 1267–68, Teguder accompanied the emissaries of his relative, Baraq, the ruler of the Chagatai Khanate, to Abaqa, the Ilkhan of Iran. With a conflict between Baraq and Abaqa brewing in the east, Teguder attempted to make his way into the Chagatai khanate by way of the pass of Darband, which he found barred and returned to Georgia. The Ilkhan sent the noyan Shiramun, son of Chormaqan, in his pursuit. Teguder was overtaken and defeated near Q'ueli. He was then given shelter by the Georgian king David Narin of Imereti, from where his men ravaged the territories of Georgian nobles loyal to Abaqa. The Ilkhan eventually persuaded David to withdraw his support to the fugitive prince. Defeated once more by Shiramun, Teguder surrendered in late 1269. He was imprisoned for a year on an island in Lake Urmia and then pardoned and released after Abaqa's victory over Baraq.
