= Choara (Parthia) =

Ancient town

Choara (Latin; from Ancient Greek: Χόαρα Khóara, from Old Iranian *huṷăra- or *xṷăra-) was a town or village recorded by Greek authors, and was probably the center of the district Choarene. The "Choarene" mentioned by Strabo refers to this town, not the district. It was part of the region Media, until the rise of the Arsacids who incorporated it to Parthia. The Hellenistic city of Apameia was also located in the Choarene district.

This place-name is probably related to Khuwār (Persian: خوار) mentioned by Muslim geographers, located in the Qumis region along the Great Khorasan Road, and the modern district of Khāvar, with its center being Arādān.
