= Nuzhat al-Qulub =

14th-century Persian geographical treatise

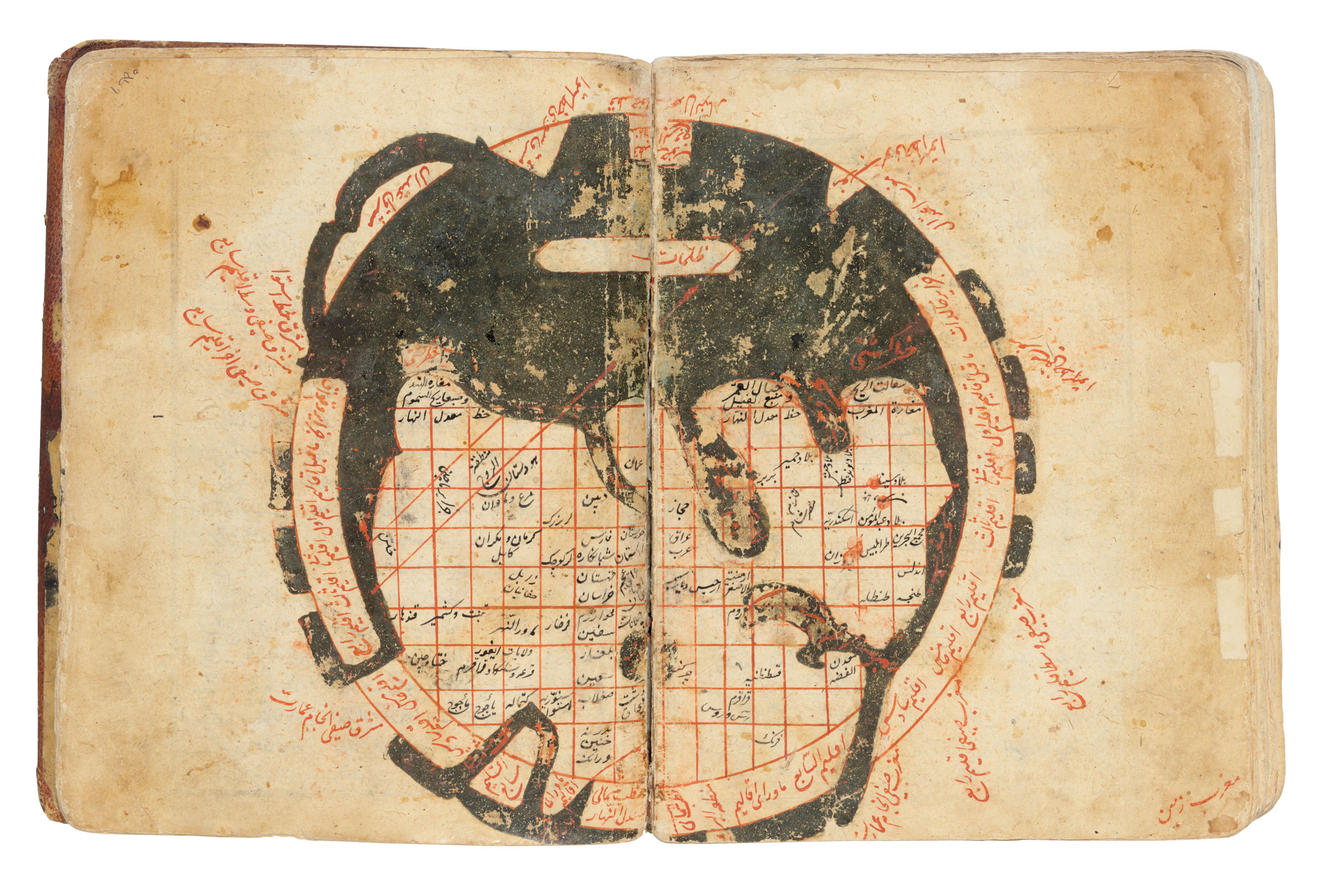
Map of the geography of Iran, based on a copy of the Nuzhat al-Qulub. Created in Safavid Iran on 18 October 1641

The Nuzhat al-Qulub (also spelled Nozhat al-Qolub; Persian: نزهةالقلوب, lit. 'Hearts' Bliss') is a Persian-language geographical treatise written in the 1340s by Hamdallah Mustawfi. It is the earliest surviving work to have a map focused on Iran.

== Background ==
The date when Mustawfi completed the book is uncertain. According to Charles P. Melville, it was completed in 1344; A. C. S. Peacock says that it was completed "no later than 1340"; Nadja Danilenko says that it was completed 1340; Peter Jackson says that it was completed in 1340 or soon afterwards; Linda Komaroff says that it was probably completed in the 1340s.

The Nuzhat al-Qulub is considered Mustawfi's most prominent work and is virtually the only source to describe the geography and affairs of the Mongol Ilkhanid Empire. The source gives vital information about the government, commerce, economic life, sectarian conflicts, tax-collection and other similar topics. Just like his previous works of Tarikh-i guzida and Zafarnamah, Mustawfi says he does not have expertise in the field, and that he was encouraged by his friends to write the work. He also thought that an available source in Persian would be helpful, due to most geographical sources about Iran being in Arabic (such as the works of Abu Zayd al-Balkhi and Ibn Khordadbeh).

== Contents ==
The work is also considered a substantial contribution to the ethno-national history of Iran. Mustawfi notably uses the term "Iran" in his work. Since the fall of the Iranian Sasanian Empire in 651, the idea of Iran or Iranzamin ("the land of Iran") as a political entity had disappeared. However, it did remain as an element of the national sentiment of the Iranians, and was occasionally mentioned in the works of other people. With the advent of the Ilkhanate, the idea experienced a resurgence. According to the modern historian Peter Jackson (2017), the reason behind this resurgence was the fall of the Abbasid Caliphate in 1258 and the "relative disenfranchisement of political Islam." Furthermore, by using this term, Mustawfi also portrayed the Ilkhanate as successors of the Sasanians.

Mustawfi describes the borders of Iran extending from the Indus River to Khwarazm and Transoxiana in the east to Byzantium and Syria in the west, corresponding to the territory of the Sasanian Empire. He defines the provinces of Iran in 20 chapters; Iraq ("Arab Iraq") or the "heart of Iranshahr", Persian Iraq, Arran, Mughan, Shirvan, Georgia, Byzantium, Armenia, Rabi'a, Kurdistan, Khuzestan, Fars, Shabankara, Kirman, Mukran, Hormuz, Nimruz, Khorasan, Mazandaran, Qumis, Tabaristan and Gilan. Since the 13th century, historians have followed this approach to Iran's history and geography.

== Sources ==
- Ashraf, Ahmad (2006). "Iranian identity iii. Medieval Islamic period". In Yarshater, Ehsan (ed.). Encyclopædia Iranica. Vol. XIII/5: Iran X. Religions in Iran–Iraq V. Safavid period. London and New York: Routledge & Kegan Paul. pp. 507–522. ISBN 978-0-933273-93-1.
- Danilenko, Nadja (2020). Picturing the Islamicate World. Gorgias Press. ISBN 978-9004439856.
- Hillenbrand, Carole (2007). Turkish Myth and Muslim Symbol: The Battle of Manzikert. Edinburgh University Press. ISBN 9780748625727. JSTOR 10.3366/j.ctt1r2bzf. (registration required)
- Kamola, Stefan (2019). Making Mongol History Rashid al-Din and the Jamiʿ al-Tawarikh. Edinburgh University Press. ISBN 978-1474421423.
- Komaroff, Linda (2012). Beyond the Legacy of Genghis Khan. Brill. pp. 1–678. ISBN 9789004243408.
- Jackson, Peter (2017). The Mongols and the Islamic World: From Conquest to Conversion. Yale University Press. ISBN 9780300227284. JSTOR j.ctt1n2tvq0. (registration required)
- Lane, George (2014). "Persian Notables and the Families Who Underpinned the Ilkhanate". Nomads as Agents of Cultural Change. University of Hawaii Press. pp. 182–213. doi:10.1515/9780824847890-011. ISBN 9780824847890.
- Melville, Charles (2003). "Ḥamd-Allāh Mostawfi". In Yarshater, Ehsan (ed.). Encyclopædia Iranica. Vol. XI/6: Ḥājj Sayyāḥ–Harem I. London and New York: Routledge & Kegan Paul. pp. 631–634. ISBN 978-0-933273-70-2.
- Melville, Charles (2012). Persian Historiography: A History of Persian Literature. Bloomsbury Publishing. ISBN 978-1845119119.
- Melville, Charles (2019). "Concepts of government and state formation in Mongol Iran". In Babaie, Sussan (ed.). Iran After the Mongols. Bloomsbury Publishing. pp. 1–320. ISBN 9781786736017.
- Peacock, A. C. S. (2019). Islam, Literature and Society in Mongol Anatolia. Cambridge University Press. ISBN 978-1108499361.
- Spuler, B. (1971). "Ḥamd Allāh b. Abī Bakr b. Aḥmād b. Naṣr al-Mustawfī al-Ḳazwīnī". In Lewis, B.; Ménage, V. L.; Pellat, Ch. & Schacht, J. (eds.). The Encyclopaedia of Islam, Second Edition. Volume III: H–Iram. Leiden: E. J. Brill. OCLC 495469525.
