= Ata-Malik Juvayni =

Persian historian (1226–1283)

- عطاملک جوینی
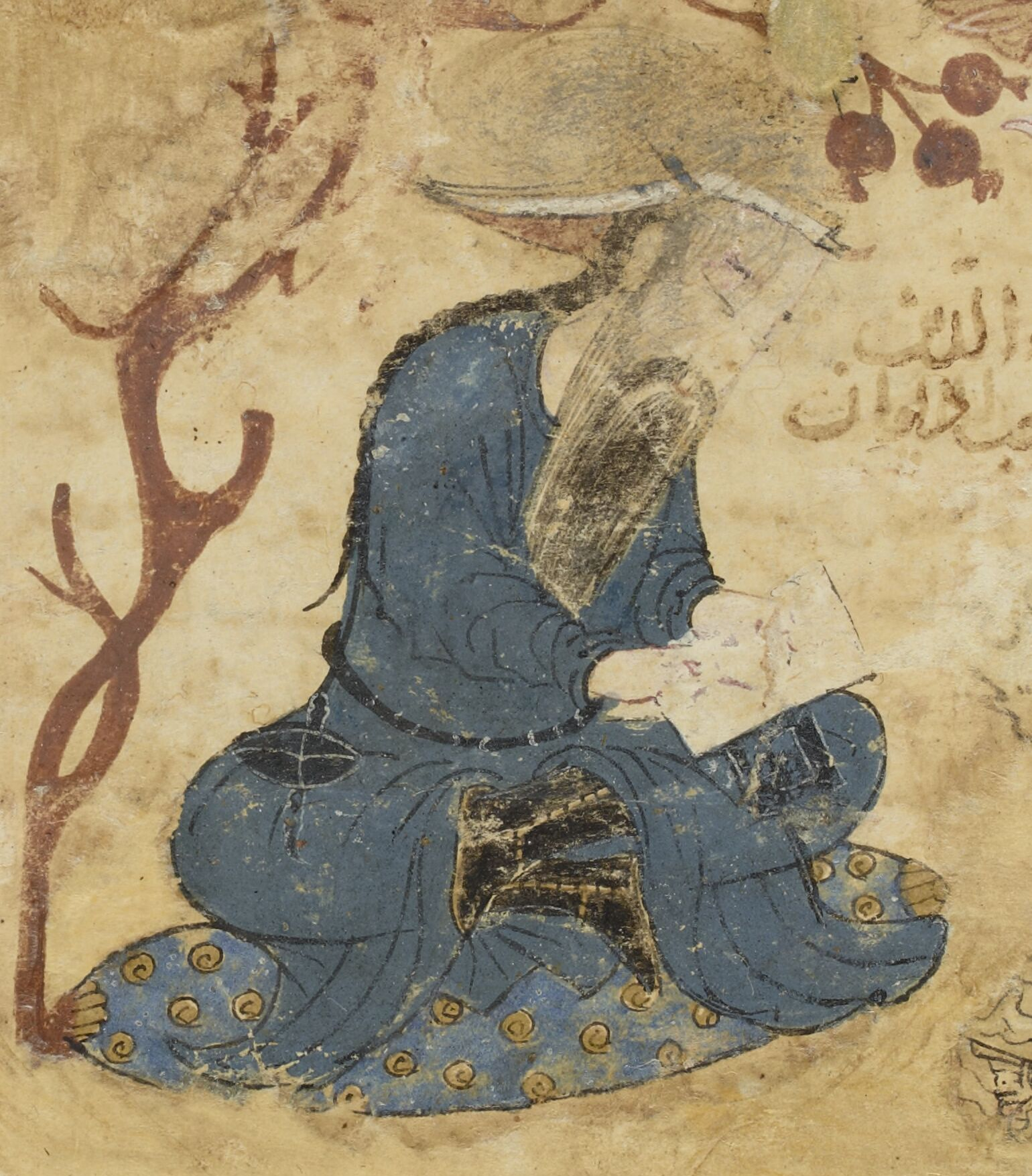
- Depiction of Ata-Malik Juvayni writing, from a 1290 edition of the Tarikh-i Jahangushay. Located in the Bibliothèque nationale de France

Governor of Baghdad
- In office 1259–1283
- Preceded by: Guo Kan
- Succeeded by: Sharaf al-Din Harun Juvayni

Personal details
- Born: 1226
- Died: 5 March 1283 (aged 56–57) Mughan, Ilkhanate
- Resting place: Charandab Cemetery, Tabriz
- Relations: Shams al-Din Juvayni (younger brother); Sharaf al-Din Harun Juvayni (nephew)
- Children: Mansur; Ismatuddin
- Parent: Baha al-Din Muhammad Juvayni (father)

Military service
- Allegiance: Mongol Empire; Ilkhanate
- Writing career
- Language: Persian
- Notable works: Tarikh-i Jahangushay

Ata-Malik Juvayni (Persian: عطاملک جوینی, romanized: Ata-Malik Juvayni; 1226 – 5 March 1283) was a bureaucrat and historian from the Juvayni family who served under the Mongol Empire. He is known for composing the Tarikh-i Jahangushay ("History of the World Conqueror"), an important account on the history of Central Asia and the 13th-century Mongol invasion of Muslim world.

== Early life ==
Born in 1226, Ata-Malik belonged to the Persian Juvayni family, whose history of administrative and public service goes back to the Seljuk era. Both his grandfather and his father, Baha al-Din, had held the post of sahib-divan or Minister of Finance for Muhammad Jalal al-Din and Ögedei Khan, respectively. Baha al-Din also acted as deputy c. 1246 for his immediate superior, the emir Arghun Aqa, in which role he oversaw a large area, including the Kingdom of Georgia.

== Career ==
Just like his predecessors, Ata-Malik became an important state official. He visited the Mongol capital of Karakorum twice, beginning his history of the Mongols conquests on one such visit (c. 1252–53). He was with Ilkhan Hulagu in the 1256 campaign at the taking of Alamut, where he selected many 'choice books' from the famous Alamut library for his own purposes and burnt the books that he did not like. He was responsible for saving part of its celebrated library. He had also accompanied Hulagu during the sack of Baghdad in 1258, and the next year was appointed governor of Baghdad, Lower Mesopotamia, and Khuzistan. Around 1282, Ata-Malik attended a Mongol quriltai, or assembly, held in the Ala-Taq pastures northeast of Lake Van. He died the following year in Mughan.

Ata-Malik was survived by at least one son, Mansur (died 1293) and a daughter who became the wife of the Sufi shaykh Sadr al-Din Ibrahim Hamuwayi, who played a key role in converting the later Ilkhanate ruler Ghazan to Islam. According to Tarikh-i Uljaytu by Abu al-Qasim Kashani, this daughter was named Ismatuddin and she died in Maragha, August 1306.

== Siege of Alamut ==
Ata-Malik's brother was the powerful Shams al-Din Mohammad Sahib-Divan, who had served as Minister of Finance under Hulagu and Abaqa Khan. A skillful leader in his own right, Shams al-Din also had influential in-laws: his wife Khoshak was the daughter of Avag Mkhargrdzeli, Lord High Constable of Georgia, and Gvantsa, a noblewoman who went on to become queen of Georgia.

== Work and legacy ==
Ata-Malik's position at court and his family connections made him privy to information unavailable to other historians. For unknown reasons, Ata-Malik's Tarikh-i Jahangushay ends in 1260, more than twenty years before his death.

The standard edition of Ata-Malik's history is published under the title Tarikh-i Jahangushay, ed. Mirza Muhammad Qazwini, 3 vol, Gibb Memorial Series 16 (Leiden and London, 1912–37). An English translation by John Andrew Boyle The History of the World-Conqueror was published in 1958 and republished in 1997.

== Sources ==
- Lane, George E. "Jovayni, ʿAlāʾ-al-Din". Encyclopædia Iranica. Vol. 15. pp. 63–68. Fascicle 1.
- Tucker, Ernest. "Jahāngošā-ye Nāderi". Encyclopædia Iranica. Vol. 14. pp. 382–383. Fascicle 4.
- Zaryab, Abbas (2002). "Baghdad ii. From the Mongol Invasion to the Ottoman Occupation". Encyclopædia Iranica.
- Rajabzadeh, Hashem (2009). "Jovayni Family". Encyclopædia Iranica. pp. 61–63. Vol. XV, Fasc. 1
- Ashraf, Ahmad (2006). "Iranian identity iii. Medieval Islamic period". Encyclopædia Iranica. pp. 507–522. Vol. XIII, Fasc. 5
- Dashdondog, Bayarsaikhan (2011). The Mongols and the Armenians (1220-1335). Brill Publishers. ISBN 978-90-04-18635-4.
