= Bande Tabrizi =

Bande Tabrizi (Persian: بَنْده تَبْریزی; 1745 – 1808) was an 18th and 19th century poet, writer and calligrapher in Zand and Qajar Iran. He is the author of the Persian-language universal history Zinat al-tavarikh ("Adornment of histories").

== Sources ==
- Quinn, Sholeh; Melville, Charles (2012). Yarshater, Ehsan; Melville, Charles (eds.). Persian Historiography: History of Persian Literature A, Vol X (A History of Persian Literature). I.B.Tauris. ISBN 978-1845119119.
- Tahqiqi, Leila (2019). "بندۀ تبریزی". The Great Islamic Encyclopaedia (in Persian).
