= Nuzhe =

Musical Instrument from Azerbaijan

String
- Classification: Stringed, Struck

Related instruments
- String instruments; Box zither

Musicians
- Günel Adıgozəlova

The nuzhe (Azerbaijani: nüzhə or ənnüzhət) is an Azerbaijani string instrument. Nuzhe was made in base of çeng and qanun (instrument). Nuzhe, invented by prominent music expert Safi al-Din al-Urmawi.

== Etymology ==
The words "Nuzha" and "An-Nuzha" in Arabic mean "entertainment" or "delight," which relates to the instrument's sound timbre.

== History ==
This instrument, widely used in the Middle Ages, began to fade from memory after the 16th century. However, through research in archives, it has become possible to restore the instrument.

== Structure ==
In terms of structure, it resembles the santur and is chromatic like the santur. It has a long rectangular shape with 81 strings. Considering that every three strings are tuned in unison, it can be deduced that the Nuzha musical instrument produces 27 different sounds.

== See also ==
- Safi al-Din al-Urmawi
- Mugni
