= Bi Bi Monajemeh Nishaburi =

Persian mathematician and astronomer (1203–1280)

- بی بی منجمه نیشابوری
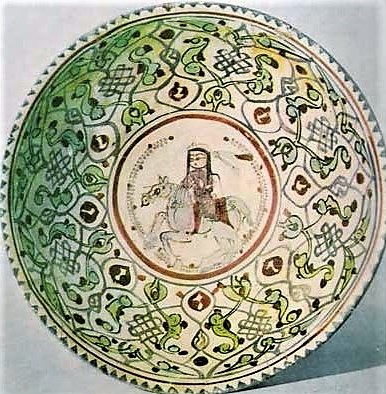
- Monajemeh depicted in a late Seljuk ceramic plate
- Born: 1203; Nishabur, Iran
- Died: 1280 (aged 76–77); Konya
- Children: Ibn Bibi (son)

Academic work
- Era: Islamic Golden Age
- Main interests: Mathematics, astronomy

Bi Bi Monajemeh Nishaburi (Persian: بی بی منجمه نیشابور) also known as Monajemeh Nishaburi or Bichai Munachchima (1203–1280), was a Persian-Tajik poet, mathematician and astronomer. She is chiefly known for her astronomical works. She was born in Nishapur, now in modern Iran.

== Biography ==
Bi Bi Monajemeh Nishaburi's father, Kamal ad-Din Semnani, was the chief of the Shafi'i group in Nishabur, and an astronomer working for Shah Muhammad II of Khwarazm. Monajemeh learned about astronomy from her father; their house was used as a meeting place for scholars, intellectuals and philosophers, which enabled Monajemeh to learn about mathematics and astronomy at a young age. Her mother was the granddaughter of Mohammad ebn-Yahya, a notable lawyer in Khorasan.

Contemporary commentaries refer to Monajemeh as a virtuous woman, with a deep knowledge of astrology and making calendars. Some of her poems are extant.

Monajemeh became famous for her knowledge of astronomy; due to her proficiency, she became known as Bibi.

Monajemeh's profession as astrologer can be deduced from her title monajjema, worked as an astronomer and a consultant for Shah Jalal al-Din Mangburni (until 1247) and Shah Kayqubad I, both of whom believed in the use of astrology when devising military tactics. Monajemeh was consulted before many of their battles. She is said to have been present during battles fought against the Mongols, and was famous for fighting; it is mentioned by contemporary historians that she was present beside the sultan on the battlefield. During the war between the Shamians and the Roman Seljuks, Bibi predicted that the sultan would win the war. After his victory, his belief in her abilities as an astrologer were such that he placed his robe over her.

At the height of Monajemeh's fame, Kamal al-Din Kamiyar (on behalf of the Seljuk sultan Ala-al-Din Kiqbad) went to the court of the Khwarizmshahs, and observed saw her proximity to the sultan. On returning home, he informed Alaad-Din Kiqbad of her knowledge. However, by that time, Bibi's position at court had weakened. When the sultan was defeated by the Mongols and killed—an event she is said to have predicted—she moved to Damascus, where the Seljugy king, Kayqubad I, who had heard about Monajemeh, sent his representative to invite Monajemeh to his court. Monajemeh's successes raised her status at the court.

Monajemeh married Majd ad-Din Mohammad, an official in the court of Jalal al-Din Mangburni, who had previously been an official under Šams-al-Dīn Moḥammad, grandfather of the Persian statesman Shams al-din Muhammad ibn Muhammad Juvayni. The couple lived together as members of the royal household. Their son, Amir Naser ad-Din Hossein (also known as Naser ad-Din, as well as Ibn Bibi, because of his mother's fame), became a military commander, who wrote the history of the Seljuq dynasty from 1209 to 1300. (Note: Bi Bi, originally Turkish (“little old mother", “grandmother”, “woman of high rank", “lady’’). In Persian it had the meaning “woman of the house" or “lady”). B's son al-Husayn b. Muhammad was born Ali al-Dja‘fari al-Rughadi, but is more widely known as Ibn Bibi al-Munadjdjima ("son of the distinguished lady, the woman astrologer"). A wife of the Persian mystic)

Safi-ad-din Ardabili was called Bibi Fatima.

Bi Bi Monajemeh Nishaburi died in Konya, now in Turkey.

== Sources ==
- Amirshahi, N., ed. (2013). Tajik National Encyclopedia (PDF) (in Tajik). Vol. 2. Government of Tajikistan. Archived from the original (PDF) on 22 January 2022.
- Mirza, Umair (1986). Encyclopedia of Islam. Vol. 1. Lieden: Brill Publishers.
