= Shams al-din Muhammad ibn Muhammad Juvayni =

13th-century Persian statesman

Shams al-din Muhammad Juvayni (Persian: شمس‌الدین محمد جوینی) was a Persian statesman and member of the Juvayni family. He served as the state treasurer (mustawfi) of the Khwarazmshah Ala al-Din Muhammad II (r. 1200–1220) and his son Jalal al-Din Mangburni (r. 1220–1231).

Shams al-Din Muhammad had a son named Baha al-Din Muhammad Juvayni, whose sons Ata-Malik Juvayni and Shams al-Din Juvayni would become influential figures in the early days of Ilkhanate rule in Iran.

== Sources ==
- Rajabzadeh, Hashem (2009). "JOVAYNI FAMILY". Encyclopaedia Iranica, Vol. XV, Fasc. 1. pp. 61–63.
- Lambton, Ann K. S. (2016). Continuity and Change in Medieval Persia. I.B.Tauris. pp. 1–425. ISBN 9780887061332.
