= Hamdallah Mustawfi =

Persian historian, writer and scholar

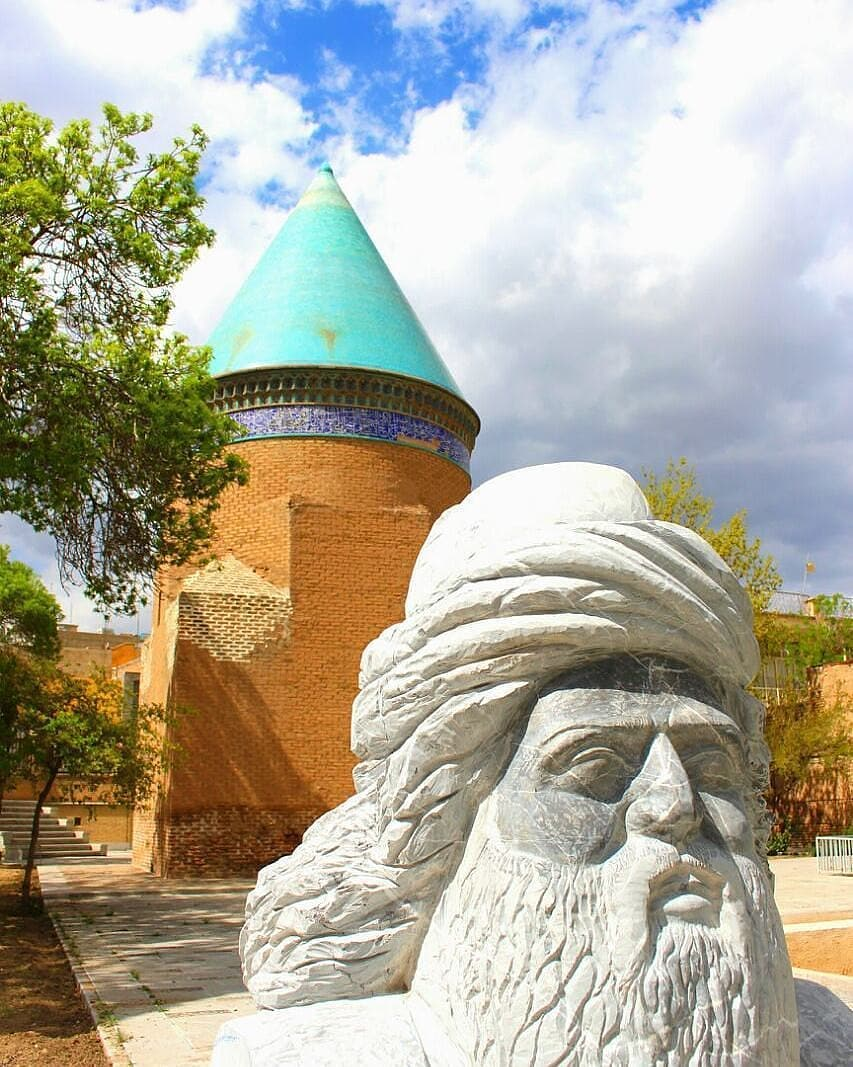
- Bust of Hamdallah Mustawfi in Qazvin. His mausoleum lies in the background
- Born: 1281 Qazvin, Ilkhanate
- Died: after 1339/40 Qazvin, Chobanid Amirate
- Notable works: Tarikh-i guzida Zafarnamah; Nuzhat al-Qulub
- Relatives: Amin al-Din Nasr (great-grandfather); Zayn al-Din (brother); Fakhr al-Din Mustawfi (cousin)

Hamdallah Mustawfi Qazvini (Note: It is uncertain whether his name was Hamd or Hamdallah. Humayun-Farrukh calls him "Homad".) (Persian: حمدالله مستوفى قزوینی, romanized: Ḥamdallāh Mustawfī Qazvīnī; 1281 – after 1339/40) was a Persian official, historian, geographer and poet. He lived during the last era of the Mongol Ilkhanate, and the interregnum that followed.

A native of Qazvin, Mustawfi belonged to family of mustawfis (financial accountants), thus his name. He was a close associate of the prominent vizier and historian Rashid al-Din Hamadani, who inspired him to write historical and geographical works. Mustawfi is the author of three works; Tarikh-i guzida ("Excerpt History"), Zafarnamah ("Book of Victory") and Nuzhat al-Qulub ("Hearts' Bliss"). A highly influential figure, Mustawfi's way of conceptualizing the history and geography of Iran has been emulated by other historians since the 13th century.

He is buried in a dome-shaped mausoleum in his native Qazvin, Iran.

== Biography ==
Map of Persian Iraq and its surroundings. Mustawfi's hometown of Qazvin is located in the northwest, close to the Caspian Sea

Mustawfi was born in 1281 in the town of Qazvin, located in Persian Iraq (Irāq-i Ajam), a region corresponding to the western part of Iran. His family was descended from Arabs that had occupied the governorship of the town in the 9th and 10th-centuries, later to serve as mustawfis (high-ranking financial accountants) at the advent of the Ghaznavids. Mustawfi's great-grandfather Amin al-Din Nasr had served as the mustawfi of Iraq, which had since then been the moniker of the family. Amin al-Din Nasr, during his retirement, was killed in 1220 by raiding Mongols after the sack of Qazvin, during the Mongol invasion of Iran.

Regardless, Mustawfi's family still greatly served the Mongols and even rose to further prominence during this period; his older cousin Fakhr al-Din Mustawfi briefly served as vizier of the Ilkhanate, while his brother Zayn al-Din was an assistant of the prominent vizier and historian Rashid al-Din Hamadani. Mustawfi's family was thus amongst those many families from Persian Iraq who rose to prominence during the Mongol era. Rivalry soon arose between the Persian Iraqis and the already established Khurasanis, particularly between the Mustawfis and the Juvayni family, which is evident in Mustawfi's work, where mention of the Juvaynis are omitted in some cases. Mustawfi followed in the footsteps of his family, being in 1311 appointed as the financial accountant of his native Qazvin, as well as other neighbouring districts, including Abhar, Zanjan and Tarumayn.

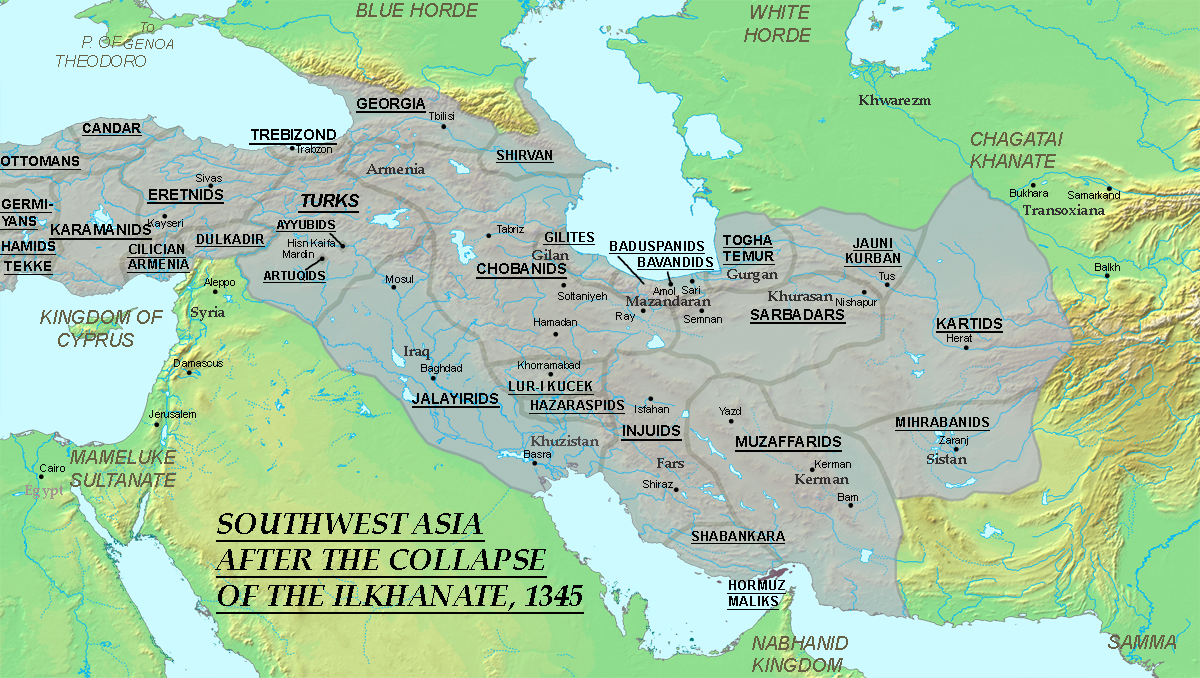
Map showing the political situation in the Middle East in 1345, ten years after the fall of the Ilkhanate

He had been appointed to this post by Rashid al-Din, who made him gain an interest in history, inspiring him to start writing the Zafarnamah ("Book of Victory") in 1320, as a continuation of Ferdowsi's Shahnameh ("Book of Kings"). He completed the work in 1334, consisting of 75,000 verses, reporting the history of the Islamic era up until the Ilkhanate era. Before that, he had also written a similar chronicle; the Tarikh-i guzida ("Excerpt History") in 1330, which was his first work. The chronicle, made for Rashid al-Din's son Ghiyath al-Din Muhammad, was a world history, narrating the events of the prophets, the pre-Islamic kings of Iran, and the Islamic world. Nothing is known of Mustawfi's life during the end of the Ilkhanate, except that he travelled between Tabriz and Baghdad.

In the summer of 1339, Mustawfi was at Sawa, working for Ghiyath al-Din Muhammad's son-in-law Hajji Shams al-Din Zakariya, who was the vizier of the Jalayirid ruler Hasan Buzurg (r. 1336–1356). There he tried to help with the management of the divan, but soon found himself unemployed after Hasan Buzurg's retreat to Baghdad due to a defeat by the Chobanid prince Hasan Kuchak. Mustawfi was ambivalent whether to return to his native Qazvin or flee to the much more secure southern Iran. He eventually choose to leave for the southern Iranian city of Shiraz to seek better fortunes, but was let down by the reception he received at the court of the Injuid ruler Amir Mas'ud Shah (r. 1338–1342).

Nevertheless, he remained there for ten months more, until he chose to leave due to the chaos that ensued during the Injuid dynastic struggle for the throne. He returned up north, where he was well received in Awa, Sawa, Kashan and Isfahan, finally returning to Qazvin at the end of 1340. He mentions the turmoil he went through during this period in several of his poems, and also went through illness (or possibly boredom), until he recouped after gaining sympathy from an unknown patron, possibly Hasan Buzurg. It was around this time that Mustawfi completed his cosmographical and geographical work Nuzhat al-Qulub ("Hearts' Bliss"). He died sometime after 1339/40 in Qazvin, where he was buried in a dome-shaped mausoleum.

== Works ==
=== Tarikh-i guzida ===
Mustawfi's first work was the Tarikh-i guzida ("Excerpt History"), a world history, narrating the events of the prophets, the pre-Islamic kings of Iran, and the Islamic world. Based on the then-incomplete Zafarnamah, the work was based on earlier sources, which are in a thorough manner credited by Mustawfi. Tarikh-i guzida contains important information after the death of the Ilkhanate monarch Ghazan in 1304. The political tale concludes in a positive tone, with Ghiyath al-Din Muhammad being appointed to vizierate of the Ilkhanate. The penultimate chapter contains describes the lives of distinguished scholars and poets, whilst the last describes Qazvin and gives a reportage of its history.

=== Zafarnamah ===
Mustawfi's second work was the Zafarnamah ("Book of Victory"), a continuation of Ferdowsi's Shahnameh ("Book of Kings"). Its name is a loan translation of the Middle Persian book Piruzinamak. He completed the work in 1334, consisting of 75,000 verses, reporting the history of the Islamic era up until the Ilkhanate era. Albeit the early part depends heavily on the work of Rashid al-Din (which Mustawfi also mentions), it is less noticeable compared to his Tarikh-i guzida. The work also has aspects which resemble that of the contemporary verse narrative, the Shahnameh-ye Chengizi, by Shams al-Din Kashani. Regardless, the Zafarnamah is a unique primary source for the reign of the Ilkhanate monarch Öljaitü (r. 1304–1316) and that of his successor, Abu Sa'id Bahadur Khan (r. 1316–1335). The importance of the work was acknowledged by the Timurid-era historian Hafiz-i Abru, who incorporated much of it in his Dhayl-e Jame al-tawarikh. Like the Tarikh-i guzida, the Zafarnamah has a positive conclusion, with Abu Sai'd Bahadur Khan successfully quelling a revolt, followed by peace. However, Mustawfi may have completed his work prematurely, possibly due to the chaotic events that followed during the disintegration of the Ilkhanate. This is supported by the fact he later composed a prose continuation of the Zafarnamah, which mentions Abu Sai'd Bahar Khan's death and the turmoil that followed in Iran.

=== Nuzhat al-qulub ===
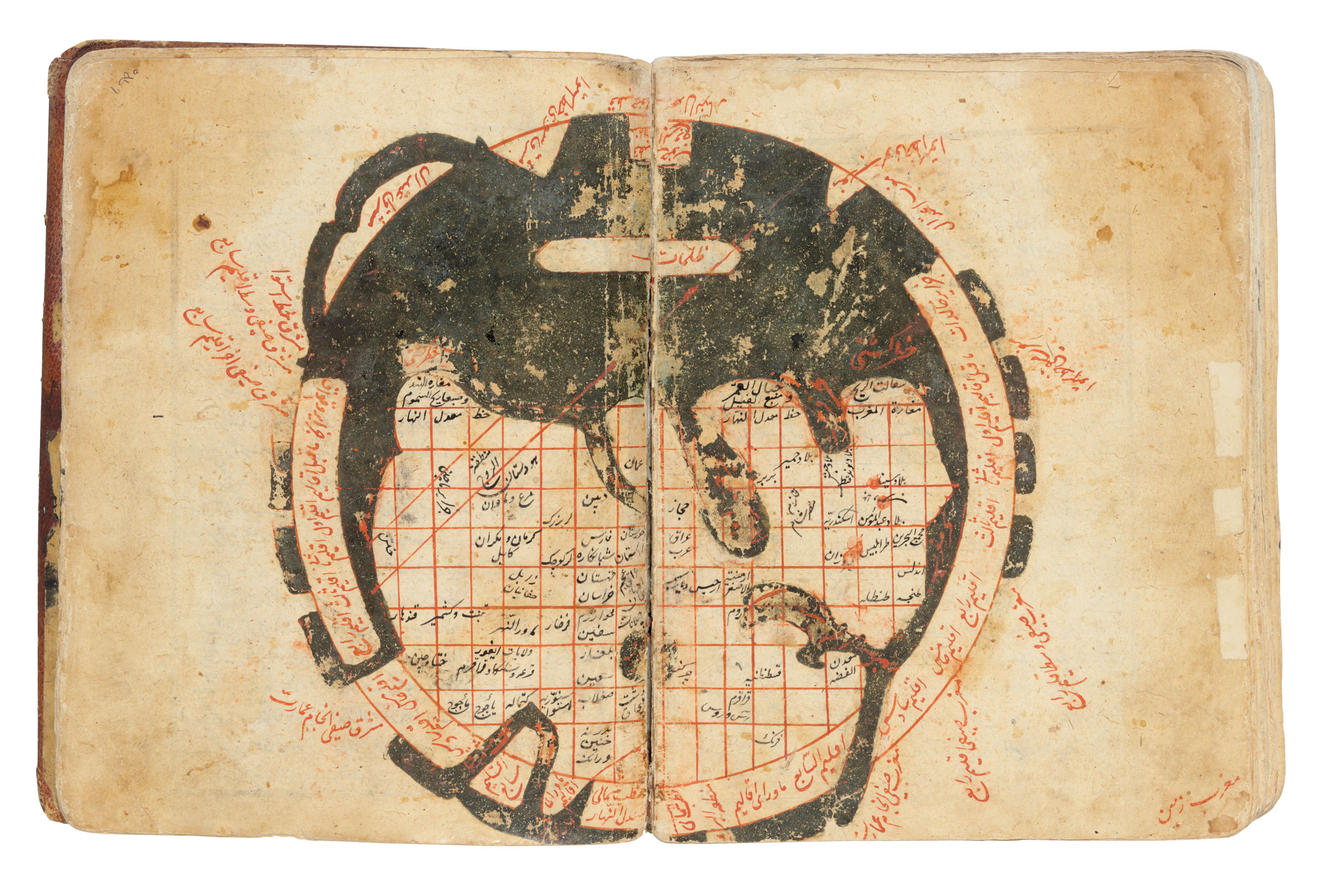
Map of the geography of Iran, based on a copy of the Nuzhat al-Qulub. Created in Safavid Iran on 18 October 1641

Mustawfi's most prominent work is the Nuzhat al-Qulub ("Hearts' Bliss"), which is virtually the only source to describe the geography and affairs of the Ilkhanate era. The source gives vital information about the government, commerce, economic life, sectarian conflicts, tax-collection and other similar topics. Just like his Tarikh-i guzida and Zafarnamah, Mustawfi rejects to have expertise in the field, and states that he was encouraged by his friends to write the work. He also thought that an available source in Persian would be helpful, due to most geographical sources about Iran being in Arabic (such as the works of Abu Zayd al-Balkhi and Ibn Khordadbeh).

The work is also considered a substantial contribution to the ethno-national history of Iran. Mustawfi notably uses the term "Iran" in his work. Since the fall of the Iranian Sasanian Empire in 651, the idea of Iran or Iranzamin ("the land of Iran") as a political entity had disappeared. However, it did remain as an element of the national sentiment of the Iranians, and was occasionally mentioned in the works of other people. With the advent of the Ilkhanate, the idea experienced a resurgence. According to the modern historian Peter Jackson (2017), the reason behind this resurgence was the fall of the Abbasid Caliphate in 1258 and the "relative disenfranchisement of political Islam." Mustawfi describes the borders of Iran extending from the Indus River to Khwarazm and Transoxiana in the east to Byzantium and Syria in the west, corresponding to the territory of the Sasanian Empire. He defines the provinces of Iran in 20 chapters; Iraq ("Arab Iraq") or the "heart of Iranshahr", Persian Iraq, Arran, Mughan, Shirvan, Georgia, Byzantium, Armenia, Rabi'a, Kurdistan, Khuzestan, Fars, Shabankara, Kirman, Mukran, Hormuz, Nimruz, Khorasan, Mazandaran, Qumis, Tabaristan and Gilan.

Since the 13th century, historians have followed this approach to Iran's history and geography.

== Beliefs ==
Hamdallah was reportedly a "convinced Shia", and there is much evidence that supports this claim, such as his detailed report of the history of the Twelve Imams in the Tarikh-i guzida, and that of the Shia neighborhoods in Iran in the Nuzhat al-Qulub. However, he disliked Shi'ites such as Sa'd al-Din Savaji, whom he refers to as a rafezi, and also the Shi'ite amir, Hajji al-Dilqandi, whom he condemned for omitting the first three caliphs in the khutba. The Iranologist Charles P. Melville suggests that Hamdallah may have in reality been a Sunni Shafi'ite, which was the predominant madhhab (school of thought) at the time in Qazvin, and also the school of thought of Rashid al-Din Hamadani.

== Sources ==
- Ashraf, Ahmad (2006). "Iranian identity iii. Medieval Islamic period". In Yarshater, Ehsan (ed.). Encyclopædia Iranica. Vol. XIII/5: Iran X. Religions in Iran–Iraq V. Safavid period. London and New York: Routledge & Kegan Paul. pp. 507–522. ISBN 978-0-933273-93-1.
- Hillenbrand, Carole (2007). Turkish Myth and Muslim Symbol: The Battle of Manzikert. Edinburgh University Press. pp. 1–304. ISBN 9780748625727. JSTOR 10.3366/j.ctt1r2bzf. (registration required)
- Kamola, Stefan (2019). Making Mongol History Rashid al-Din and the Jamiʿ al-Tawarikh. Edinburgh University Press. ISBN 978-1474421423.
- Komaroff, Linda (2012). Beyond the Legacy of Genghis Khan. Brill. pp. 1–678. ISBN 9789004243408.
- Jackson, Peter (2017). The Mongols and the Islamic World: From Conquest to Conversion. Yale University Press. pp. 1–448. ISBN 9780300227284. JSTOR j.ctt1n2tvq0. (registration required)
- Lane, George (2014). "Persian Notables and the Families Who Underpinned the Ilkhanate". Nomads as Agents of Cultural Change. Perspectives on the Global Past. University of Hawaii Press. pp. 182–213. doi:10.1515/9780824847890-011. ISBN 9780824847890.
- Melville, Charles (2003). "Ḥamd-Allāh Mostawfi". In Yarshater, Ehsan (ed.). Encyclopædia Iranica. Vol. XI/6: Ḥājj Sayyāḥ–Harem I. London and New York: Routledge & Kegan Paul. pp. 631–634. ISBN 978-0-933273-70-2.
- Melville, Charles (2012). Persian Historiography: A History of Persian Literature. Bloomsbury Publishing. ISBN 978-1845119119.
- Melville, Charles (2019). "Concepts of government and state formation in Mongol Iran". In Babaie, Sussan (ed.). Iran After the Mongols. Bloomsbury Publishing. pp. 1–320. ISBN 9781786736017.
- Spuler, B. (1971). "Ḥamd Allāh b. Abī Bakr b. Aḥmād b. Naṣr al-Mustawfī al-Ḳazwīnī". In Lewis, B.; Ménage, V. L.; Pellat, Ch. & Schacht, J. (eds.). The Encyclopaedia of Islam, Second Edition. Volume III: H–Iram. Leiden: E. J. Brill. OCLC 495469525.
