= Fakhr al-Din Mustawfi =

Persian statesman under the Ilkhanids (AD 13th century)

Sahib diwan of the Ilkhanate
- In office 1284–1286
- Preceded by: Shams al-Din Juvayni
- Succeeded by: Jalal al-Din Simnani

Personal details
- Died: 1290
- Relatives: Hamdallah Mustawfi (cousin)

Fakhr al-Din Mustawfi (died 1290) was a Persian statesman from the Mustawfi family of Qazvin, who lived during the early Ilkhanate era. He was the elder cousin of the distinguished historian and geographer Hamdallah Mustawfi.

According to Hamdallah Mustawfi, Fakhr al-Din Mustawfi enjoyed a flourishing career under the Ilkhanate—first as the ṣāḥib(-i) diwān (finance minister, vizier) of Gaykhatu during his governorship of Anatolia, and then later as bureaucrat under the Ilkhan Arghun Khan (r. 1284–1291). He played a role in the downfall of the Ilkhanate ṣāḥib diwān Shams al-Din Juvayni, being part of the circle of advisors around Arghun, who urged him to make Shams al-Din stand trial, on the accusation of poisoning Arghun's father Abaqa Khan (r. 1265–1282). On 16 October 1284, Shams al-Din was executed, with Fakhr al-Din gaining his previous post of ṣāḥib diwān.

Two years later, in 1286, however, he was replaced by Jalal al-Din Simnani and sent to govern Anatolia. In the same year, Fakhr al-Din instigated the execution of Shams al-Din's son Sharaf al-Din Harun Juvayni through hateful slander. Fakhr al-Din strengthened Shams al-Din's policy of increasing the Iranian influence in Anatolia, appointing "innumerable Tabrizis, Hamadanis, Iraqis, Khushkanis, Khurasanis, Georgians, Alans, Marandis, Nakhjawanis, Tiflisis and Arranis." This led to a closer connection between Anatolia and the Iranian intellectual and literary world.

Fakhr al-Din Mustawfi eventually fell out and favour and was executed in 1290. The instigator behind this was the new ṣāḥib diwān Sa'ad al-Dawla, who achieved this through the spread of defamation. This earned him the animosity of the Mustawfi family.

== Sources ==
- Komaroff, Linda (2012). Beyond the Legacy of Genghis Khan. Brill. pp. 1–678. ISBN 9789004243408.
- Jackson, Peter (2017). The Mongols and the Islamic World: From Conquest to Conversion. Yale University Press. pp. 1–448. ISBN 9780300227284. JSTOR j.ctt1n2tvq0. (registration required)
- Lane, George (2003). Early Mongol Rule in Thirteenth-Century Iran: A Persian Renaissance. Routledge. ISBN 978-0415297509.
- Lane, George (2014). "Persian Notables and the Families Who Underpinned the Ilkhanate". In Amitai, Reuven; Biran, Michal (eds.). Nomads as Agents of Cultural Change: The Mongols and Their Eurasian Predecessors. University of Hawai'i Press. pp. 182–213.
- Peacock, A. C. S. (2019). Islam, Literature and Society in Mongol Anatolia. Cambridge University Press. ISBN 978-1108499361.
