= Mugni =

The mugni (archlute) is a Persian stringed musical instrument which resembles a tar except that the two globes are connected and not separated like the tar's.

During Ghuri rulers and Khwarizmi (12th – 13th century) music grew. Two notable theorists of this era were Fakhr al-Din al-Razi and Nasir al-Din al-Tusi. Another Persian theorist was Qutb al-Din al-Shirazi who was famous for Pearl of Crown (Durrat al-taj). In the Treasure-House of Gift (Kanz al -Tahaf) an important work in 1350, ud (lute), rubab (lute), mughni (archlute), chang (harp), nuzhe, qanun (psaltery), Ghaychak (spiked viol), pisha (fife) and nay-i siyah (reedpipe) are completely described. In other places, dutar (two strings) and setar (three strings) exquisite of poet Hafez are mentioned.

== See also ==
- Safi al-Din al-Urmawi
