= Tomb of Hamdallah Mustawfi =

National heritage site in Iran

Coordinates: 36°15′51″N 50°00′38″E

Tomb of Hamdollah Mostowfi
- آرامگاه حمدالله مستوفی
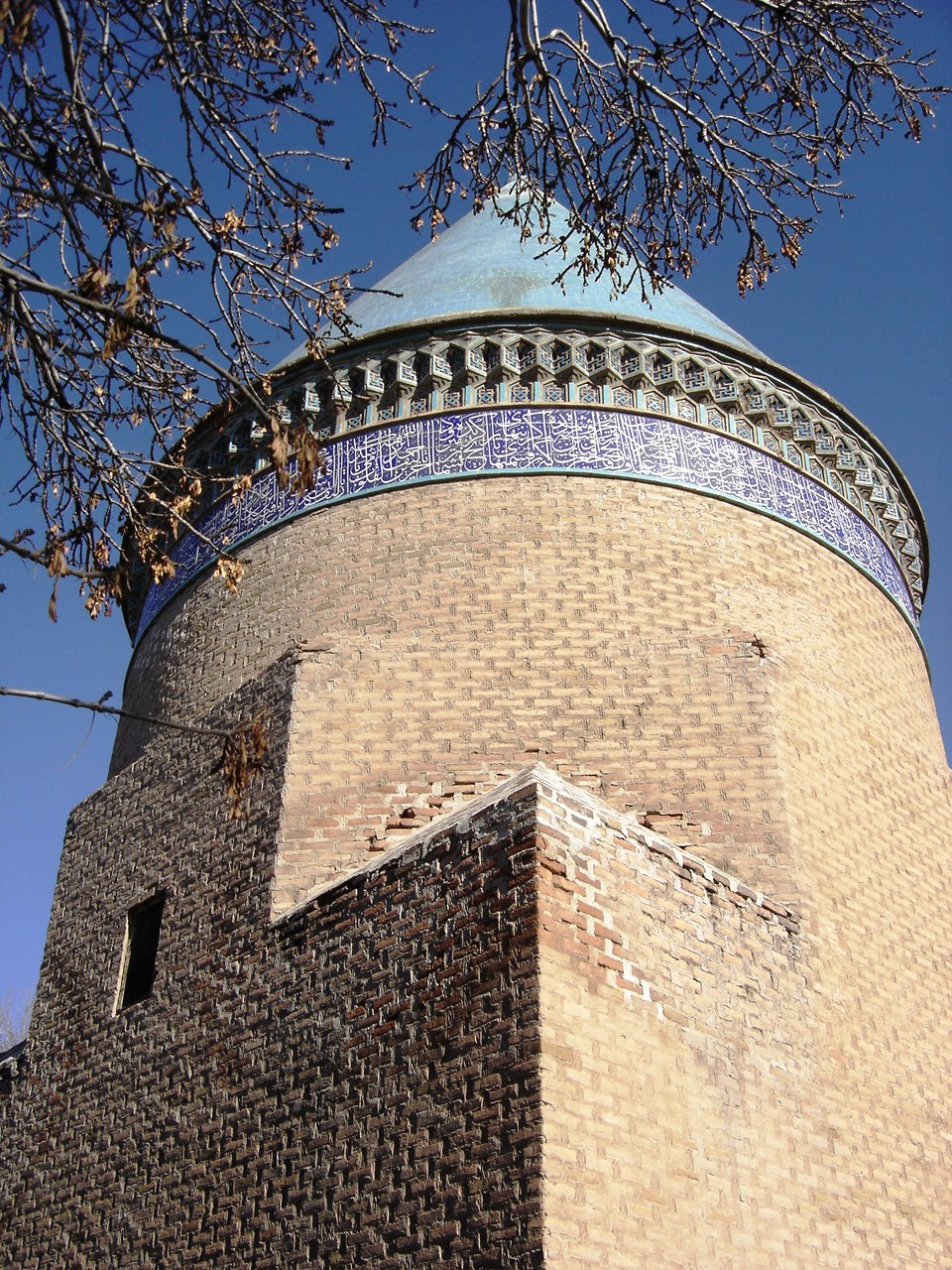
- Interactive map of Tomb of Hamdollah Mostowfi
- Location: Qazvin, Iran
- Dedicated to: Hamdallah Mustawfi

Iran National Heritage List
- Official name: Mausoleum of Hamdollah Mostowfi
- Type: Mausoleum
- Designated: 1940
- Reference no.: 332
- Conservation organization: Cultural Heritage, Handicrafts and Tourism Organization of Iran

The Tomb of Hamdallah Mustawfi (Persian: آرامگاه حمدالله مستوفی) is a 14th century mausoleum in Qazvin, Iran. The mausoleum belongs to Hamdallah Mustawfi. It has a square base and a conical roof. It was listed in Iran's national heritage sites with the number 332 on 10 February 1940.

== Gallery ==
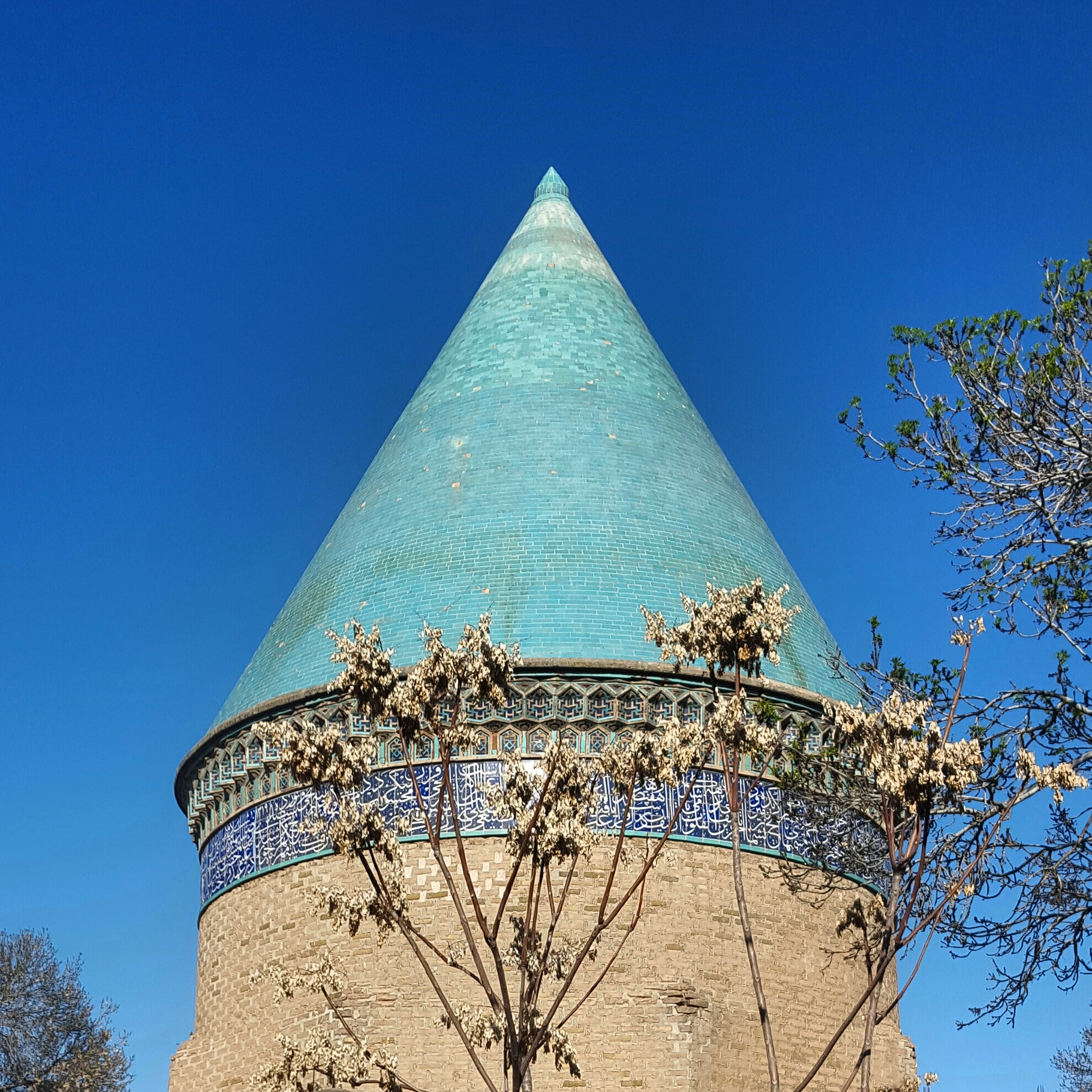

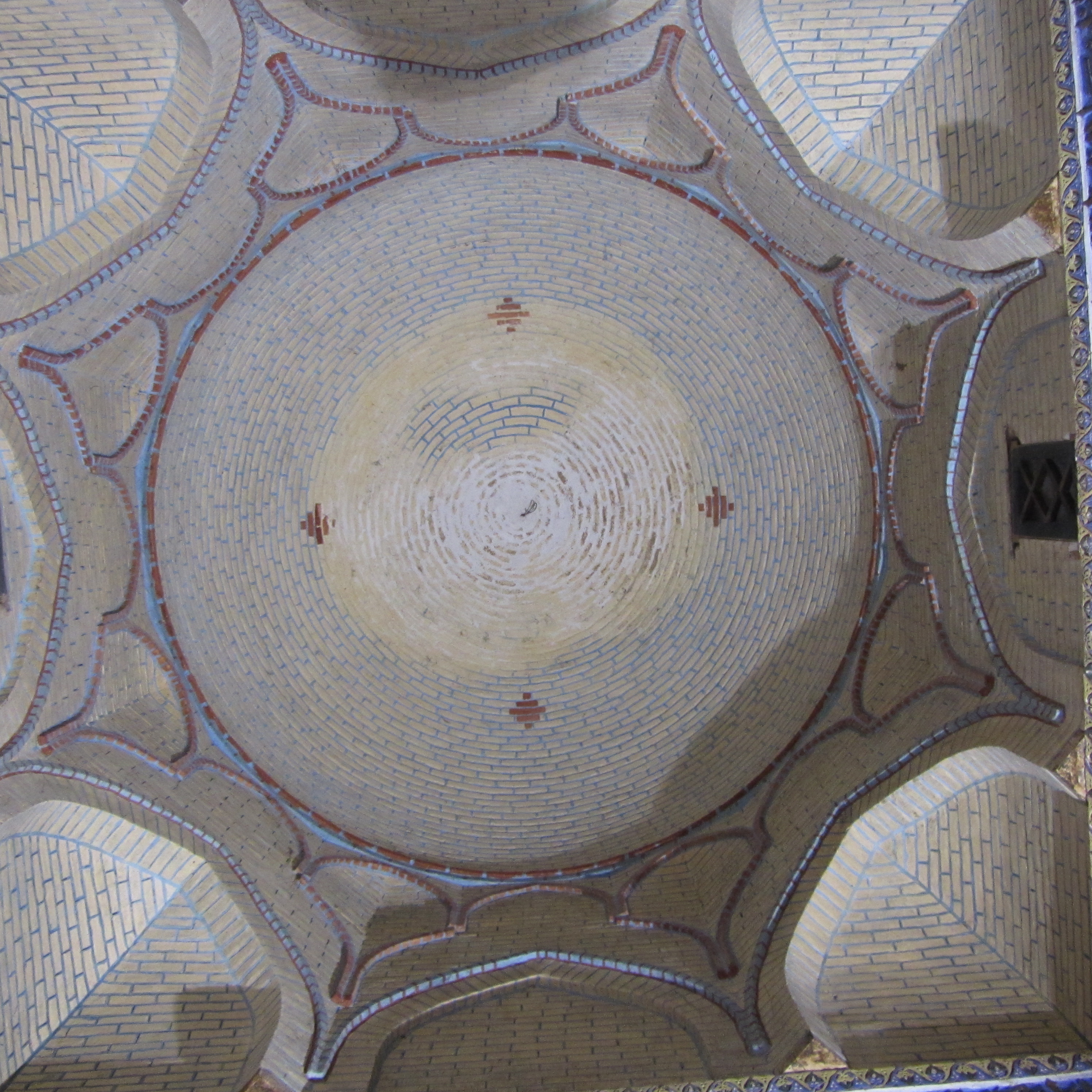
Ceiling
