= Tarikh-i guzida =

Compendium of Islamic history by Hamdallah Mustawfi

The Tarikh-i guzida (also spelled Tarikh-e Gozideh (Persian: تاریخ گزیده, "Excerpt history"), is a compendium of Islamic history from the creation of the world until 1329, written by Hamdallah Mustawfi and finished in 1330. It was written in a dry simple style and dedicated to Ghiyath al-Din Muhammad.

== Content ==
The Tarikh-i guzida contains the history of the Islamic world, from the creation of the world up to 1329 (729 AH). The introduction includes the creation of the world followed by six sections;

1. The prophets
2. Persian Kings before Muhammad
3. Muhammad and caliphs
4. Persia and other lands ruled by Muslim dynasties
5. Poets and scholars
6. Region and history of Kazwin (Qazvin)

Also mentioned is the Mongol invasion. Hamdallah produced a world map in the Tarikh-i guzida which contained meridians. Hamdallah declared the Afghans to be Israelites.

== Modern era ==
The Tarikh-i guzida was very popular and numerous copies existed, of which many were found in European collections. It was partially translated into French in 1903 by Jules Gantin. E.G. Browne published a complete edition in 1910 and an abridged English version in 1913. In 1960, Abd al-Husayn Nava'i published a complete version of the Tarikh-i guzida.

== Sources ==
- Babaie, Sussan (2019). Iran After the Mongols. Bloomsbury Publishing. pp. 1–320. ISBN 9781786736017.
- Hillenbrand, Carole (2007). Turkish Myth and Muslim Symbol: The Battle of Manzikert. Edinburgh University Press. pp. 1–304. ISBN 9780748625727. JSTOR 10.3366/j.ctt1r2bzf. (registration required)
- Komaroff, Linda (2012). Beyond the Legacy of Genghis Khan. Brill. pp. 1–678. ISBN 9789004243408.
- Melville, Charles (2003). "Ḥamd-Allāh Mostawfi". Encyclopaedia Iranica, Vol. XI, Fasc. 6. pp. 631–634.
- Melville, Charles (2012). Persian Historiography: A History of Persian Literature. Bloomsbury Publishing. pp. 1–784. ISBN 9780857723598.
- Spuler, Spuler (2012). "Ḥamd Allāh b. Abī Bakr b. Aḥmād b. Naṣr al-Mustawfī al-Ḳazwīnī". In Fleet, Kate; Krämer, Gudrun; Matringe, Denis; Nawas, John; Rowson, Everett (eds.). Encyclopaedia of Islam (3rd ed.). Brill Online. ISSN 1873-9830.
