= George E. Lane =

British historian

George E. Lane is a British historian and author.

After "many years living and working in the Middle East and Asia", some details of which appeared in 1980, in two editions of the British motorbike magazine “Bike”, Lane began studying at the School of Oriental and African Studies (SOAS) in 1991. He earned a bachelor's degree in history and Persian in 1994, a master's degree in history in 1996, and a PhD in history in 2001. He is a senior teaching fellow in History of the Middle East and Central Asia at the SOAS.

== Books ==
- Early Mongol Rule in Thirteenth-Century Iran: A Persian Renaissance (Routledge, 2003)
- Genghis Khan and Mongol Rule (Greenwood, 2004)
- Daily Life in the Mongol Empire (Greenwood, 2006)
- Lane, George, ed. (2018). The Mongols in Iran: Qutb Al-Din Shirazi's Akhbar-i Moghulan. Abingdon-on-Thames: Routledge. ISBN 9780367607043. (translated)
- The Phoenix Mosque and the Persians of Medieval Hangzhou (edited, Gingko Library, 2018)
- A Short History of the Mongols (IB Tauris, 2018)
