= Zafarnamah (Mustawfi) =

Epic poem written by the Persian poet Mostowfi

Zafarnamah (Persian: ظفرنامه, lit. 'Book of Victory') is an epic poem written by the Persian poet, historian, and geographer Hamdallah Mustawfi (d. 1334). The epic history, compiled in 75,000 couplets, explores Iranian history from the Arab conquest to the Mongols.

== Epic History and National Identity in Mustawfi’s Zafarnāmah ==
Hamdallah Mustawfi, in his Zafarnāmah, tried to recount the history of Iran in the form of an epic poem, showing the continuity of Iranian identity from the Sasanian era to the time of the Mongol Ilkhanids.

According to Charles Melville in the Encyclopaedia Iranica, the Zafarnāmah can be regarded as “a national history of Iran in verse,” blending Ferdowsi’s Shāhnāmeh tradition with Islamic historiography.

Linda Komaroff, in her book Beyond the Legacy of Genghis Khan, interprets the work as a cultural effort to redefine the concept of Iranian identity during the Mongol period.

Sussan Babaie believes that through the use of epic poetry and a historical perspective, Mustawfi positioned Mongol rule as a continuation of the Iranian historical narrative, thus contributing to the reconstruction of Iran’s cultural identity in the post-Mongol era.

== Sources ==
- Babaie, Sussan (2019). Iran After the Mongols. Bloomsbury Publishing. pp. 1–320. ISBN 9781786736017.
- Hillenbrand, Carole (2007). Turkish Myth and Muslim Symbol: The Battle of Manzikert. Edinburgh University Press. pp. 1–304. ISBN 9780748625727. JSTOR 10.3366/j.ctt1r2bzf. (registration required)
- Komaroff, Linda (2012). Beyond the Legacy of Genghis Khan. Brill. pp. 1–678. ISBN 9789004243408.
- Melville, Charles (2003). "Ḥamd-Allāh Mostawfi". Encyclopaedia Iranica, Vol. XI, Fasc. 6. pp. 631–634.
- Melville, Charles (2012). Persian Historiography: A History of Persian Literature. Bloomsbury Publishing. pp. 1–784. ISBN 9780857723598.
- Spuler, Spuler (2012). "Ḥamd Allāh b. Abī Bakr b. Aḥmād b. Naṣr al-Mustawfī al-Ḳazwīnī". In Fleet, Kate; Krämer, Gudrun; Matringe, Denis; Nawas, John; Rowson, Everett (eds.). Encyclopaedia of Islam (3rd ed.). Brill Online. ISSN 1873-9830.
