= Sharaf al-Din Harun Juvayni =

Sharaf al-Din Harun Juvayni (Persian: شرف الدین هارون جوینی; also spelled Joveyni) was a Persian statesman and poet from the Juvayni family. He was the son of Shams al-Din Juvayni.

He was executed in either July or August 1286 due to a defamation by Fakhr al-Din Mustawfi, who was a cousin of the historian and geographer Hamdallah Mustawfi.

== Sources ==
- Biran, Michal (2009). "JOVAYNI, ṢĀḤEB DIVĀN". Encyclopaedia Iranica, Vol. XV, Fasc. 1. pp. 71–74.
- Rajabzadeh, Hashem (2009). "JOVAYNI FAMILY". Encyclopaedia Iranica, Vol. XV, Fasc. 1. pp. 61–63.
- Ashraf, Ahmad (2006). "Iranian identity iii. Medieval Islamic period". Encyclopaedia Iranica, Vol. XIII, Fasc. 5. pp. 507–522.
