= Shams al-Din Juvayni =

13th century Persian statesman and Mongol vizier

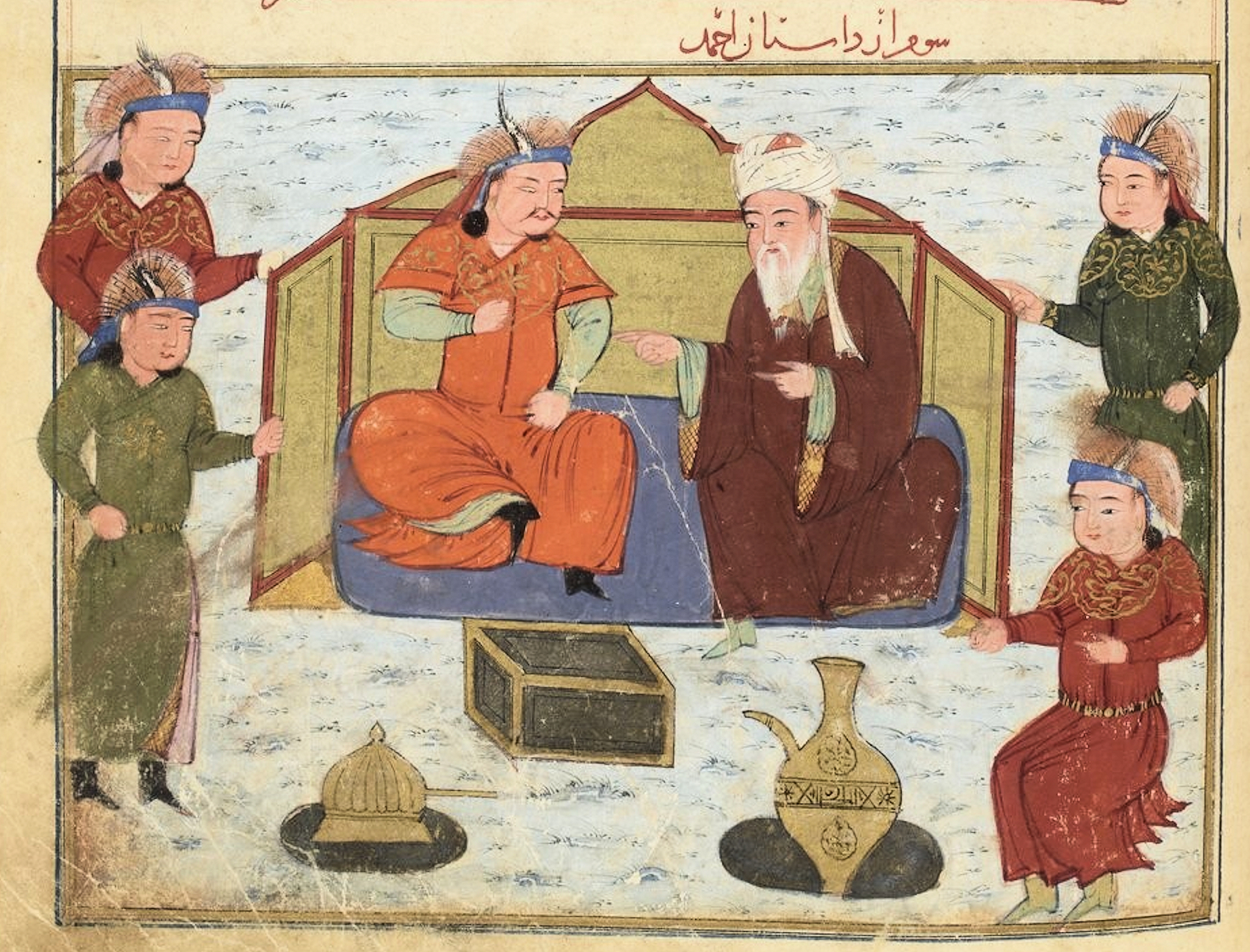
- Tekuder and Shams al-Din in a 1430 miniature

Sahib-i divan of the Ilkhanate
- In office 1263–1284
- Preceded by: Unknown
- Succeeded by: Fakhr al-Din Mustawfi

Personal details
- Died: 16 October 1284 (aged 58) near Ahar, Azerbaijan, Ilkhanid Iran
- Spouse: Khoshak Zakarian
- Children: 2, including Sharaf al-Din Harun
- Relatives: Juvayni family

Shams al-Din Juvayni (Persian: شمس‌الدین جوینی; also spelled Joveyni) was a Persian statesman and member of the Juvayni family. He was an influential figure in early Ilkhanate politics, serving as sahib-i divan (vizier and minister of finance) under four Mongol Ilkhans – Hulagu, Abaqa, Tekuder and Arghun Khan. In 1284, Arghun accused Shams al-Din of having poisoned the Ilkhan Abaqa, who may actually have died of the effects of alcoholism; Shams al-Din was duly executed and replaced as vizier by Buqa. A skillful political and military leader, Shams al-Din is also known to have patronized the arts. The musician Safi al-Din al-Urmawi was one of those he supported.

== Background ==
A native of Juvayn in Khorasan, Shams al-Din belonged to the namesake Juvaynis, a Persian family of officials and scholars, that claimed ancestry from al-Fadl ibn al-Rabi' (d. 823/4), who had served in high offices under the Abbasid caliph Harun al-Rashid (r. 786–809). The family had previously worked for the Seljuk and Khwarazmian empires before serving the Mongol Empire and its breakaway state, the Ilkhanate. Shams al-Din's father, Baha al-Din Muhammad, originally an official of the last Khwarazmshah, Jalal al-Din Mangburni (r. 1220–1231), began working for the Mongol governor (basqaq) of Khorasan and Mazandaran, Chin Temür, becoming his saheb-i divan in 1235, a post which he held until his death in 1253/4.

Shams al-Din was also the younger brother of the historian Ata-Malik Juvayni, who wrote the Tarikh-i Jahangushay ("History of the World Conqueror"). His family is generally portrayed as Shafi‘ites like its ancestor, al-Juvayni.

== Biography ==
In 1263, Hulagu Khan (r. 1256–1265) appointed Shams al-Din as his sahib-i divan. The reason behind his rising influence may have been his friendship with Nasir al-Din al-Tusi, the famed scholar and Hulagu's close advisor, and his marriage to the daughter of the Mongol governor of Khorasan, Arghun Aqa. Shams al-Din's influence soon increased even further; he received the governorship of Tabriz and played a prominent role in rebuilding Iran, which had suffered greatly from the Mongol conquest. He had a bridge constructed in Azerbaijan and a dam near Saveh, rebuilt mosques in Iraq, and supported the opening of Hajj passages. Shams al-Din also took part in deciding military conclusions; he gave instructions to Hulagu's son and successor Abaqa (r. 1265–1282) before the battle of Herat in 1270 against the Chagatai Khanate, and later in 1277 was the head of an army that participated in Abaqa's expedition into Anatolia, where he made Abaqa's army spare Muslim villages and towns in Anatolia. He also clashed with Caucasian tribes on his return to Iran.

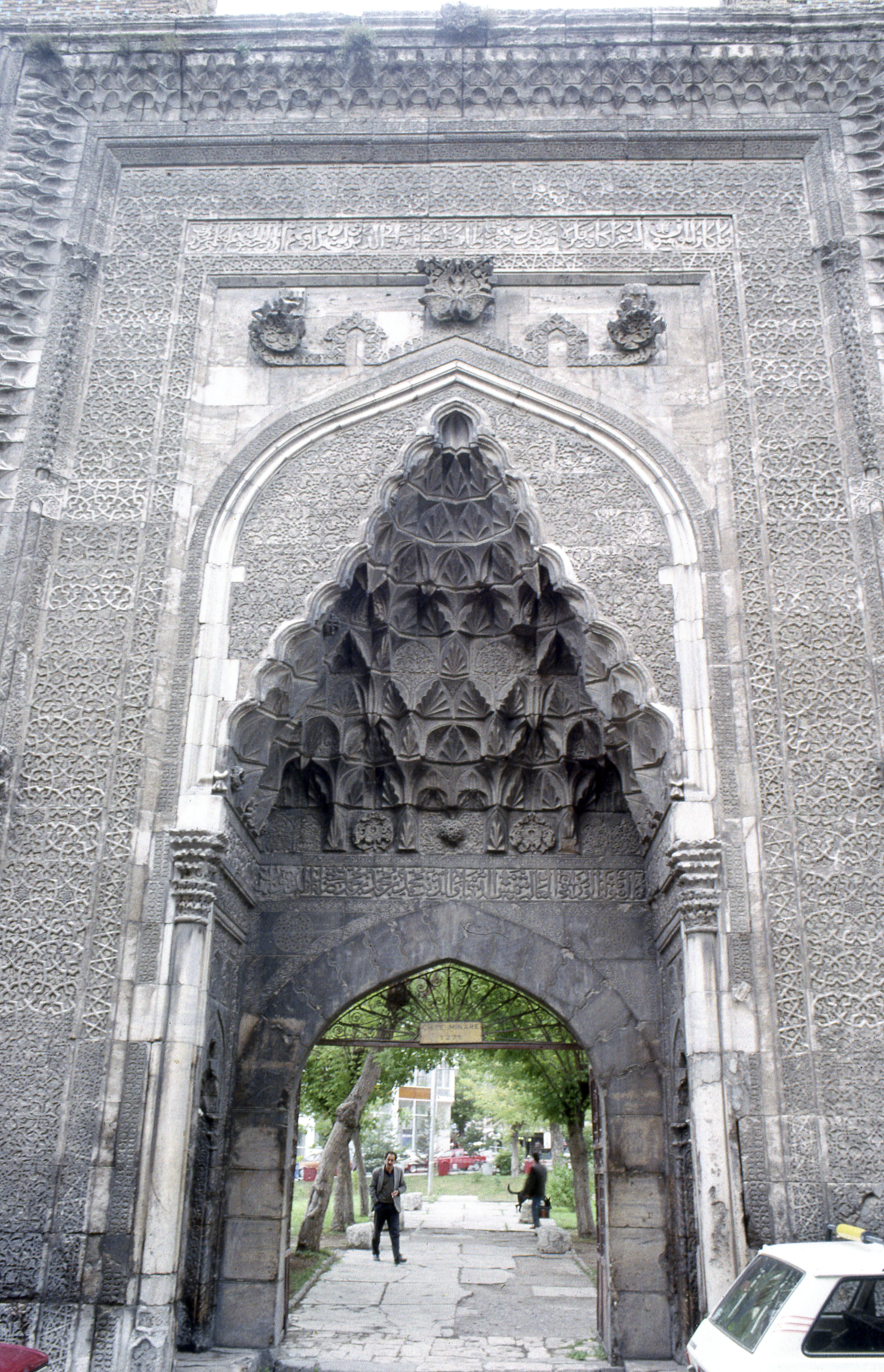
Shams al-Din Juvayni commissioned the Çifte Minareli Medrese in Sivas, Anatolia, in AH 670 (1271-1272 CE).

Shams al-Din was also closely linked with the local vassal states of the Ilkhanids, such as the Kartids of Herat, the Qutlugh-Khanids of Kerman, the Salghurids of Fars, and the Hazaraspids of Luristan. He maintained Ilkhanid bureaucrats in each realm, and had a representative in charge of the rejuvenation of the Yazd area. Furthermore, he also increased the influence and authority of his family by giving them posts within the country; his eldest son Baha al-Din Muhammad was appointed governor of Persian Iraq, whilst another son of his, Sharaf al-Din Harun Juvayni, was appointed governor of Anatolia. Shams al-Din's older brother Ata-Malik Juvayni had already been given the governorship of Iraq in 1259 before the latter's rise.

During his term as sahib-i divan, Shams al-Din amassed a hefty sum of revenue, mainly in properties, but also through marketable investments in Hormuz, which greatly profited Shams al-Din and his associate, Sunjaq, who served as joint vizier under Abaqa. Shams al-Din's illustrious career resulted in much resentment; in 1277, his former apprentice Majd al-Mulk Yazdi accused Shams al-Din and Ata-Malik Juvayni of secretly collaborating with the Mamluk Sultanate of Egypt, which proved unsuccessful due to the lack of proof. However, three years later, Majd al-Molk made a more successful attempt; he not only once again accused the brothers of collaborating with the Mamluks, but also stealing hefty amount of riches from the treasury. Whilst Shams al-Din avoided punishment with the help of Hulagu's widow, his brother Ata-Malik was arrested, but later released in late 1281 due to interference of Mongol princes and princesses, only to return to jail a few months later due being the target of further accusations. The accusations towards Shams al-Din also made Abaqa appoint Majd al-Mulk as his joint vizier, which considerably reduced Shams al-Din's authority.

A dynastic struggle followed after Abaqa's death in 1282 between his younger brother Tekuder and son Arghun.

Juvayni married the Armenian Princess Khoshak Zakarian in 1269. She was the daughter of Avag Zakarian, Lord High Constable of Georgia, and Gvantsa, a noblewoman who went on to become queen of Georgia. Juvayni and Khoshak had a girl named Kuandze, who married the Armenian Prince Shahnshah II Zakarian, and two sons named Zakare and Atabeg.

== Sources ==
- Jackson, Peter (2017). The Mongols and the Islamic World: From Conquest to Conversion. Yale University Press. pp. 1–448. ISBN 9780300227284. JSTOR 10.3366/j.ctt1n2tvq0. (registration required)
- Lane, George (2003). "Early Mongol rule in Thirteenth-century Iran". Routledge: 1–330.
- Biran, Michal (2009). "JOVAYNI, ṢĀḤEB DIVĀN". Encyclopaedia Iranica, Vol. XV, Fasc. 1. pp. 71–74.
- Rajabzadeh, Hashem (2009). "JOVAYNI FAMILY". Encyclopaedia Iranica, Vol. XV, Fasc. 1. pp. 61–63.
- Ashraf, Ahmad (2006). "Iranian identity iii. Medieval Islamic period". Encyclopaedia Iranica, Vol. XIII, Fasc. 5. pp. 507–522.
- Timothy May (7 November 2016). The Mongol Empire: A Historical Encyclopedia [2 volumes]: A Historical Encyclopedia. ABC-CLIO. pp. 1–636. ISBN 978-1-61069-340-0.
- Lambton, Ann K. S. (2016). Continuity and Change in Medieval Persia. I.B.Tauris. pp. 1–425. ISBN 9780887061332.
