= Juvayni family =

Persian family native to the Juvayn area in Khorasan, Iran

The Juvayni family was a Persian family native to the Juvayn area in Khorasan. The most famous members were Shams al-Din Juvayni (d. 1284) and his elder brother Ata-Malik Juvayni (d. 1283). The family was known for patronizing scholars and poets, such as Saadi Shirazi and Nasir al-Din al-Tusi.

The family claimed ancestry from al-Fadl ibn al-Rabi' (d. 823/4), who had served in high offices under the Abbasid caliph Harun al-Rashid (r. 786–809). The family worked for many different dynasties during its heyday, such as the Ziyarids, Seljuks, Khwarazmians, and the Ilkhanate.

== Notable members ==
- al-Juwayni, Sunni Shafi'i jurist and mutakallim theologian
- Muntajab al-Din Badi Juvayni, divan-i insha (royal secretariat) of Ahmad Sanjar (r. 1118–1157)
- Baha al-Din Muhammad ibn Ali Juvayni, poet during the reign of the Khwarazmshah Il-Arslan (r. 1156–1172)
- Shams al-din Muhammad ibn Muhammad Juvayni, state treasurer (mustawfi) of the Khwarazmshah Ala al-Din Muhammad II (r. 1200–1220) and his son Jalal al-Din Mangburni (r. 1220–1231)
- Baha al-Din Muhammad ibn Muhammad Juvayni, bureaucrat under the Khwarazmian and Ilkhanate dynasties
- Ata-Malik Juvayni, Ilkhanate governor of Iraq
- Shams al-Din Juvayni, sahib-i divan (vizier and minister of finance) of the Ilkhanate from 1263 to 1284
- Baha al-Din Muhammad Juvayni, Ilkhanate governor of Persian Iraq and Yazd
- Sharaf al-Din Harun Juvayni, poet and governor of Ilkhanate Anatolia

== Sources ==
- Jackson, Peter (2017). The Mongols and the Islamic World: From Conquest to Conversion. Yale University Press. pp. 1–448. ISBN 9780300227284. JSTOR 10.3366/j.ctt1n2tvq0. (registration required)
- Lane, George (2009). "JOVAYNI, ʿALĀʾ-AL-DIN". Encyclopaedia Iranica, Vol. XV, Fasc. 1. pp. 63–68.
- Lane, George (2021). "Juwaynī family". In Fleet, Kate; Krämer, Gudrun; Matringe, Denis; Nawas, John; Rowson, Everett (eds.). Encyclopaedia of Islam (3rd ed.). Brill Online. ISSN 1873-9830.
- Biran, Michal (2009). "JOVAYNI, ṢĀḤEB DIVĀN". Encyclopaedia Iranica, Vol. XV, Fasc. 1. pp. 71–74.
- Rajabzadeh, Hashem (2009). "JOVAYNI FAMILY". Encyclopaedia Iranica, Vol. XV, Fasc. 1. pp. 61–63.
- Ashraf, Ahmad (2006). "Iranian identity iii. Medieval Islamic period". Encyclopaedia Iranica, Vol. XIII, Fasc. 5. pp. 507–522.
- Lambton, Ann K. S. (2016). Continuity and Change in Medieval Persia. I.B.Tauris. pp. 1–425. ISBN 9780887061332.
