= Charles P. Melville =

British academic (born 1951)

- Born: 10 May 1951 (age 75); London, England
- Education: University of Cambridge (BA; PhD); SOAS, University of London (MA)
- Scientific career
- Fields: Persian history
- Workplaces: University of Cambridge; Imperial College

Charles P. Melville (born 10 May 1951) is a British academic who has been Professor of Persian History at the University of Cambridge since 2008. He is the President of the British Institute of Persian Studies. He was one of the editors of The Cambridge History of Iran (volume 7) and History of Literature of Iran. He was educated in childhood at Wellington College before reading Arabic and Persian at Pembroke College, Cambridge; he went on to complete an M.A. in Islamic history at SOAS and a Ph.D. on historical seismicity in Iran.

He was a research assistant at Imperial College (1974–82) and Assistant Lecturer in Oriental Studies at Cambridge. He has been a Professor of Persian History since 2008 and is an Emeritus Fellow at Pembroke College.

He is married to fellow academic Dr Firuza Abdullaeva.

== Publications ==
- Every Inch a King: Comparative studies on kings and kingship in the ancient and medieval worlds, Leiden 2012
- Persian Historiography. A History of Persian Literature X, London 2012.
- The Russian perception of Khayyam: from text to image

== See also ==
- Jacques Duchesne-Guillemin
- Ilya Gershevitch
- Full interview whilst participating in the documentary LOVE AND DEVOTION
