= Ali Padshah =

14th-century Mongol general and kingmaker

Governor of Diyar Bakr
- In office 1332–1336
- Appointed by: Abu Sa'id Bahadur Khan
- Preceded by: Sutay
- Succeeded by: Haji Taghay

Personal details
- Died: July 24, 1336 Zilan valley, Ilkhanate (modern-day Turkey)

Military service
- Battles/wars: Siege of Al-Rahba; Battle of Zanjanrud; Battle of Jaghatu; Battle of Qara Darra

Ali Padshah (died July 24, 1336) was a Mongol emir of Ilkhanate, leader of the Oirats, governor of Diyarbakir, and later a kingmaker.

== Early years and background ==
He came from a powerful Oirat family who established good connections with Borjigids, especially the Hulagu Khan's family. His father Chechek (or Chichak) a mingghan commander under Gaykhatu, Baydu, Ghazan and Öljaitü. His mother Tödögech (or Todoqaj) was a daughter of Hulagu, who earlier married to Chechek's father Sulamish and grandfather Tengiz. Tengiz was described as a relative of Qutuqa Beki, however exact degree of kinship is unknown. Ali Padshah had at least two brothers: Muhammad beg and Hafez. His sister Hajji Khatun was married to Öljaitü, giving birth to his son Abu Said Bahadur.

Sources first mention Ali Padshah as a young soldier in Öljaitü's Gilan campaign of 1307, fighting under Uyghur emir Sevinch. He also participated in Siege of Al-Rahba in 1313. Later, he was ordered to accompany his nephew and heir to Oljaitü, Abu Said to Khorasan in 1315.

== Under Abu Said ==
Following Öljaitü's death 16 December 1316, 'Ali returned to capital together with new ilkhan. He was elevated to the rank of emir according to Khvandamir's Muiz al-Ansab together with his brother Muhammad beg. Together, they commanded left wing of the army when new Abu Said and Chupan was moving against Qurumushi and Irinjin's rebel army on 13 July 1319 in the battle of Zanjanrud. As a result, rebels were crushed and Muhammad beg was given a hand of Qurumushi's widow - Qutlug Malik, the daughter of Gaikhatu.

After Abu Said fell out with Chupan in 1327, he commenced a purge against Chupanid clan throughout the empire. Soon he was ordered to track down Chupan's son Dimashq Khwāja with Öljaitü's widow Kunjuskab Khatun and a Greek emir Khwaja Lu’lu’, who was eventually killed. His brother, Muhammad Beg also deserted Chupan near Ray, taking 30.000 soldiers with him, leaving Chupan no choice but to retreat to Herat where he was murdered as well. As a result, Muhammad was assigned as viceroy of Anatolia, while 'Ali was given tümen of Baghdad.

Soon, in May 1329, rumours spread that the Tarmashirin was planning to attack Khorasan and reinforcements were requested urgently. While preparations were underway, new governor of Khorasan, Narin Taghay (grandson of Kitbuqa), got into a dispute with Kartid emir Ghiyath-uddin ibn Rukn-uddin. Claiming that his domain fell under his jurisdiction, Narin tried to assert control over Herat. Abu Said immediately tasked Ali Padshah and Muhammad bey alongside emir Tashtimur (a nephew of Taghachar) to punish Narin Taghay. The army left Erbil on 10 June 1329, but stopped near Soltaniyeh after Narin panicked and sent messages claiming the threat of invasion had been exaggerated. The generals stopped advancing and planned to return. But Abu Sa'id insisted they continue. Ali Padishah hesitated, suggesting their presence might create more conflict. Believing that court factions were trying to sideline them, Ali Padishah and the other generals advanced toward Ujan, where the Ilkhan had relocated. In response, Abu Sa'id deployed Sheikh Ali to intercept them with orders to turn back. Concurrently, the Ilkhan's mother, Hajji Khatun, advised his brother Ali Padishah to avoid confrontation. The generals were intercepted at Heshtrud, where they expressed a desire to present themselves at court before continuing their mission.

To prevent further escalation, Abu Said sent Greek emir Khwaja Lu’lu’ with 5,000 troops to block their route. Meanwhile, several officers in the rebel contingent defected and informed the Ilkhan of the generals’ intentions. In reaction, Abu Sa'id removed them from their commands and ordered them to serve under Narin Togai in Khorasan. After intercession by Hajji Khatun, Abu Sa'id agreed to exile Ali Padishah to his own camp near Baghdad. He rebuked the generals, citing Ali Padishah's inexperience, Muhammed Bey's impulsiveness, and Tashtimur's unexpected failure in leadership. Muhammed Bey was ordered to Khorasan; Tashtimur was summoned for investigation. Other implicated officers, including Ibrahim Shah and Haji Taghay, both descendants of viceroy of Diyar Bakr - Sutay, were also pardoned but ordered to reside with their father.

Meanwhile, Narin headed toward the capital in an attempt to mitigate the consequences of his misrule. He invited Ali Padishah along Tashtimur to persuade Abu Sa'id to dismiss his vizier Ghiyas al-Din, son of Rashid al-Din, believing Ghiyas al-Din's enforcement of central authority hampered his autonomy. Should he fail, the conspirators intended to seize power by force and later seek retroactive approval from the Ilkhan. However, plot failed and both Narin and Tashtimur were sentenced to death under pressure from Baghdad Khatun, who held them responsible for the deaths of her father and brothers. Execution was carried out on 29 July 1329. Their residences were looted, and officials were sent to confiscate their provincial estates. Ali Padishah, protected by Ilkhan's mother, was disgraced but not executed.

=== Lord of Diyar Bakr ===
In 1332, viceroy of Diyar Bakr, Sutay died. Ali Padshah returned to favor and appointed as his successor and turned the region into Oirat powerbase. However, Sutay's son Haji Taghay in Akhlat rebelled against this appointment, but was defeated by the new governor. ʿAlī Pādshāh was noted in contemporary chronicles as a devout Muslim, with sources recording his destruction of local churches. His conflict with Hajji Taghay—who is reported to have been Christian—appears to have carried a religious dimension alongside its political basis. This religious antagonism likely compounded the rivalry between the two leaders. Meanwhile, Ali Padshah married his daughter to Ibrahimshah, a nephew and rival of Haji Taghay.

== As kingmaker ==
When Abu Said Bahadur Khan died on November 30, 1335, he left no sons, but his wife Dilshad Khatun was pregnant and expected a child to be born in May 1336. Until the birth of the child, factions maneuvered to impose themselves, and at the ordo that was held after the Ilkhan's death, the amirs proposed a temporary ruler until the emirs decided who would be chosen. The vizier Ghiyas al-Din Muhammad claimed that the late khan had designated Arpa Ke'un, a descendant of Ariq Böke, as heir. According to Hafiz-i Abru, the opposition of Ali Padshah and his family to Arpa Khan's accession was driven by a longstanding feud between the houses of Ariq Böke and Tengiz Güregen. This enmity dated back to the reign of Möngke Khan and resurfaced during the Ilkhanid succession crisis. The dynastic rivalry translated into political conflict at the time of Arpa's enthronement.

Soon, he found an opportunity to confront Arpa. The pregnant Dilshad Khatun had fled to Baghdad and placed herself under the protection of Ali Padshah, who became her guardian, supposedly to defend the rights of the unborn child (if it was male). In the meantime, Ali Padshah raised a grandson of Baydu - Musa as a puppet Ilkhan against Arpa Khan. Ali Padshah also contacted with the Mamluk Sultan al-Nāṣir Muḥammad who was half-Mongol himself, promising him Baghdad. Sides met on the battle of Jaghatu on April 29/30 of 1336, which was a disastrous end for Arpa Khan even though he had more numerous forces when 5-6 tümens changed sides. Both Arpa Khan and his vizier were captured and executed.

Meanwhile, Dilshad gave birth to a daughter and refused to enthrone the child, which paved way for securing the throne for Musa who was enthroned on 6 May 1336. Musa's vizier was Jamal Haji ibn Taj al-Din Ali Shirvani, who had Ali Padshah's confidence. Now the opposition to Musa was centered in Anatolia, where Hasan Buzurg, who had declared his neutrality between Arpa and Musa without recognizing either of them, was seen as the main enemy.

Having established control over Ujan in Tabriz, 'Ali Padshah began military operations, sending Sultanšāh b. Nikruz (brother of Qoṭb-al-Din Jahānšāh Nikruz of Kerman) to plunder Rashidaddin's quarter. These moves prompted defections among emirs, some joining Shaikh Hasan Buzurg, the former ulus amir and now a rival power contender. Arpa's supporters - Hajji Taghay (son of Sutay), with his sons and brothers, joined Shaikh Hasan along with Hajji Tughnak and Muhammad (descendant of Mulay, governor of Khorasan). Initially, Shaikh Hasan sought a negotiated settlement and sent his atabeg, Tashtimur Aqa, to mediate. Offer was to make a new kurultai and select a common choice for ilkhan position. However, Tashtimur was arrested upon arrival at Ali Padshah's camp, and a secret message was sent back indicating the agreement was void. Realising the breach, Shaikh Hasan proclaimed a new Ilkhan, a child named Pir Husayn from Möngke Temür's lineage, under the regnal name Muhammad Khan, on 20 July 1336.

A compromise was attempted between the two factions that did not succeed, and finally the battle was fought on 24 July 1336, at Qara Dara near Aladagh, resulting in victory for Hasan Burzurg and his protégé Muhammad Khan. The pursuing Georgian forces of Botso Tsmedisdze captured Ali Padshah and brought him before Shaikh Hasan, who had taken position on a nearby hill. There, 'Ali Padshah was executed. In contrast, other sources provide differing accounts, suggesting that 'Ali Padishah was killed in the field by arrows and daggers without being taken captive. Mamluk army arrived very late and returned to Egypt.

He lost his power base to Haji Taghay, who established a dynastic rule in Diyar Bakr, including Mosul and Akhlat. Hasan Buzurg on the other hand secured Baghdad. A significant number of Oirat forces, led by Ali Padshah's brother Muhammad bey and supported by Maḥmūd ibn Isan Qutlugh, continued to resist. In early 1337, they aligned with Togha Temür, a descendant of Jochi Qasar (Genghis Khan’s brother), who was proclaimed Ilkhan in Khorasan. Muhammad was soon killed by Kurds alongside his wife after defeat of Musa Khan. Hasan Buzurg married his daughter in 1338 to receive diminished Oirat support. His brother Hafez also joined Hasan Buzurg while Ali Padshah's son Hajji went to seek asylum from Sayf al-Din Tankiz. Oirats never recovered after this point and faded from Iranian politics.

== Ancestry ==
Ancestors of Ali Padshah

Tengiz
Sulamish
Chechek
Ali Padshah
Tolui
Hulegu Khan
Sorghaghtani Beki
Tödegech Khatun
Chigu of the Khongirad
Qutui Khatun
Tümelün

== Sources ==
- Howorth, Henry H. (Henry Hoyle) (1880). History of the Mongols from the 9th to the 19th century. Robarts - University of Toronto. London : Longmans, Green.
- van Loon, Johannes Baptist (1954), Tarikh-i Shaikh Uways, The Hague: Mouton & Co., OCLC 468650590
