= Battle of Qara Darra =

1336 battle for Ilkhanate throne

Battle of Qara Darra (1336)
- Part of the Disintegration of the Ilkhanate
Date	24 July 1336
Location	Zilan valley, Ilkhanate (modern-day Turkey) 39.17°N 43.30°E
Result	Victory for the Jalayirid faction: Muhammad Khan proclaimed as Ilkhan

Belligerents
Faction of Muhammad Khan; Jalayirids; Sutayids; Chupanids	Faction of Musa Khan; Oirat tribe

Commanders and leaders
Hasan Buzurg; Hajji Taghay; Surghan; Shaikh Muhammad Maulayad; Emir Ilkan; Botso Tsmedisdze (DOW)	Musa Khan; 'Ali Padshah (executed); Ögrünch; Maḥmūd ibn Isan Qutlugh; Sultanšāh Nikruz
- Location within Turkey

The Battle of Qara Darra was fought on 24 July 1336 between two rival Mongol factions competing for control of the Ilkhanate throne following the death of Abu Sa'id in 1335. The confrontation took place in the vicinity of Van and marked a key episode in the collapse of central Ilkhanid authority.

== Prelude to Battle ==
The death of Ilkhan Abu Sa'id without an heir led to a succession crisis within the Ilkhanate. Several military commanders and regional elites attempted to install their own claimants to the throne. By mid-1336, two major factions had emerged: one led by Emir 'Ali Padshah and Musa Khan, and the other by Shaykh Hasan Buzurg, a senior statesman and son-in-law of the former emir Chupan.

Following the defeat of Arpa Ke'un in the Battle of Jaghatu (29 April 1336), 'Ali Padishah emerged as the dominant figure in western Iran. Having established control over Ujan in Tabriz, 'Ali Padshah began military operations, sending Sultanšāh Nikruz (brother of Qoṭb-al-Din Jahānšāh Nikruz of Kerman) to plunder Rashidaddin's quarter. These moves prompted defections among emirs, some joining Shaikh Hasan Buzurg, the former ulus amir and now a rival power contender. Arpa's supporters - Hajji Taghay (son of Sutay), with his sons and brothers, joined Shaikh Hasan along with Hajji Tughnak and Shaikh Muhammad Maulayad (governor of Khorasan). Initially, Shaikh Hasan sought a negotiated settlement and sent his atabeg, Tashtimur Aqa, to mediate. However, Tashtimur was arrested upon arrival at 'Ali Padshah's camp, and a secret message was sent back indicating the agreement was void. Realising the breach, Shaikh Hasan proclaimed a new Ilkhan, a child named Pir Husayn from Möngke Temür's lineage, under the regnal name Muhammad Khan, on 20 July 1336.

== Deployment and combat ==
Ali Padshah's army marched from Tabriz to the vicinity of Van. The battle lines were drawn near Qara Dara (Turkish: Kara Dere, nowadays known as Zilan deresi, near modern Erciş). Shaikh Hasan commanded the centre, with Hajji Taghay on the right and Surghan (son of Chupan) on the left. Additionally, Shaikh Hasan's vanguard was commanded by Georgian contingent led by Botso Tsmedisdze, feudal lord from Tao province sent by Amirgambar I Panaskerteli. On the opposing side, Musa Khan and his brother Muhammad Beg held the centre, 'Ali Padshah commanded their right, while Uyghur emir Ögrünch commanded their left. They were joined by emirs Artuqshah (son of Alqu), Maḥmūd ibn Isan Qutlugh (governor of Hamadan) and Sultanšāh Nikruz.

The battle began with early successes for 'Ali Padshah’s side: he defeated Hajji Taghay, and Ögrünch overcame Surghan. However, the tide turned when Shaikh Hasan, supported by his son Ilkan, emir Qara Hasan, and Shaikh Muhammad Maulayad, led a decisive charge that routed Musa Khan and broke 'Ali Padshah’s centre. While Hajji Taghay returned with a few followers and Surghan regrouped, Ögrünch was eventually defeated. The pursuing forces of Botso Tsmedisdze captured 'Ali Padshah and brought him before Shaikh Hasan, who had taken position on a nearby hill. There, 'Ali Padshah was executed. In contrast, Hafiz-i Abru and Sharaf Khan Bidlisi provide differing accounts, suggesting that 'Ali Padishah was killed in the field by arrows and daggers without being taken captive.

== Aftermath ==
Following the decisive defeat at Qara Dara and the execution of Ali Padshah, Hasan Buzurg installed his puppet, the child Muhammad Khan, on the Ilkhanid throne in Tabriz on 25 July 1336, coinciding with Eid al-Adha. Yarlighs were sent across the realm announcing the victory, and local populations began to acknowledge Muhammad Khan’s nominal authority. However, real power rested with Shaikh Hasan, who now governed as the effective ruler of the Ilkhanate. Despite the victory, opposition did not fully subside. Musa Khan fled the scene and elements of the defeated coalition regrouped. A significant number of Oirat forces, led by Ali Padshah’s brothers and supported by Maḥmūd ibn Isan Qutlugh, continued to resist. In early 1337, they aligned with Togha Temür, a descendant of Jochi Qasar (Genghis Khan’s brother), who was proclaimed Ilkhan in Khorasan. However, Oirats never recovered after this point and faded from Iranian politics.

Nonetheless, Qara Dara marked the definitive collapse of ʿAlī Padshāh’s faction and consolidated Shaikh Hasan’s ascendancy. The battle also elevated key allies, such as the Georgian feudal lord Botso Tsmedisdze, whose capture of Ali Padshah was commemorated in Georgian ecclesiastical sources. Though nominal authority rested with Muhammad Khan, the Ilkhanate’s political centre had effectively shifted to the emergent Jalayirid regime led by Shaikh Hasan Buzurg.

== Sources ==
- van Loon, Johannes Baptist (1954), Tarikh-i Shaikh Uways, The Hague: Mouton & Co., OCLC 468650590
