= Muhammad Khan (Ilkhan) =

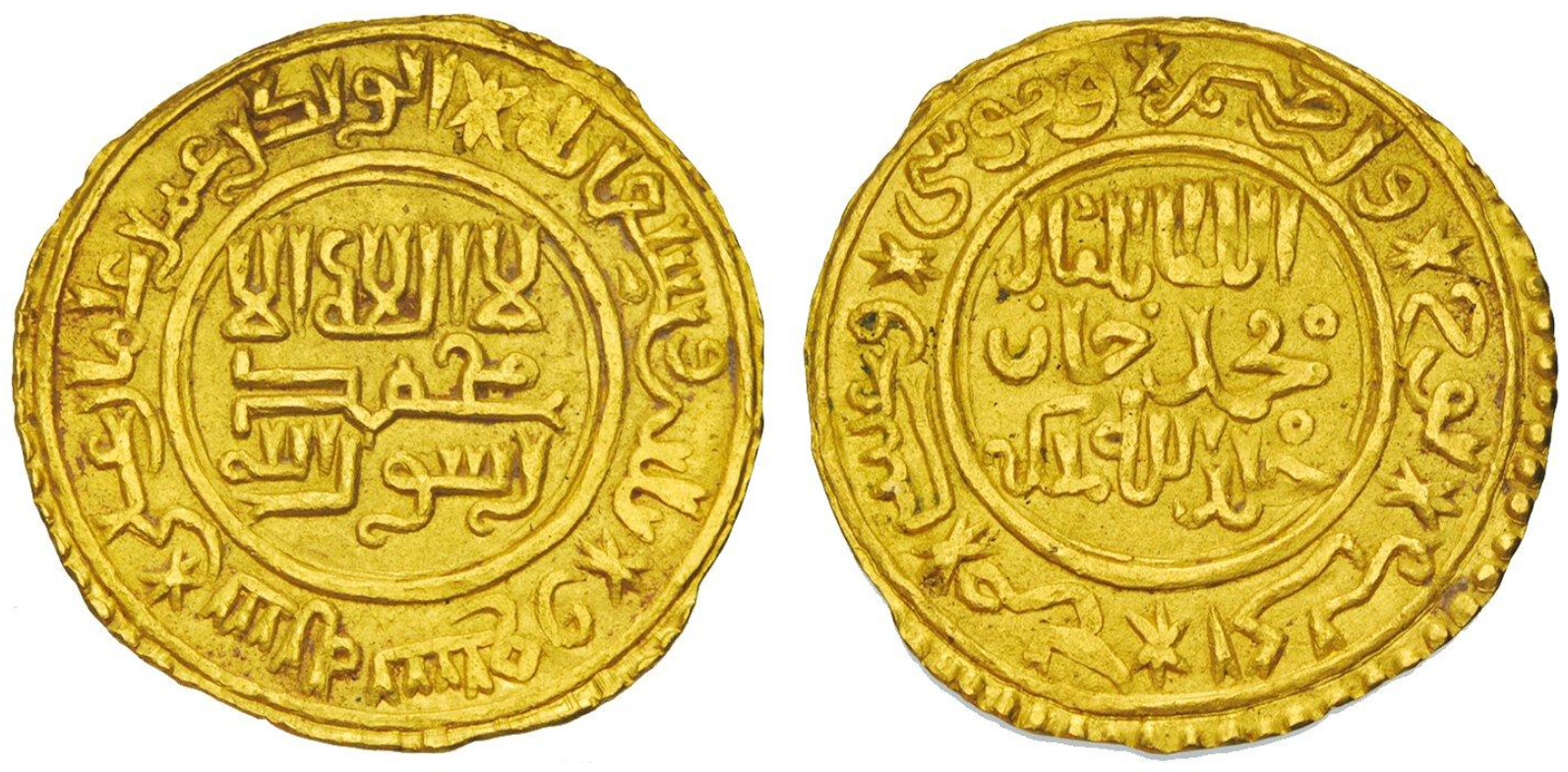
- Ilkhanids, Muhammad Khan (1337-1338) Dinar, Al-Jazira mint, Dated AH 737 (1336-1337)

Il-Khan
- Reign: 20 July 1336 – 16 July 1338
- Coronation: 25 July 1336
- Predecessor: Musa
- Successor: Jahan Temür (Jalayirid puppet); Sati Beg (Chupanid puppet)
- Vizier: Jalal ad-Din Zakariyya; Masudshah Inju
- Born: Pir Husayn
- Died: 16 July 1338
Regnal name
- Pir Muhammad
- House: Borjigin
- Father: Yul Qutlugh
- Religion: Sunni Islam

Muhammad Khan (died July 1338) was a claimant to the throne of the Ilkhanate from 1336 to 1338.

== Ancestry ==
He was born Pir Husein, a great-grandson of Möngke Temür, a son of Hulagu. His ancestry is cited differently in certain sources - in one source he is shown as a son of Yul Qutlugh b. El-Temür b. Anbarchi b. Mengu Timur and in Mirkhwand he is mentioned as a son of Qutlugh b. Amir Timur b. Anbarchi b. Mengu Timur.

== Reign ==
Hussein was still a child when he was raised to the throne by Jalayirid Hasan Buzurg and given the regnal name Muhammad Khan. This was done in opposition to his third cousin once removed, Musa. In Battle of Qara Darra that took place on July 24, 1336, Hasan Buzurg and Muhammad Khan defeated the forces of 'Ali Padshah and his puppet, Ilkhan Musa. Hasan Buzurg then installed his claimant in Tabriz. Jalal ad-Din Zakariyya (or Shams al-Din) and late Mahmudshah Inju's son Masudshah were appointed as his viziers while Hasan's supporters reaffirmed their positions. Chupanid Sorgan and his mother Sati Beg gained Karabakh, Hajji Taghay reaffirmed in Diyarbakir, Hajji Tughanak acquired Baghdad, Musa's would be killer, Emir Qara Hasan granted overlordship over Oirat tribes. However Qara Hasan and Hajji Tughanak couldn't manage to subjugate them and were utterly defeated, latter being killed. Remaining Oirats regrouped under Governor of Khorasan, Shaikh Ali (son of Emir Ali Quschi) and supported Togha Temür for Ilkhanid throne. They were further aided by Ögrünch and Mahmud Esen Qutlugh and even occupied Soltaniyeh for a while. However they were eventually defeated by Jalayirid army, Ali Padshah's brother Muhammed Beg and his wife Qutlugh Malik Khatun (daughter of Gaykhatu) were killed by Kurdish tribesmen, while Oirat leader Shaikh Ali was executed by Arghunshah (son of Emir Nawruz), who wanted Togha Temür to be his own puppet. Ögrünch and Mahmud Esen Qutlugh were too eliminated.

Over the next few years, Hasan Buzurg and Muhammad strengthened their hold over western Persia, but the appearance of the Chupanid Hasan Kucek interrupted their plans. Hasan Kucek claimed a Turkish slave of his father's deputy was in fact, his father Timurtash and arrived from Egypt. This news caused Chupanids to split off from Jalayirids and join Hasan Kucek. The two opposing sides then met in the Ala Tagh area near Van on July 16, 1338, with both Hasan Buzurg and Muhammad Khan suffering defeat. After Hasan Buzurg fled, Muhammad Khan was captured by the Chupanids and executed.

Preceded by Musa	Ilkhan (Jalayirid candidate); 1336–1338	Succeeded by Jahan Temür
