= Kutlushah =

Mongol general

Qutlughshah

Supreme Commander of Ilkhanate
- In office 1297–1307
- Appointed by: Ghazan
- Preceded by: Nawruz
- Succeeded by: Chupan

Personal details
- Born: c. 1250
- Died: June 13, 1307 (aged 56–57) Gilan

Military service
- Battles/wars: Battle of Wadi al-Khaznadar; Battle of Marj al-Saffar (1303)

Kutlushah, Kutlusha or Qutlughshah (Mongolian: Кутлугшах, Persian: قتلغشاه, Armenian: Խութլուշահ or Cotlesse in Frank sources), was a general under the Mongol Ilkhanate ruler Ghazan at the end the 13th century. He was particularly active in the Christian country of Georgia and especially during the Mongol invasion of Syria, until his ignominious defeat in 1303 led to his banishment. He was killed during the conquest of Gilan in 1307.

== Early life ==
Kutlushah was a member of the Mongol Manghud tribe. His father Mangghudai Noyan was one of leading generals of Kublai, whose grandfather Jedei Noyan was Genghis Khan's mingghan commander. His uncle Hulqutu Qurchi was also a major keshig emir of Hulagu and Abaqa. He had two or three brothers who had died before his rise to prominence. Amir Timur Buqa was one of his brothers who commanded a mingghan.

== Nawruz's rebellion ==
He served Abaqa as his commander and became a companion of then prince Ghazan in Khorasan when the prince was still a teenager after Nawruz's rebellion. However, he couldn't engage in military matters due to his illness in the winter of 1289, but joined Ghazan's expedition against Nawruz in the spring. Joined by Nurin Aqa and Amir Sutai, he resisted Nawruz rather unsuccessfully. Ghazan sent Qutlughshah to the newly enthroned Gaykhatu to inform him of developments in Khorasan in 1291, however Gaykhatu was little interested in sending reinforcements apart from several emirs. Seeing this, Ghazan appointed Kutlushah as his deputy in Khorasan and proceeded to Azerbaijan to meet Gaykhatu in person, but ilkhan repeatedly denied to see him. Kutlushah, meanwhile managed to overwhelm Nawruz and forced him to retire to Nishapur. After a while Kutlushah was reported to be suffering from drinking alcohol heavily, after being treated, he stopped drinking. He was present with Ghazan when Nawruz resubmitted to him November 1294.

== Under Ghazan ==
After Gaykhatu's murder and Baydu's enthronement, Ghazan marched against new ilkhan in 1295, accusing him of unjust murder of his uncle. Kutlushah commanded left wing of Ghazan's army and defeated Baydu, finally capturing him in Nakhchivan. After Ghazan's enthronement, he was given hand of Arghun's daughter Öljai Timur Khatun on 30 May 1296. He grew closer to Ghazan and asked for investigation on Nawruz, suspecting of his treason.

=== Anatolian campaigns ===
A series of revolts were erupted in Anatolia after Taghachar's execution in 1296. First one was by Baltu (from Jalair tribe), who captured Taghachar and turned him over to Ghazan. Ghazan appointed Kutlushah to lead three tumens towards Anatolia to crush him. After Baltu's defeat and subsequent flight, his accomplice Mesud II surrendered himself to Kutlushah. After receiving his submission, Kutlushah left for Herat to crush Nawruz in 1297 and executed him, meanwhile a new insurrection occurred by Kutlushah's subordinate, Sulamish in 1298. Kutlushah was forced to come back from Arran and won a victory against him, on 27 April 1299 near Erzinjan, causing Sulamish to flee to Mamluk Egypt.

=== Georgian campaigns ===
Kutlushah had an important role in the Kingdom of Georgia, where he owned lands, and his family was well known. He was often used as an intermediary and ambassador to negotiate with King David VIII who consistently opposed Mongol rule.

When David VIII required reassurances from the Mongols, in the shape of promises and hostages, Kutlushah provided his own son Shiba'uchi together with the sons of other Mongol princes, and brought the Ghazan's ring. These reassurances help establish more confident relations between the Georgians and the Mongols, as the Georgians were key in maintaining the northern defenses of the Il-Khan realm against the Golden Horde. In 1298 and 1300, Kutlushah led the repression against popular revolts in the lands of David VIII.

He was involved in an incident, where Ghazan's vizier Sadr al-Din Zanjani incited him to act against Rashid-al-Din. However, after Qutlughshah's report, Zanjani was arrested and executed by Qutluqshah himself on 30 April 1298 with this brother Qutb al-Din by cutting him in half.

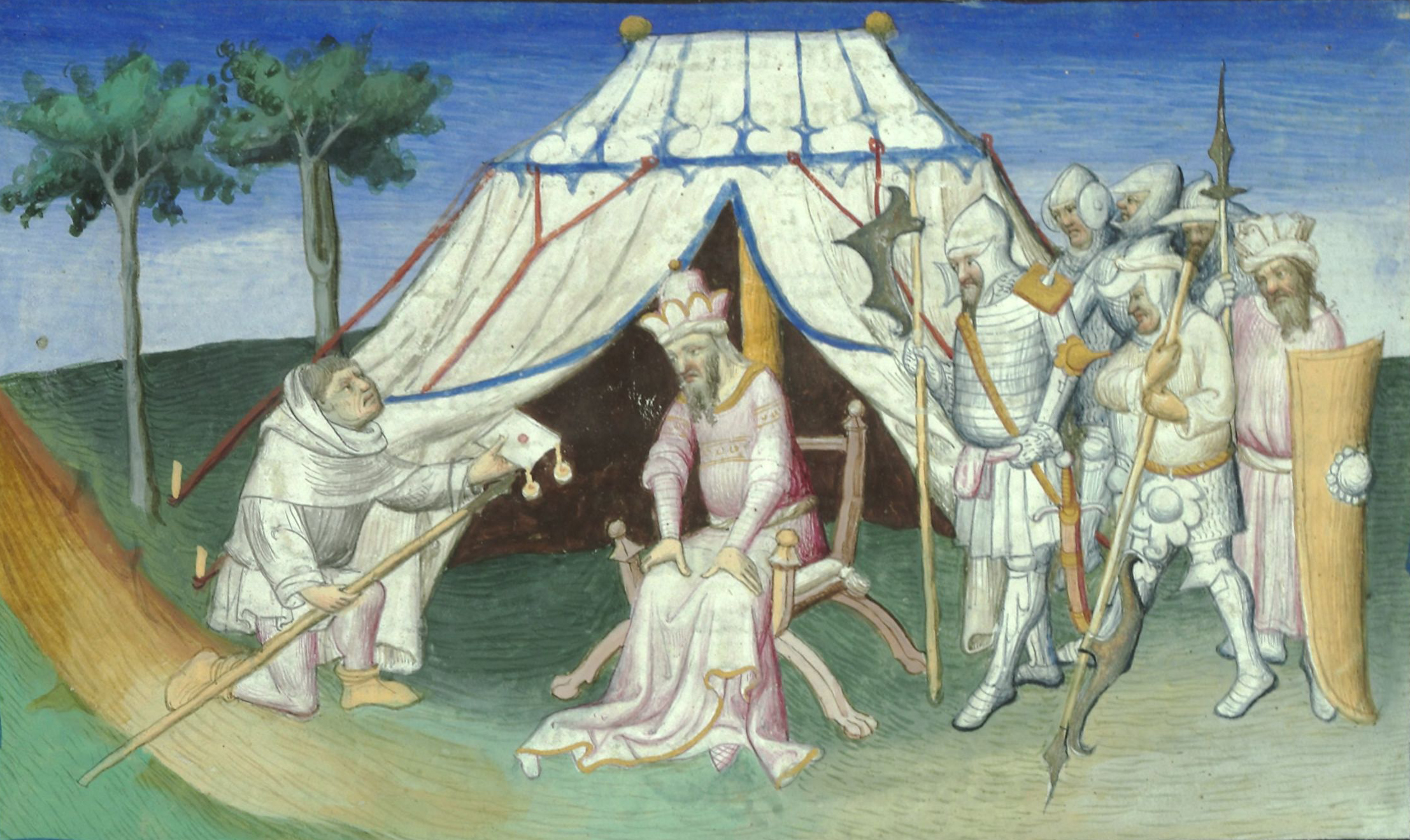
Ghazan ordering Hethum II, King of Armenia, to accompany Kutlushah on the 1303 attack on Damascus.

=== Syrian campaigns ===
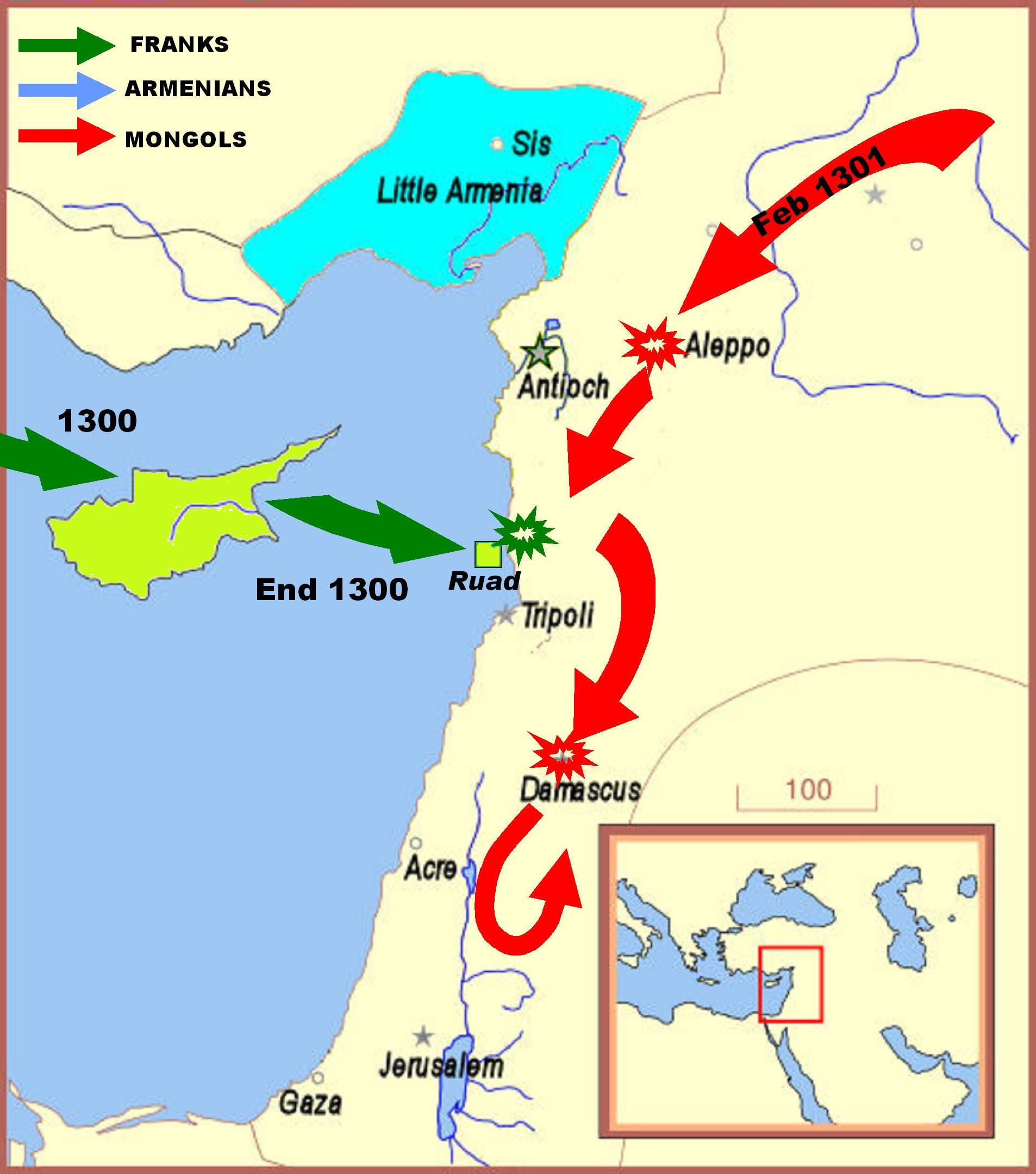
Mongol offensive led by Kutlushah

In 1300 Ghazan had promised a major invasion of Syria. However, he ended up sending a smaller force in February 1301, under Kutlushah. The force of approximately 60,000, did little else than engage in some raids around Syria. Kutlushah stationed 20,000 horsemen in the Jordan valley to protect Damas, where a Mongol governor was stationed. Soon however, they had to withdraw. According to the medieval historian Templar of Tyre:

"That year [1300], a message came to Cyprus from Ghazan, king of the Tatars, saying that he would come during the winter, and that he wished that the Franks join him in Armenia (...) Amalric of Lusignan, Constable of the Kingdom of Jerusalem, arrived in November (...) and brought with him 300 knights, and as many or more of the Templars and Hospitallers (...) In February a great admiral of the Tatars, named Cotlesser ([Kutlushah]), came to Antioch with 60,000 horsemen, and requested the visit of the king of Armenia, who came with Guy of Ibelin, Count of Jaffa, and John, lord of Giblet. And when they arrived, Cotlesse told them that Ghazan had met great trouble of wind and cold on his way. Cotlesse raided the land from Haleppo to La Chemelle, and returned to his country without doing more."

— Le Templier de Tyre, Chap 620-622

Kutlushah was given another princess of royal house on 7 August 1301, this time El Qutlugh Khatun, daughter of Gaykhatu, following death of Öljai Timur.

Kutlushah also led the 1303 Mongol offensive into Syria, with a strong force of about 80,000, plus troops from the Armenians. However Kutlushah, along with another Mongol general Mulay, were defeated with the Armenians at Homs on March 30, 1303, and at the decisive Battle of Shaqhab, south of Damas, on April 21, 1303. Their invasion, decisively repelled by the Egyptian Mamluks, is considered to be the last major Mongol invasion of Syria. According to the Mamluk historian Al-Maqrizi, Kutlushah barely escaped the death penalty for his defeat. Instead, he received the humiliation of being spat upon by all the people present at his judgement, and his generals all received baton strokes as a punishment. Kutlushah was then exiled to the region of Gilan.

== Under Öljaitü ==
Upon Ghazan's death in 1304, his brother Öljaitü was raised to the throne. Subsequently, Kutlushah was restored to favor and was named supreme commander of Ilkhanate forces. His son Qaranjuq was appointed to serve in Anatolia as Öljaitü's 20th emir in rank. He led Öljaitü's campaign in Gilan, starting from 1306. Departing from Khalkhal, he succeeded subduing Fuman and Gaskareh whose ruled Dabbaj sent presents to Kutlushah's subordinate Amir Pulad Qiya. However, his son Shiba'uchi convinced Kutlushah to push further and plunder Dabbaj's lands. Acting on his wishes, much of Fuman was plundered and Dabbaj's family arrested. Pulad Qiya was taken out of expedition and was replaced by Shiba'uchi, who was defeated during resistance from local armies from Tulim, Rasht and Shaft. Qutluqshah was ambushed by Rikabzen, ruler of Tulim on 13 June 1307 and killed. Several other versions of his death, including his execution on avenge of Nawruz, exist. The Mamluk historian Al-Yunini gave his death date as late as 3 July 1307. His body was taken to Tabriz and buried there. His subordinate Chupan was raised as new supreme commander of Ilkhanate after his death.

== Personality ==
According to al-Yunini, met Ibn Taymiyyah on 18 February 1300 and had a conversation on nature of Islam. According to Taymiyyah, Kutlushah was in 50s and had a yellowish skin color with beardless face.

Kutlushah converted to Islam alongside Ghazan in 1295. According to an anecdote, before his execution, Gilak ruler Rikabzen told him "Wasn't it him who delivered you from wearing chokha, drinking kumis and ayran and working in hard jobs to robe of honor, tasbih and fur-coat, fed you sweets and sugar, made you amir ulus of the country of Iran?", posing as Nawruz's avenger. He was described by reliable sources as a vehement supporter of Yassa and a critic of Islam. In one occasion, he supported a rival shaykh of Zahed Gilani, who unlike Allah-fearing Gilani, was afraid of Ghazan.

He criticized Islam again in 1307, during the reign of Öljaitü:

What is this that we have done, abandoning the new Yassa and yosun of Genghis Khan, and taking up the ancient religion of the Arabs, which is divided into seventy-odd parts? The choice of either of these two rites would be a disgrace and a dishonourable act, since in the one, marriage with a daughter is permitted and in the other, relations with one's mother or sister. We seek refuge in God from both of them! Let us return to the Yasa and yosun of Genghis Khan!

He was described as "friend to Christians" by Stephen Orbelian in History of the Province of Syunik. Several people in Armenian history, including Gregory of Tatev (his secular name was Kutlushah) and Prince Khutlushah of Erzincan (d. 1386) also bore his name.

== Family ==
He had numerous wives including two Ilkhanid princesses:

- Öljai Timur Khatun (married on 30 May 1296) — daughter of Arghun
- El Qutlugh Khatun (married on 7 August 1301) — daughter of Gaykhatu,

With other wives:

- Shiba'uchi — emir, later stripped of his titles by Öljaitü for causing his father's death
- Iqbalshah — Granted his possession in Georgia by Abu Sa'id
- Qaranjuq — Öljaitü's 20th emir in rank, stationed in Anatolia
- Sevinch Qutluq — married to Amir Sevinch on 15 February 1311
- A daughter — married to Emir Horqudaq
