= Jahan Temür =

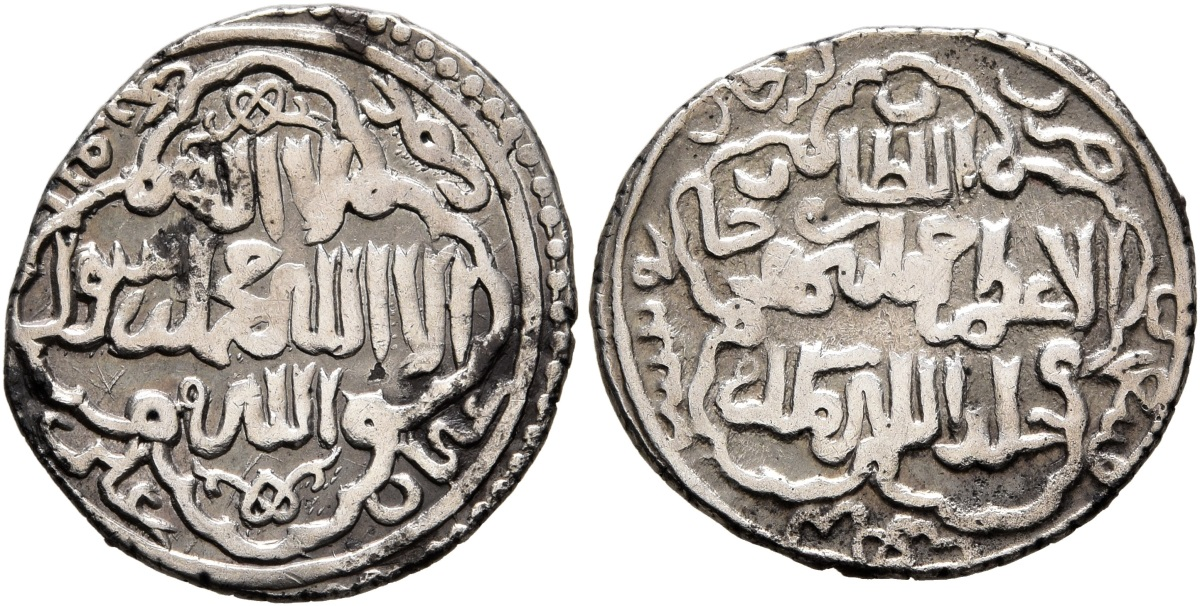
- Silver dirham of Jahan Temür

Il-Khan Jalayirid puppet
- Reign: Summer 1339 – 21 June 1340
- Predecessor: Muhammad
- Successor: Jalayirids became independent
- Vizier: Shams ad-Din Zakariyya
- House: Borjigin
- Father: Alafrang

Jahan Temür was a Jalayirid puppet for the throne of the Ilkhanate from 1339 to 1340.

== Life ==
He was son of Alafrang and the grandson of Gaykhatu and Jalayirid Dondi Khatun. His family had fallen out favor after Ghazan's ascension to the throne. His brother-in-law Eljigidei was executed by Ghazan in 1295, his father Alafrang was murdered on 30 May 1304 during the reign of Öljaitü. He must have been an elderly person when Jalayirid Hasan Buzurg raised him to the throne in 1339 near Hamadan. His rule was acknowledged from Basra to Samsun.

Hasan Buzurg and Jahan Temür Khan met the Chobanids under Hasan Kucek in battle on 21 June 1340 near the Jaghatu plains; the Jalayirids were defeated. Following this, Hasan Buzurg returned to Baghdad and deposed Jahan Temür. While Hasan Buzurg would recognize Togha Temur as his suzerain again for a time, Jahan Temür was his last puppet Ilkhan, and the Jalayirid (Ilkhan) dynasty of Baghdad came to rule in its own right. The fate of Jahan Temür himself is not recorded.

Preceded by Muhammad Khan	Ilkhan (Jalayirid candidate); 1339–1340	Succeeded by Jalayirids became independent
