= Musa (Ilkhanid dynasty) =

Il-Khan in 1336

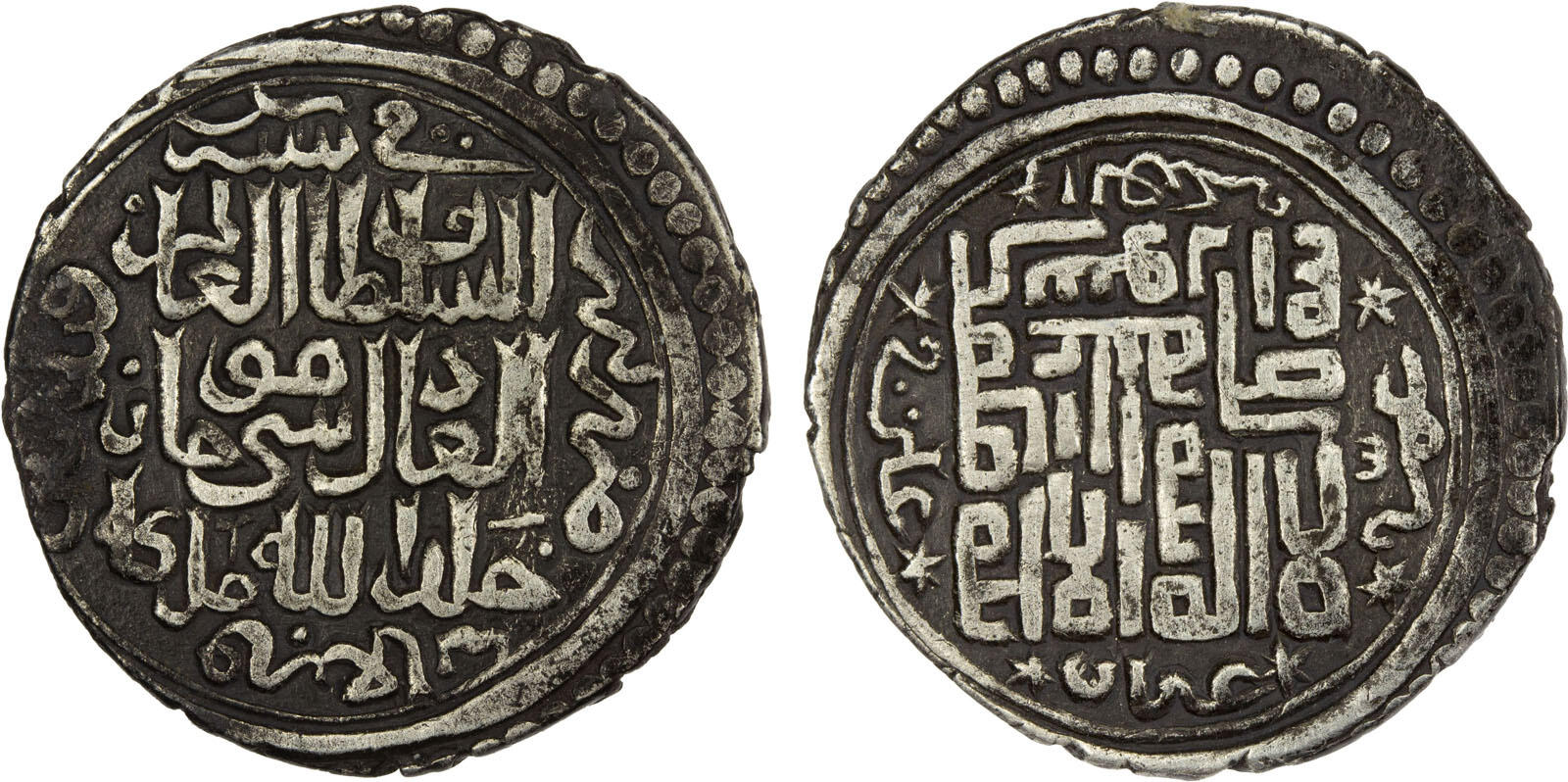
- Musa Khan 2 Dirhams coin; Tabriz mint

Il-Khan
- Reign: 29 April 1336 – 24 July 1336
- Predecessor: Arpa Ke'un
- Successor: Muhammad Khan
- Vizier: Jamal ad-Din Hajji
- Died: 10 July 1337
- House: Borjigin
- Father: Ali (son of Baydu)

Musa Khan (Persian: موسى خان) was an Ilkhan for 4 months.

== Reign ==
He was a grandson of Baydu. After securing Shaykh Hasan's neutrality, Musa's patron Ali Padshah went on to fight Arpa Ke'un on Jaghatu plains near Maragha culminating in the Battle of Jaghatu on 29 April 1336. Arpa's army were led by 60 umara, notably Hajji Taghay (son of Sutai, Governor of Diyarbakir, from Oirats), Uyghur commander Ögrünch, Torut (a son of Nari and relative of Narin Taghay), Ortuq-Shah (son of Alghu) and Chupan's son Sorgan Sira. However, soon some umara, such as Mahmud b. Essen Qutlugh and Sultanshah Nikruz, defected to the side of Ali Padshah. Battle was a defeat for Arpa and soon after he was captured in Sultaniya and killed.

Subsequently, Musa was enthroned as the new Ilkhan, in fact as a puppet of Ali Padshah. Supporters of Arpa Ke'un, namely Hajji Taghai meanwhile went to Jalayirid Hasan Buzurg, who in turn raised another Borjigid prince, Pir Husain as an Ilkhan on 20 July 1336. Chupanid Sorgan Sira again changed sides and joined Jalayirids at the battle of Qara Darra near Van. A Georgian contingent under Amirgambar I Panaskerteli, Duke of Tao also joined the battle on the Jalayirid side. Despite Ali Padshah's contingents defeating Hajji Taghay and Ögrünch defeating Surghan, Musa was standing on center and badly defeated. As a consequence, battle was lost and Ali Padshah captured and executed while Musa was forced to flee on July 24, 1336.

Despite losing his patron, Musa did not relinquish his claim to Ilkhanate and retreated to Baghdad, later joining forces with Togha Temür in June 1337 and occupying Soltaniyeh. However, he was soon captured by Emir Qara Hasan and killed on 10 July 1337.

Preceded by Arpa Ke'un	Ilkhan Emperor; 1336-1337	Succeeded by Muhammed Khan
