= Jagoldai =

Tatar principality in the Grand Duchy of Lithuania (15th–16th century)

Coordinates: 51°18′N 37°50′E

Jagoldai Җагалдай (Tatar) Яголдаева тьма (Russian) Jahołdajewszczyzna (Polish)
- c. 1438–c. 1500
- Map showing Tatar principalities in the 15th century, including Jagoldai
- Status: Vassal state
- Capital: Unknown (possibly near Stary Oskol)
- Common languages: Tatar, Ruthenian
- Religion: Islam, later Eastern Orthodoxy
- Government: Tumen (principality)
- Prince
  - c. 1438 – ?: Jagoldai Sarayevich
  - ? – c. 1493: Roman Jagoldaevich
- Historical era: Medieval
  - Founded by Golden Horde Tatars: c. 1438
  - Absorbed into Lithuania / transferred to Moscow: c. 1500
Preceded by	Succeeded by
Golden Horde	Grand Duchy of Lithuania; Grand Duchy of Moscow
- Today part of: Russia; Ukraine

Jagoldai (Tatar: Җагалдай, Cağolday, Cağalday; Polish: Jaholdaj, Jahołdajewszczyzna; Russian: Яголдаева тьма, Yagoldayeva t'ma; pronunciation: jaɣolˈdaj or dʒaɣalˈdaj) was a small Tatar tumen in what is now Kursk Oblast and Belgorod Oblast of Russia, as well as parts of Sloboda Ukraine. It existed as a vassal state of the Grand Duchy of Lithuania during the 15th and early 16th centuries.

The principality was founded between 1428 and 1438 by Tatars who had defected from the Golden Horde during a period of internal strife and plague. Here, the Russian designation t'ma (тьма, which usually means "darkness") derives from the tumen, a Mongol-Tatar administrative unit theoretically representing 10,000 households or soldiers.

== History ==
=== Foundation ===
The period between 1428 and 1430 was marked by severe instability in the Golden Horde. According to the Nikon Chronicle, there was "strife and great turmoil" (Бысть брань и замятия вели) among the Tatars, accompanied by an epidemic of plague that killed large numbers of people. This chaos prompted many Tatars to seek refuge in neighbouring territories.

Jagoldai, the principality's founder and namesake, was the son of Saray, an emir who served the powerful beklarbek Edigu and participated in the 1408 campaign against Moscow. A yarlig (decree) from the Crimean Khan Meñli I Giray later referred to the territory as "the tumen of Jagoldai, son of Saray" (Сараева сына Егалтаеву тму), confirming the transmission of the territory to the Grand Duke of Lithuania.

=== Lithuanian vassalage ===
Jagoldai became a vassal territory of the Grand Duchy of Lithuania, serving as a buffer zone between Lithuania and the remnants of the Golden Horde. The principality may have functioned as a military-administrative unit within the larger Principality of Mansura, another Tatar vassal state ruled by descendants of the Golden Horde commander Mamai through the Glinski family.

The Polish historian Stefan Kuczyński, who wrote one of the most detailed studies of Jagoldai, localised the principality to the upper reaches of the Oskol River, connecting it with a settlement called "Jagoldai gorodishche" (Jagoldai fortified town) that existed in the 17th century.

=== Decline and absorption ===
In the second half of the 15th century, the principality was ruled by Roman Jagoldaevich, who was either the son or great-grandson of the founder Jagoldai Sarayevich. Roman's daughter married Prince Yuri Borisovich Vyazemsky. Around 1494, Prince Vyazemsky and his wife fled to Moscow, and Jagoldai briefly became part of the domain lands of the Lithuanian Grand Duke Alexander Jagiellon.

According to a privilege dated 19 March 1497, the territory was divided among four Kiev boyars: Debr Kalenikovych, Mikhail Gagin, Fedko Golenchich, and Kuntsa Senkovich. By the late 15th and early 16th centuries, the territory passed to Moscow as a consequence of Prince Vyazemsky's change of allegiance from Polish-Lithuanian service to Muscovite service.

== Population and legacy ==
The Tatar settlers in Jagoldai gradually mixed with the local Slavic population and adopted Eastern Orthodox Christianity. This process of assimilation contributed to the formation of the Sevryuki, a local Cossack population group that emerged in the region.

A 1600 survey mentioned that in 1570, there were "Oskol Cossacks" (оскольские казаки) in the region. The 17th-century document known as the "Register of Polish Roads" (Росписи польским дорогам) described the route to "Jagoldai gorodishche" from Livny, indicating that the memory of the Tatar settlement persisted long after the principality's political dissolution.

Archaeological excavations in the Stary Oskol area have revealed traces that can be associated with the population of the Jagoldai tumen, though much about the principality's material culture remains unknown.

== See also ==
- Tumen (unit)
- Golden Horde
- Grand Duchy of Lithuania
- House of Glinski
- Lipka Tatars
- Principality of Mansura
- Turkic peoples
