= Battle of Marj al-Saffar (1303) =

Battle in the Mamluk-Ilkhanid War

Coordinates: 33°21′39″N 36°14′53″E

Battle of Marj al-Saffar (also called Battle of Shaqhab)
- Part of the Mongol invasions of the Levant
- The Battle of Marj al-Saffar in context of the Mongol offensives in the Levant, 1299–1300
Date	April 20–22, 1303
Location	Ghabaghib, 25 miles south of Damascus in Syria
Result	Mamluk-Tayy victory

Belligerents
Mamluk Sultanate Tayy tribe	Ilkhanate; Armenian Kingdom of Cilicia

Commanders and leaders
Sayf al-Din Salar; Baybars II; Al-Nasir Muhammad; Asandamur Kurji; Ibn al-Azkashi; Ibn Taymiyya	Qutlugh-Shah; Mulay; Hethum II of Armenia

Strength
18,000–20,000	20,000–30,000

Casualties and losses
1,000	Unknown

The Battle of Marj al-Saffar (or Marj al-Suffar), also known as the Battle of Shaqhab, took place on April 20 through April 22, 1303 between the Egyptian Mamluks and the Mongols and their Armenian allies near Kiswe, Syria, just south of Damascus. The battle has been influential in both Islamic history and contemporary time because of the controversial jihad against other Muslims and Ramadan related fatwas issued by Ibn Taymiyyah. The battle, a disastrous defeat for the Mongols, put an end to Mongol invasions of the Levant.

== Previous Mongol-Muslim conflict ==
A string of Mongol victories, starting in 1218 when they had invaded Khwarezm, quickly gave the Mongols control over most of Persia as well as the Abbasid Dynasty of Iraq and the Seljuk Sultanate of Rum of Asia Minor. Incorporating troops from vassal countries such as Cilician Armenia and the Kingdom of Georgia, the Mongols had sacked Baghdad in 1258, followed by the taking of Aleppo and Damascus in 1260. Later that same year, the Mongols had experienced their first major defeat at the Battle of Ain Jalut, which eventually forced the Mongols out of Damascus and Aleppo and back across the Euphrates. Nearly 40 years later, the Ilkhan Ghazan once again invaded Syria, retaking Aleppo in 1299. Ghazan defeated Mamluk forces at the Battle of Wadi al-Khazandar that same year, and Damascus quickly surrendered to him. After sending raiding parties as far south as Gaza, Ghazan withdrew from Syria.

== Events just before the battle ==
In 1303, Ghazan sent his general Qutlugh-Shah with an army to recapture Syria. The inhabitants and rulers of Aleppo and Hama fled to Damascus to escape the advancing Mongols. However, Baibars II was in Damascus and sent a message to the Sultan of Egypt, Al-Nasir Muhammad, to come to fight the Mongols. The Sultan left Egypt with an army to engage the Mongols in Syria, and arrived while the Mongols were attacking Hama. The Mongols had reached the outskirts of Damascus on April 19 to meet the Sultan's army. The Mamluks then made their way to the plain of Marj al-Saffar, where the battle would take place.

== Battle ==
The battle commenced on 2 Ramadhan 702 in the Hijri calendar, or April 20, 1303. Qutlugh-Shah's army was positioned near a river. Hostilities began when Qutlugh-Shah's left wing attacked the Mamluk right wing with his brigade of 10,000 soldiers. The Mamluks reportedly suffered heavy casualties. The Mamluk center and left wings under the command of the emirs Salar and Baibars al-Jashnakir, together with their Bedouin irregulars, then engaged the Mongols. The Mongols continued their pressure on the right flank of the Mamluk army. Many of the Mamluks believed that the battle would soon be lost. The Mamluk left flank, however, had remained steady.

Qutlugh-Shah then went to the top of a nearby hill, hoping to watch the victory of his forces. While he was issuing orders to his army, the Mamluks surrounded the hill. This led to heavy, bitter fighting, and the Mongols suffered many casualties on the hill. The next morning, the Mamluks deliberately opened their ranks to allow the Mongols to flee to the river Wadi Arram. When the Mongols arrived at the river, they were able to receive reinforcements. However, while the Mongols were taking on badly needed supplies of water for themselves and their horses, the Sultan was able to attack them from the rear. The subsequent fighting, which lasted until noon, was vicious. By the next day, the battle was over.

== Role of Asandamur Kurji ==
The battle is remembered in particular for the decisive role played by the Mamluk commander Asandamur Kurji. Modern scholarship highlights that the outcome of the battle was largely determined by his leadership and strategic skills. According to Amir Mazor, Asandamur quickly understood the Mongols' intention when they tried to distract the Mamluk army with a large amount of booty. He prevented his soldiers from being diverted into looting and reorganized the troops effectively.

Asandamur divided the army into four groups and personally led the first contingent in the thick of battle. While one group engaged the Mongols frontally, the remaining divisions were ordered to surround the enemy, which inflicted heavy losses on the Mongol side. Around 180 Mongols were captured, while Mamluk losses were comparatively smaller. Asandamur's tactical foresight and personal courage broke the Mongol resistance and secured a decisive Mamluk victory at Marj al-Saffar. Contemporary and modern accounts both emphasize him as one of the leading figures of the campaign, whose skills and strategy were central to the success of the Mamluk Sultanate.

== Role of Ibn Taymiyyah ==
During the campaign, Ibn Taymiyyah played a prominent role in boosting morale. According to Ibn Kathir, he participated in the night patrols on the Damascus ramparts, encouraged the population with Qur’anic verses on jihad, and accompanied volunteers leaving to fight the Ilkhanids. He issued a fatwa permitting the soldiers to break the Ramadan fast in order to give full strength to the battle effort. While some contemporary authors such as Ibn ʻAbd al-Hādī stressed his role as a provider of moral support on the battlefield, his student Al-Bazzār also portrayed him as having fought with sword in hand. Al-Bazzār uniquely claimed that Ibn Taymiyyah was physically involved in the battlefield, fighting face-to-face against the Mongols.

Modern reliable historians consider Ibn Taymiyyah's contribution to have been primarily religious and psychological encouragement rather than direct military command. While traditional narratives often portray him as directly confronting the Mongols in battle, many modern scholars argue that such accounts are exaggerated. They emphasize that he was more engaged in inspiring the troops, boosting morale, and giving spiritual legitimacy to the struggle, rather than fighting face-to-face with the Mongol armies on the battlefield. Ibn Taymiyyah also reinforced Islamic law in Damascus after the battle by breaking wine jars and reasserting the khutba in the name of the Mamluk sultan and the Abbasid caliph.

== Aftermath ==
According to the medieval Egyptian historian Al-Maqrizi, after the battle, Qutlugh-Shah reached the Ilkhan Ghazan at Kushuf, to inform him of the defeat of his forces. It was reported that Ghazan, upon hearing the news, had gone into such a rage that it resulted in a nose bleed. Messages were sent to Egypt and Damascus to tell of the victory, and the Sultan went to Damascus. While the Sultan was in Damascus, the Mamluk army kept chasing the Mongols as far as Al-Qaryatayn. When the Sultan returned to Cairo, he entered through the Bab al-Nasr (Victory Gate) with chained prisoners of war. Singers and dancers were called from all over Egypt to celebrate the great victory. Castles were decorated and the celebrations lasted many days.
