= Battle of Jaghatu =

- Part of the Disintegration of the Ilkhanate
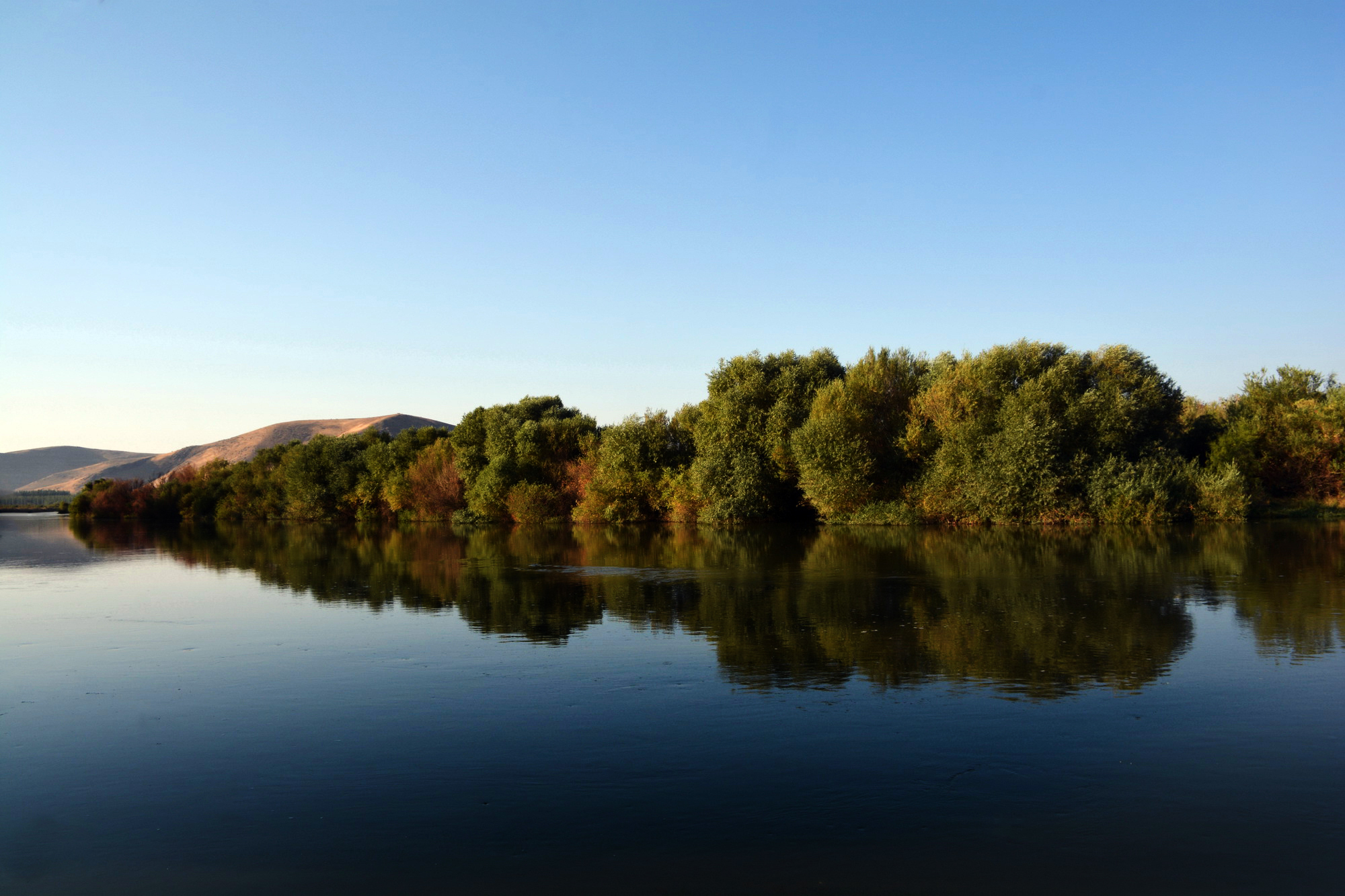
- Zarrineh River
Date	Spring 1336
Location	Jaghatu River, Ilkhanate (modern-day Iran)
Result	Victory for the Oirat faction: Musa Khan proclaimed as Ilkhan

Belligerents
Faction of Arpa Ke'un	Faction of Musa Khan; Oirat tribe

Commanders and leaders
Court faction: Arpa Ke'un (executed); Ghiyath al-Din Muhammad (executed)	Oirat faction: Musa Khan; Ali Padshah

Strength
Larger force	Smaller force

Casualties and losses
Heavy	Light

The Battle of Jaghatu was a fought between the faction of Arpa Ke'un and Ghiyath al-Din Muhammad on one side, Musa Khan and Ali Padshah on the other. The battle resulted in victory for Mūsá Khan and Ali Padshah. The former was proclaimed ruler of the declining Ilkhanate, while the latter emerged as its dominant figure.

== Background ==
Following the demise of Abu Sa'id Bahadur Khan in 1335, the Ilkhanate plunged into a period of political fragmentation and instability. With no male heir, several groups rose, each competing for ascendancy over Persia, a state ruled by the Mongols. Lacking a definite succession, violent clashes between Ilkhanid nobles, generals, and territorial governors ensued, and weakened the legitimacy of the central government even further.

One faction, under Ghiyath al-Din Muhammad, a vizier and a son of historian Rashid al-Din Hamadani, hoped to stabilize the Ilkhanate through enthronement of Arpa Khan, a descendant of Tolui. Arpa was installed with the backing of powerful personalities, including Abū Sa‘īd's mother and sister, Haji Khatun and Sati Beg, and argued that Chinggisid continuity in ruling was a necessity for peace in the empire.

Opposing this claim was Ali Padshah, governor of Baghdad and a maternal uncle of Abū Sa‘īd, openly questioned Arpa Khan's legitimacy and supported Mūsá Khan, a descendant of Baydu Khan, in its stead. In addition, Ali Padshah took charge of caring for Abū Sa‘īd's widow, Dilshad Khatun, who happened to be pregnant at that point, in hope that her unborn offspring could act as a direct heir to the Ilkhanate. However, as months passed without a universally recognized ruler, tensions escalated, leading to open conflict.

== Battle ==
In the spring of 1336, Arpa Khan and Ghiyath al-Din Muhammad's forces fought with Ali Padshah and Mūsá Khan's army near the Jaghatu River near Maragheh. Arpa Khan's army, comprising a mix of Mongol and Persian regiments, enjoyed numerical superiority over Ali Padshah's army. Nevertheless, factionalism in his army, in addition to changing allegiances amongst the nobility of the Ilkhanid, played a significant role in deciding the encounter's fate.

Map showing Marageh

The battle having begun, Ali Padshah's army, comprising a predominantly Oirat tribesmen and supporting groups, clashed with Arpa Khan's army in a violent encounter. In a disadvantageous position in terms of manpower, Ali Padshah took advantage of disaffection in Arpa Khan's army. Before actual fighting started, one of Arpa's senior generals, Amir Akrunj, initiated a surreptitious move by swearing an oath of fealty to Ali Padshah. In doing so, he guaranteed that most of his predominantly Uyghur contingent would switch allegiances at a critical stage in the battle. That defection weakened Arpa Khan's position in actual fighting, and in consequence, disarray ensued in his army.

By the end of the battle, Mūsá Khan and Ali Padshah emerged victorious. Ghiyath al-Din Muhammad and his brother, Pir Sultan, were captured and then executed by the successful amirs. Arpa Khan attempted to escape but nevertheless, in the end, he was captured and executed.

== Aftermath ==
After the defeat and execution of Arpa Khan, Mūsá Khan was declared Ilkhan but in fact, real power lay with Ali Padshah, who became the paramount political and martial presence in western Ilkhanate. In an attempt to consolidate his position, Ali Padshah attempted to rule through his Chinggisid protégé, meanwhile holding a strong grasp over administration and affairs of state in the empire.

Nine days after the battle, Dilshad Khatun, widow of Abū Sa‘īd, bore a daughter, putting an end to any hope for a direct male heir to inherit the throne of the Ilkhanid state. With no universally recognized Hülegüid heir to claim legitimacy, the legitimacy of Mūsá Khan continued to face challenge. Resistance to Ali Padshah's rule began to organize, most prominently represented in Shaikh Hasan Jalayir, a powerful amir who refused outright to admit any legitimacy in Mūsá Khan's claim to rule.

As tension mounted, Shaikh Hasan Jalayir rallied support in Anatolia and Arab Iraq, forming a rival power base in Baghdad. This led to further conflicts and power struggles within the Ilkhanate, contributing to the continued fragmentation of the state. Meanwhile, Ali Padshah's control over the Ilkhanate remained precarious, as various factions competed for influence, further destabilizing the region.
