= Mulay =

Mongolian commander

Viceroy of Diyar Bakr
- In office 1297–1312
- Appointed by: Ghazan
- Preceded by: Taghachar
- Succeeded by: Sutay

Personal details
- Died: 1312 Diyarbakir

Mulay, Mûlay, Bulay (Mongolian: Мулай or Molay for the Franks, fl. 1289 - 1312) was a general under the Mongol Ilkhanate ruler Ghazan at the end of the 13th century. Mulay was part of the 1299–1300 Mongol offensive in Syria and Palestine, and remained with a small force to occupy the land after the departure of Ghazan. He also participated in the last Mongol offensive in the Levant in 1303. His name has caused confusion for some historians, because of its similarity with that of the contemporary Grand Master of the Knights Templar, Jacques de Molay.

== Early years ==
According to Maitland Muller's translation of Jami' al-Tawarikh, he was a member of Küin clan of Tatar tribe. Michael Hope calls him a maternal uncle to Ghazan various times, while Rashid al-Din doesn't specify him as brother to Ghazan's mother Qultaq, but rather as a brother to certain Küräk Temür, whom Arghun took Qultaq from:

Arghun Khan requested Ghazan's mother, Qultaq, the daughter of Kihtar Bitigchi of the Dörbän tribe, at the age of twelve from Küräk Temür, the brother of Uruqtu and Mulai.

— Rashid al-Din Hamadani, Jami' al-tawarikh, Volume 3

In any case, he was close to Ghazan, by the virtue of his fiefs were located in Quhistan, which was located in Ghazan's viceroyalty of Khorasan. He was on side of Ghazan when Nawruz revolted in 1289. He captured Nawruz's puppet prince Hulachu on 30 April 1289 on behalf of Ghazan. He spent summer of 1290 repulsing attacks by Qaraunas under Danishmend Bahadur. Facing failure, he went back to Quhistan to reinforcements in 1291. Hearing death of Arghun in March, he rejoined Ghazan near Simnan, where he was given a sister of emir Satalmish, another emir under Ghazan. He was sent with Sutai against rebellious malik of Zozan and Mihrabanid prince Shah Ali who came to his aid in 1292. Siege was quick, Shah Ali was defeated and fled to Sistan with a thousand men.

After Ghazan's accession, he became member of kheshig and was sent to Khorasan to arrest Tughan, who was also from Quhistan. Later, he joined Nawruz in 1295 against Duwa. However, Ilkhanid prince Sogai (son of Yoshmut) refused to join campaign in Khorasan, believing this was Nawruz's plot further deprive nobility of their possessions. Nawruz informed Ghazan of this plot, subsequently executed him. It was Mulay who brought news to Ghazan in Arran. Emir Taghachar was also executed for involving in a conspiracy with Sogai and was replaced by Mulai in Diyar Bakr.

== As Viceroy of Diyar Bakr ==
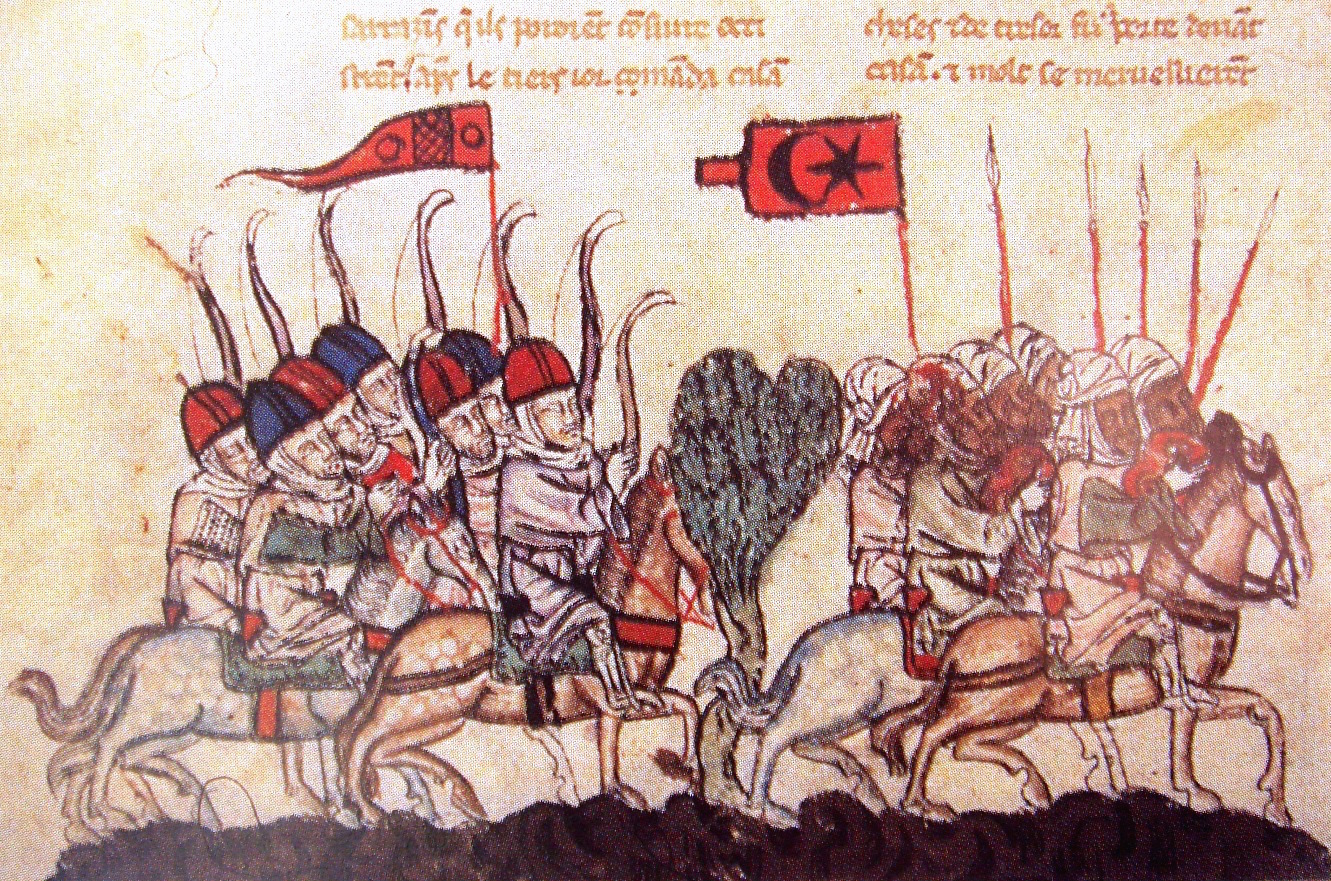
Depiction of the Battle of Homs in a manuscript of the History of the Tatars

His appointment in Mamluk border was not without incidents. In 1299, Ghazan marched with his generals Mulay and Samagar towards Egyptian Mamluk-controlled Syria. The Mongols successfully took the city of Aleppo, and then defeated the Mamluks in the Battle of Wadi al-Khazandar, on December 23 or 24, 1299. At some point, Ghazan ordered Mulay to lead a raid through Palestine, with a tumen, a force of 10,000–20,000 horsemen. Mulay's group split off from Ghazan's army, and pursued the retreating Mamluk troops as far as Gaza, pushing them back to Egypt. The bulk of Ghazan's forces then proceeded on to Damascus, which surrendered at some point between December 30, 1299, and January 6, 1300, though its Citadel resisted. Ghazan then retreated with most of his forces in February, probably because the Mongol horses needed fodder. He promised to return in November to attack Egypt. Mulay and his horsemen returned to Damascus around March 1300, and followed Ghazan back across the Euphrates. In May 1300, the Egyptian Mamluks returned from Egypt and reclaimed the entire area without a battle.

=== 1303 offensive ===
In 1303, the Mongols, led by Ghazan's generals Mulay and Qutlugh-Shah, reappeared in great strength in Syria (about 80,000) together with the Armenians. However, they were defeated at Homs on March 30, 1303, and also at the decisive Battle of Shaqhab, south of Damascus, on April 21, 1303. It is considered to be the last major Mongol invasion of Syria. Mulai was bastinadoed for his incompetence during the battles on the orders of Ghazan on 17 July 1303.

=== Last years ===
After death of Ghazan in 1304, he supported Öljaitü and advised him to keep Ghazan's death as a secret for smooth transition. He happens to have little to no activity in his last years as less authors mention him. He supported Öljaitü's decision in executing the Mongol general Bilarghu for treacherously killing the Armenian king Leo III and his uncle Hethum II at a banquet. He died in 1312 while he was stationed at Diyarbakir.

== Mulay/Molay controversy ==
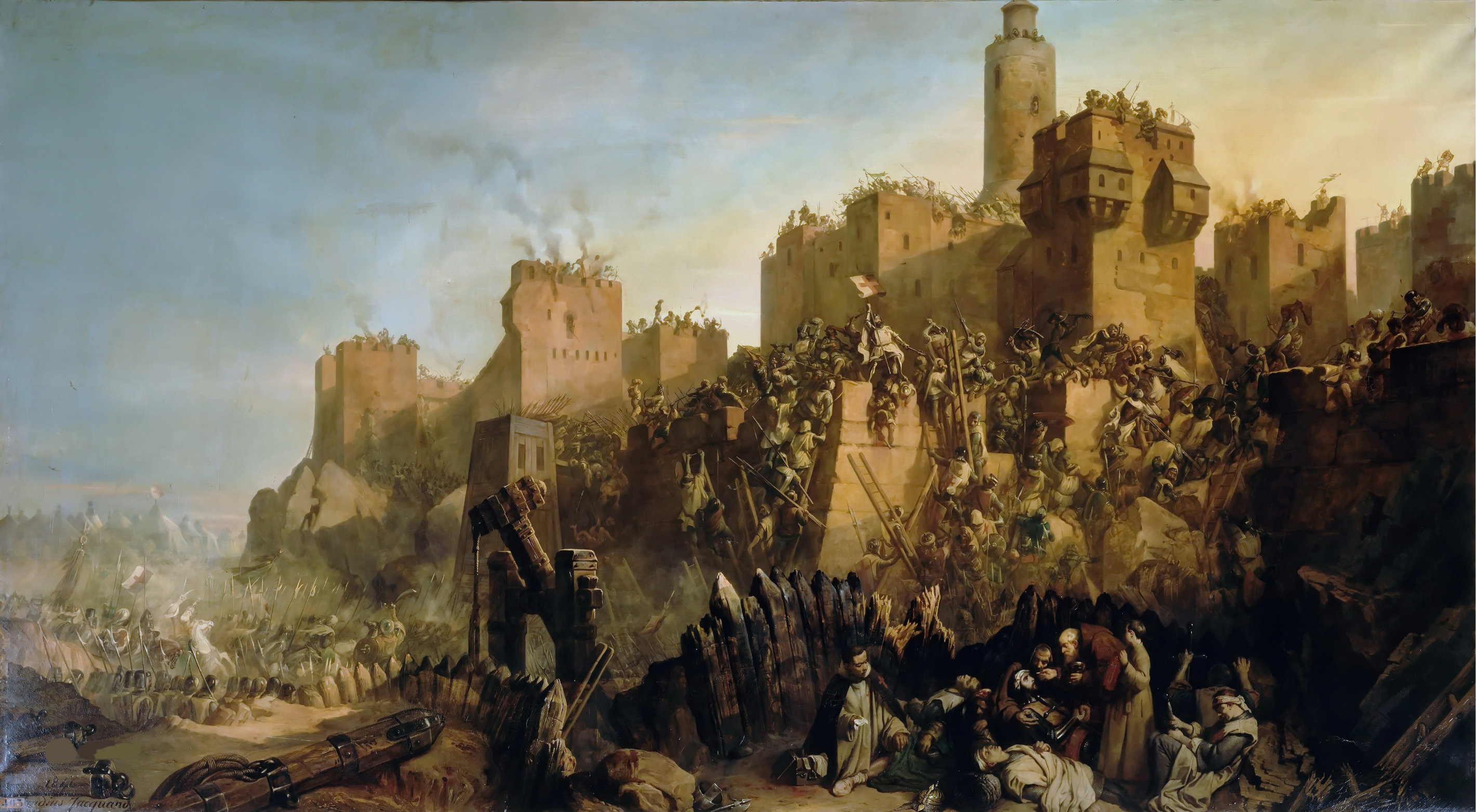
"Jacques Molay takes Jerusalem, 1299", a painting created in the 1800s by Claudius Jacquand, and hanging in the "Hall of Crusades" in Versailles. In reality, though the Mongols may have been technically in control of the city for a few months in early 1300 (since no other troops were in the area), De Molay was almost certainly on the island of Cyprus at that time, nowhere near the landlocked city of Jerusalem, and there is no record of any major battle for Jerusalem in 1299.

The 14th-century historian Templar of Tyre (assistant to the Knights Templar on Cyprus), wrote of the 1300 offensive:

"Ghazan, when he had vanquished the Sarazins returned in his country, and left in Damas one of his Emirs, who was named Molay, who had with him 10,000 Tatars and 4 generals."

— Le Templier de Tyr 611

The Molay mentioned by the Templar of Tyre has sometimes been confused with the contemporary Grand Master of the Knights Templar, Jacques de Molay (1244–1314). Some of this confusion was reinforced by the abundant rumors which had circulated in 1300, some of which had been placed in written form, that Jerusalem had been captured by the Mongols. The reports turned out to be false, the result of wishful thinking and poor communications between the continents. But the inadvertently false documents that resulted, when reviewed out of context, continued to fuel confusion (see Mongol raids into Palestine#European rumors about Jerusalem).

Modern historians agree that the Templar of Tyre's document does not designate Jacques de Molay, but instead designates the Mongol general "Mûlay". Earlier historians however, regularly confused the two. This confusion was further expanded in 1805, when the French playwright/historian, François Raynouard, made claims that Jerusalem had been captured by the Mongols, with Jacques de Molay in charge of one of the Mongol divisions. "In 1299, the Grand-Master was with his knights at the taking of Jerusalem." In 1846, a large-scale painting was created by Claude Jacquand, entitled Molay Prend Jerusalem, 1299 ("Molay Takes Jerusalem, 1299"), which depicts the supposed event. Today the painting hangs in the Hall of the Crusades in the French national museum in Versailles. And in the 1861 edition of the French encyclopedia, the Nouvelle Biographie Universelle, it says in the "Molay" article:

"Jacques de Molay was not inactive in this decision of the Great Khan. This is proven by the fact that Molay was in command of one of the wings of the Mongol army. With the troops under his control, he invaded Syria, participated in the first battle in which the Sultan was vanquished, pursued the routed Malik Nasir as far as the desert of Egypt: then, under the guidance of Kutluk, a Mongol general, he was able to take Jerusalem, among other cities, over the Muslims, and the Mongols entered to celebrate Easter"

— Nouvelle Biographie Universelle, "Molay" article, 1861.

Some modern writers, such as the contrarian historian Laurent Dailliez (Les Templiers), the novelist of popular pseudohistory Robert Payne (The Dream and the Tomb), and various Templar-related websites, still consider that the Templar of Tyre's Molay was Jacques de Molay himself, and attribute all of Mulay's deeds, as well as rumors of his deeds, to the Grand Master.

== Family ==
He was married to a sister of emir Satalmish. His descendants appear to have played role in further life of Ilkhanate, his son Abdullah inherited his fiefs in Quhistan and ruled it autonomously during reign of Chupanid puppet Sulaiman. Another son of Mulay — Rustam was described by Wassaf as an emir serving in Khorasan. Another possible descendant of his, Muhammad-i Mulai was sent by Hasan Buzurg to Khorasan to act as its governor but killed by Arghunshah, son of Nawruz. A descendant of Mulai through his Abdullah, Abu Sa'id Tabasi (Tabas is a city in historical Quhistan) was a favored person by Timur. Sultan Muhammad, the son of Abu Sa'id Tabasi was declared by sovereign of Yazd by rebels in 1395.
