= Arpa Ke'un =

Il-Khan from 1335 to 1336

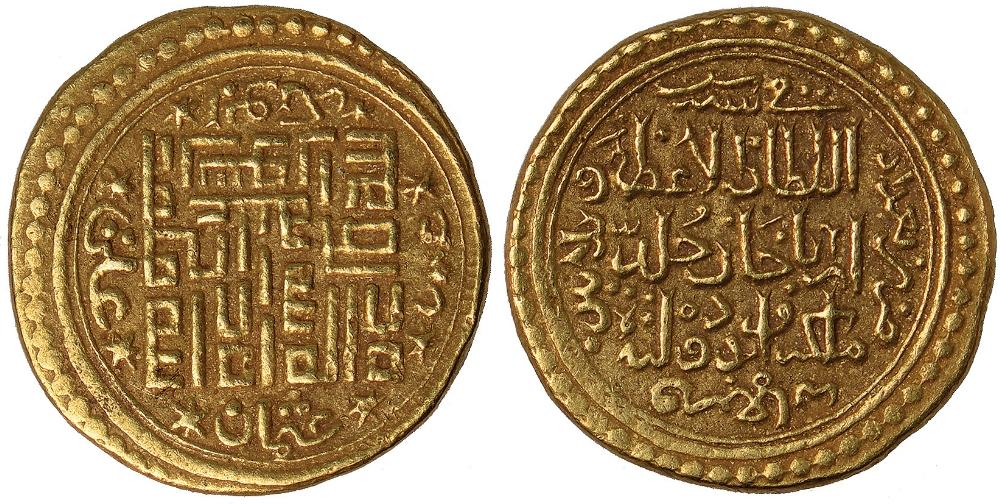

Il-Khan
- Reign: 1335–1336
- Coronation: 5 December 1335
- Predecessor: Abu Sa'id
- Successor: Musa
- Vizier: Ghiyas al-Din ibn Rashid al-Din
- Died: 15 May 1336
- Spouse: Sati Beg
Regnal name
- Sultan Muiz al-Dunya wa'l-Din Mahmud Arpa Ke'un
- House: Borjigin
- Father: Söse

Arpa Ke'un, also known as Arpa Khan or Gavon or Gawon (Persian: ارپا كاون; died 1336), was Ilkhan from 1335 to 1336, during the disintegration of the Ilkhanate, the Mongol state in Southwest Asia based in Persia.

== Life ==
Not much is known of Arpa's earlier life, except that he was a member of the house of Tolui. His lineage traced back to Ariq Böke, who was the youngest brother of Möngke, Kublai and Hulagu. His grandfather Mingqan Ke'un was a son of Malik Temür and Emegen Khatun and arrived in Iran during the reign of Öljaitü in the summer of 1306.

== Reign ==
He was nominated to the throne by Abu Sa'id's vizier Ghiyas al-Din and was elected 5 days later with a regnal title Sultan Muiz al-Dunya wa'l Din Mahmud on Karabakh. Instead of a golden crown, he had a felt and simple waistband as regaila. Almost immediately he had to deal with an invasion by Özbeg of the Golden Horde. He defeated the invasion, and furthermore used it as a pretext for executing Abu Sa'id's widow Baghdad Khatun, accusing her of poisoning Abu Sa'id and allying with Özbeg. He afterwards married Sati Beg, Abu Sa'id's sister and widow of Chupan in order to legitimize his rule. Another execution was that of Mahmudshah Inju, former ruler of Fars province in March 1336 (he was imprisoned by Abu Sa'id earlier because of his attempt on the Ilkhan's life). He also gave Shaykh Hasan the overall command of armies.

He was characterized as not practising Islam and more in favour of Genghis Khan's Yasa, mostly ignoring laws of the Muslim khans like Ghazan and Abu Sa'id. His rule was not accepted by a part of the Oirats, whose leader, the governor of Baghdad Ali Padshah, was an uncle of Abu Sa'id and had his own designs on the throne. Claiming Abu Sa'id's wife Dilshad Khatun was still pregnant, he raised Musa, the grandson of Baydu as rightful heir to the throne. Oirat traditional rivalry with Ariq Böke's line could also be a factor in this rebellion.

After securing Shaykh Hasan's neutrality, Ali Padshah went on to fight Arpa on Jaghatu plains near Maraga culminating in the Battle of Jaghatu on 29 April 1336. Arpa's army was led by 60 umara, notably Hajji Taghay (son of Sutay, Governor of Diyarbakir), Uyghur commander Ögrünch, Torut (a son of Nari and relative of Narin Taghay), Ortuq-Shah (son of Alghu) and Chupan's son Sorgan Sira. However, soon some emirs defected to the side of Ali Padshah, such as Mahmud b. Essen Qutlugh and Sultanshah Nikruz. The battle was a defeat for Arpa and soon after he was captured in Sultaniya and killed on 15 May 1336 by Mahmudshah's son, Amir Jalal al-Din Mas'ud Shah.

Regnal titles
Preceded by Abu Sa'id	Ilkhan; 1335–1336	Succeeded by Musa
