= Sutay =

Viceroy of Diyar Bakr
- In office 1312–1316
- Monarch: Öljaitü
- Preceded by: Mulay
- Succeeded by: Irinjin

Viceroy of Ahlat
- In office 1316–1319
- Appointed by: Emir Sevinch
- Monarch: Abu Sa'id Bahadur Khan

Viceroy of Diyar Bakr
- In office 1319–1332
- Appointed by: Chupan
- Preceded by: Irinjin
- Succeeded by: Ali Padshah

Personal details
- Died: 1332 Mosul
- Relations: Sutayids

Sutay or Sutai (Mongolian: ᠰᠤᠲᠠᠶ, Persian: سوتای) (died 1332) was a Mongol emir and governor of Diyar Bakr. He was appointed by Öljaitü as viceroy. His descendants held Diyar Bakr in their hands following the dissolution of the Ilkhanate and made it hereditary.

== Background ==
His tribal affiliation is not known. Turkish historian Faruk Sümer proposed that he was of the Sunud tribe and Sutai was just an abbreviation for Sunitai (Mongolian: Сөнөд + ай, lit. 'Belonging to Sunud'). Ishayahu Landa too believes that Sutay was a member of the Sunud. According to Mamluk historian Al-Safadi, he took part in Siege of Baghdad and was over 100 years old when he died in 1332. But Faruk Sümer doubted that and proposed that Mamluk historians mistook him for Chagatay the Younger otherwise known as Sunitai - an emir from the Sunud tribe and Hulagu's mingghan commander.

== Career under Ghazan ==
He was an akhtachi (Mongolian: агтчин, lit. 'Groom or Stable master') and rose to prominence during Ghazan's viceroyalty in Khorasan. He served alongside Mulay, Qutlughshah and Nurin Aqa and fought in Ghazan's war against Nawruz from 1289 to 1294. He also commanded an army during Ghazan's war against Baydu in 1295. He was one of the executioners of vizier Sadr al-Din Zanjani with Qutlughshah on 30 April 1298. The next year he was sent with emir Qutlughshah to quell Sulamish's revolt in Anatolia. Sutai led a rear guard composed of 15,000 soldiers and won a victory after a decisive battle on 27 April 1299 near Akşehir (modern Suşehri). After quelling the rebellion, Sutay was continuously stationed in Anatolia as a commander of a Mongol garrison. He later took part in the Mongol raids into Palestine especially during 1300 to 1301.

== Under Öljaitü ==
Sutay kept his position as emir in the army during the reign of Öljaitü and joined his campaigns. He commanded a tümen on the right wing during Öljaitü's campaign in Gilan in 1307. He plundered Lahijan with Esen Qutlugh and later was dispatched towards Tamijan. He returned to his fiefs in Anatolia after the campaign and raided the Turcomans dwelling near Rumkale in 1308. This raiding party was intercepted by the Mamluk governor of Aleppo - Shams al-Din Qara Sonqur later. He was reported to leave his post for Baghdad on 10 January 1310 for unspecified reasons in Tarikh-i Uljaytu.

He was appointed as viceroy of Diyar Bakr by Öljaitü in 1312 after the death of Emir Mulay; with his headquarters in Mosul. He commanded a part of the right flank during Öljaitü's campaign in Syria during 1312 and 1313, while his son Hajji Taghay was stationed in the center. He raided some of Al-Nasir's armies near Aleppo in 1313.

== Under Abu Sa'id ==
He was relieved of viceroyalty in Diyar Bakr in 1316, upon the succession of Abu Sa'id by his chief commander Emir Sevinch. He was replaced by the Keraite emir Irinjin in Diyar Bakr while subsequently he was granted the viceroyalty of Ahlat. Sutai did not take part in Qurumshi and Irinjin's disastrous revolt in 1319, unlike his son Barambay, and was granted the viceroyalty of Diyar Bakr for a second time. Baranbay evaded persecution and fled to his father after 1319. After Sutai's return to Diyar Bakr, he granted Ahlat to his three sons as his subordinates, thus establishing a hereditary government. He was reconfirmed in his position after the Chupanid purge in 1327 and held this position until his death in 1332. His rule in Diyar Bakr was succeeded by Ali Padshah, the uncle of Abu Sa'id.

== Family ==
He was married to Buyan Agha, daughter of Möngke Temür and had at least two sons with her:

1. Hajji Taghay (d. 1343)
2. Baranbay
3. Pulad

Sutay's descendants, known in literature as Sutayids continued to rule Diyar Bakr, Diyar Rabia and Ahlat until the rise of the Kara Koyunlu.
