= Amir Vali =

Amir Vali (also spelled Wali) was the ruler of Astarabad and parts of Mazandaran from 1356 until 1366, and again from c. 1374 until 1384. His relatively long reign was dominated by conflict with the Sarbadars and the Jalayirids, and ended only upon the arrival of Timur into eastern Persia.

== Rise to Power ==
Amir Vali was the son of Shaykh 'Ali Hindu, who had been a supporter of the Ilkhanid claimant Togha Temür and had served as his governor in Astarabad. In 1353 Togha Temür was murdered by the Sarbadars, who annexed Astarabad. Vali avoided the slaughter of Togha Temür's adherents and sought refuge with the neighboring Jauni Kurban tribe.

The Sarbadar state soon descended into civil war, and Amir Vali decided to take advantage of the situation. He moved to Mazandaran, which he used as a staging point to launch raids into the region of Astarabad. The city at that time was ill-equipped to handle such attacks, as many of the Sarbadar forces had departed to partake in the civil war. In order to recruit supporters, he claimed to be acting in the name of Togha Temür's son Luqman. By the time Luqman had arrived on the scene, however, Vali had apparently decided to rule in his own name, told Luqman to depart, and sent into exile his relatives and supporters. Furthermore, he declared for the Shi'a in order to gain the support of the Shi'as of Mazandaran against the then-Sunni Sarbadars. After overwhelming a Sarbadar garrison near Astarabad, Amir Vali successfully fought off three armies sent to subdue him, including one led by the Sarbadar leader Hasan Damghani himself. In 1356, after the defeat of the first army sent against him, he conquered Astarabad itself. He then expanded, taking Bistam and Damghan from the Sarbadars in around 1360.

== Loss and Recovery of Astarabad ==
Eventually the Sarbadars, who since 1361 were under the leadership of 'Ali Mu'ayyad, were able to mount a serious counteroffensive, and Amir Vali was forced out of his territories, including Astarabad, in c. 1366. This defeat proved to be only a temporary one for Vali. Soon after losing Astarabad, he established a new power base by seizing Semnan from the Sarbadars. He then attempted to regain Astarabad, but failed. The next few years after that he went on the offensive against the Jalayirids to the west, campaigning in the region of Rey. The Jalayirid Shaikh Uvais stopped him, but was unable to follow up on his victory. Uvais tried to convince 'Ali Mu'ayyad to attack Vali, but the Sarbadar considered him to be a useful buffer against the Jalayirids and refused to move against him. During this time he temporarily switched his allegiance back to the Sunni, although this apparently didn't give him the boost in support he expected, since he reverted to the Shi'a after a few years.

A prolonged war between the Sarbadars and the Kartids of Herat allowed Amir Vali to expand his territories at the Sarbadars' expense. By 1374 at the latest he had retaken Astarabad, and sometime between 1374 and 1376 he invaded Khurasan and besieged Sabzavar, the Sarbadar capital. In 1376 or 1377 'Ali Mu'ayyad himself was overthrown by several radical dervishes who had enlisted Kartid support; he fled to Vali, who saw this as a useful opportunity to expand his influence in Khurasan. Vali laid siege to Sabzavar and took it in around 1380 and restored 'Ali Mu'ayyad in the capital.

== Conflict with Timur ==
In 1381 Amir Vali had his first encounter with the Amir Timur, who sacked Esfarayen when Vali refused to pay homage to him. Vali then proceeded to besiege Sabzavar again, after a falling out between him and 'Ali Mu'ayyad, and enlisted the support of the Jauni Kurban. 'Ali Mu'ayyad, who had already become Timur's vassal, appealed to him for aid, and Timur relieved the city in the winter 1382. He then proceeded to invade Gurgan, forcing Vali to sue for peace. In the following year (1383), Timur sent an army against Vali, then proceeded to invade his territories himself. Vali attempted to stop Timur but in the end he failed and fled to the Jalayirids in 1384, following which Timur occupied Astarabad. He then gave the city to IIkhanid claimant Toghai Temur son Luqman, whose name Vali had supposedly been acting in almost three decades ago, when he was first establishing himself in the region.

After his loss of power, Amir Vali spent some time in the service of the Jalayirids. He participated in defending Tabriz during the siege of Tokhtamysh, khan of the Golden Horde. After the city was sacked he travelled to Mazandaran, where he attempted to stage a rebellion against Timur in 1386. The rebellion failed and Vali was killed, bringing an end to his long career.

== See also ==
- Gerdkuh

== Footnotes ==
Preceded by Togha Temür	Ruler of Astarabad; 1356–1366, c. 1374–1384	Succeeded by Luqman
