= Sutayids =

14th-century Mongol dynasty

Sutayid Beylik Sutaylılar
- 1312–1352
- Government: Beylik
- Bey
  - 1350-1351: Pir Muhammad (last)
- Historical era: Middle Ages
  - Established: 1312
  - Disestablished: 1352
Preceded by	Succeeded by
Ilkhanate	Qara Qoyunlu
- Today part of: Turkey; Iraq

The Sutayids (Turkish: Sutaylılar) were a Mongol dynasty descended from Ilkhan Ghazan's commander Emir Sutay. Like other post-Ilkhanate Mongol dynasties, such as the Jalayirids and Chupanids, they were related to the Borjigin dynasty through marriage. Emir Sutay was a son-in-law of Hulagu Khan's son Möngke Temür. Their main area of activity ranged from Jazira in the south to Erzurum in the north.

== History ==
Their tribal origin is not known precisely, but Turkish historian Faruk Sümer attributed them to Sunud tribe of Mongols. According to him, Sutai was just an abbreviation for Sunitai (Mongolian: Сөнөд + ай, lit. 'Belonging to Sunud'). Ishayahu Landa too believes that Sutay was member of Sunud. Sutay served Ghazan, Öljaitü and Abu Sa'id until his death in 1332. His son Hajji Taghay inherited his fiefs and was often at odds with Oirats and allied to Jalayirids. Hajji Taghay was killed by his Chupanid supported nephew Ibrahimshah in 1343, who later changed his allegiance from Malek Ashraf to Suleyman Khan, Sati Beg and his son Surgan in 1345, but was defeated by former in Aladagh near Lake Van. Ibrahimshah died in 1350 following a stroke. With his death, Sutayid territories in Iraq was lost to the emir Hassan b. Hindu. His cousin Pir Muhammad succeeded in retaking Mosul but was murdered by his subordinate Huseyn b. Taybugha in 1351. Huseyn b. Taybugha himself was later murdered two years later by his subordinate, Bayram Khwaja.

The remaining Sutayids left the area for the Principality of Eretna and became known as the Barambays.

== List of rulers ==
1. Sutay (1312–1316 in Diyar Bakr, 1316–1319 in Ahlat, 1319–1332 in Diyar Bakr)
2. Hajji Taghay (1332–1343)
3. Ibrahimshah (1343–1350)
4. Pir Muhammad (1350–1351)

== Genealogy of House of Sutay ==
House of Sutay

Sutayid Beylik

Sutay
Hajji-Taghay r. 1336–1343	Baran-Beg
Husayn-Beg r. 1351–1353	Pir-Muhammad r. 1350–1351	Ibrahim-Shah r. 1343–1350
