= Togha Temür =

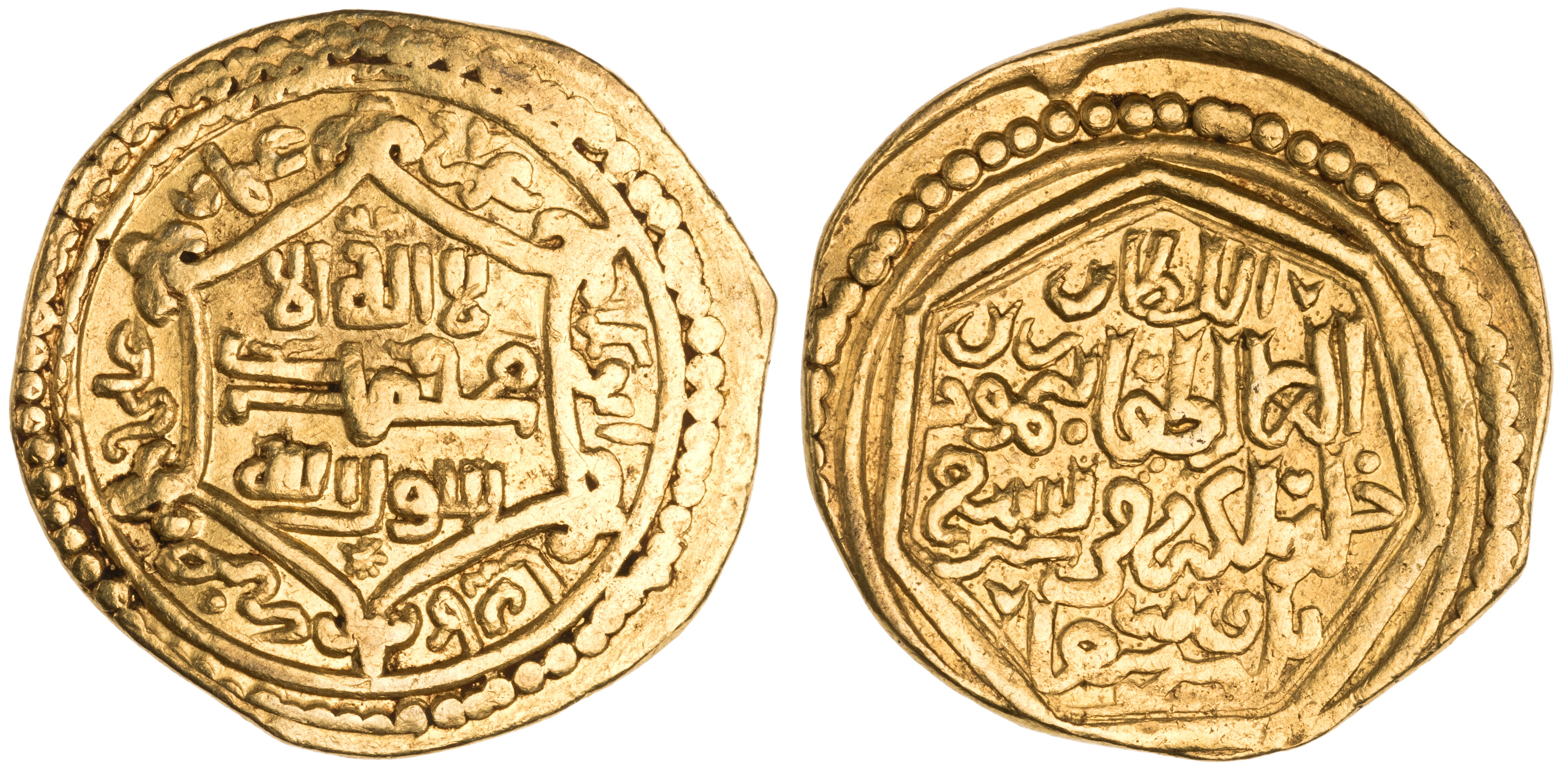
- Gold Dinar of Togha Temür, Kashan, 739 H, 1338-1339

Ilkhan (Claimant)
- Reign: 1337–1353
- Predecessor: Muḥammad
- Successor: Terminated Over by Amir Vali It was re-established by Timur under the name Ilkhan (Claimant) Luqmān-Pādishāh 1384
- Born: Unknown
- Died: December 1353

Togha Temür (died December 1353), also known as Ṭaghāytīmūr, was a claimant to the throne of the Ilkhanate in the mid-14th century. Of the many individuals who attempted to become Il khan after the death of Abu Sa'id Bahadur Khan, Togha Temür was the only one who hailed from eastern Iran, and was the last major candidate who was of the house of Genghis Khan. His base of power was Gorgan and western Khorasan. His name means "Bowl/Pot Iron" in Middle Mongol.

== Before the death of Abu Sa'id ==
Togha Temür descended from Genghis Khan's younger brother Qasar. Eventually, his family became the rulers of a nomadic tribe, the Chete. His grandfather, Baba Bahadur, had moved the Chete into the region between Astarabad (now Gorgan) and Kalbush on the east bank of the Gorgan. This region's principal cities were Astarabad and Gorgan. When Togha Temür became the leader of the Chete, they were still in this area.

== Struggles with the Jalayirids and Chobanids ==
A few months after the death of Ilkhan Abu Sa'id in 1335, Togha Temür became involved in the succession struggle. The governor of Khurasan, Shaykh ʿAli b. ʿAli Qushji, noting Togha Temür's relation to Genghis Khan, proposed naming him Ilkhan, and most of the princes of eastern Iran were convinced to accept him as sovereign. After his name was added to the coinage and in the official prayers, an expedition into western Iran was planned. In that part of the country two Ilkhans, Arpa Ke'un and Musa Khan, had already been overthrown, and it was believed that the troops of Khurasan could overcome the instability there.

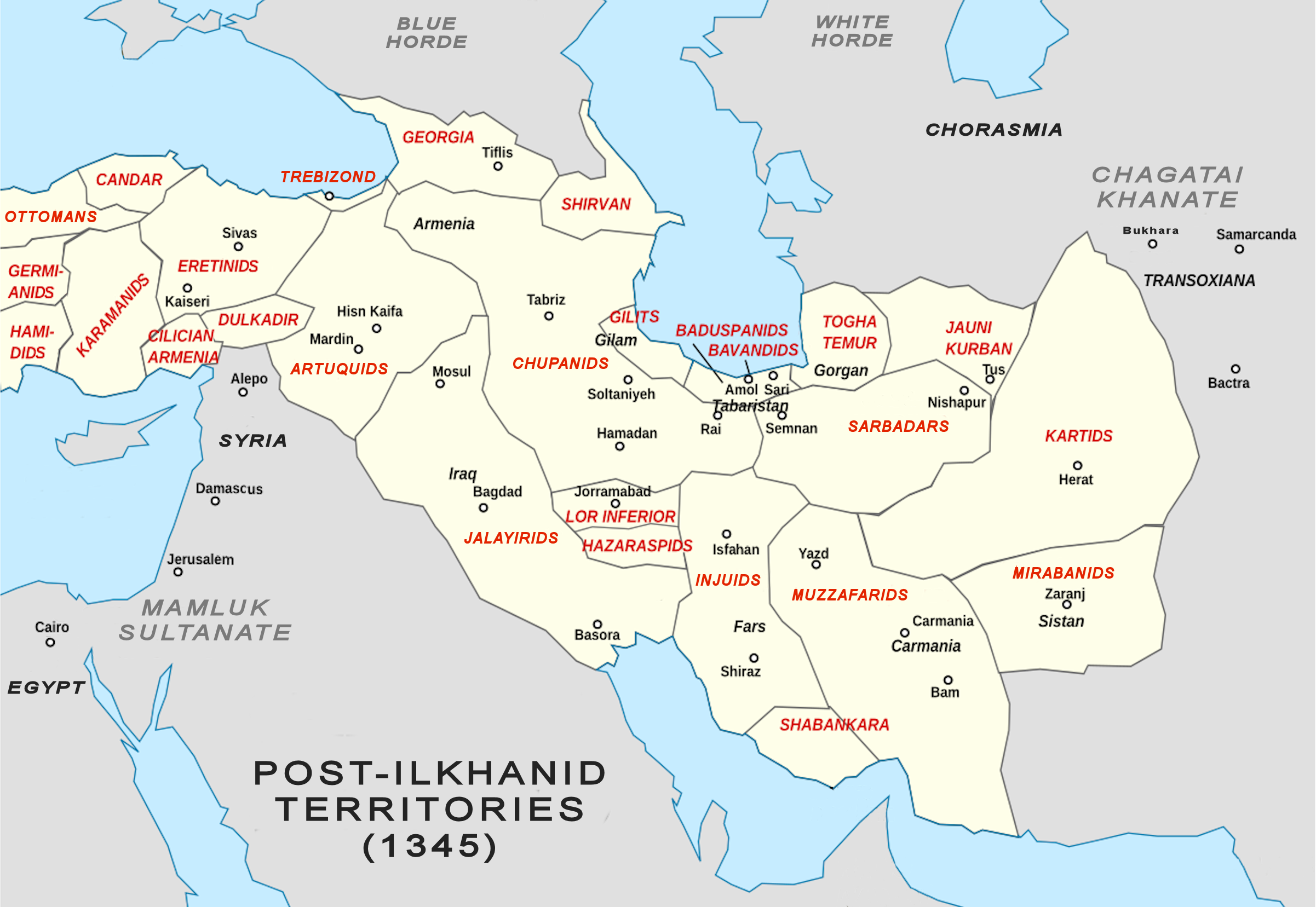
Post-Ilkhanid territories, with area held by Togha Temür (1345)

In the spring of 1337 Togha Temür's forces began the campaign. There was dissension within his ranks, however; several local princes resented the power of Shaykh ʿAli over the would-be Ilkhan, and hated the economic policies that he had been in charge of implementing as governor of Khurasan. As a result, two of his supporters, namely Arghun Shah, who was chief of the Jauni Qurban tribe, and ʿAbd-Allah b. Mulai, who held Kuhistan, withdrew from the campaign at Bistam. This was offset by the addition of the former Ilkhan Musa Khan and his troops, who had been in flight since their defeat by the Jalayirid Ḥasan Buzurg and his puppet khan, Muḥammad Khan. Together they occupied the old Ilkhan capital Soltaniyeh, but in June 1337 Ḥasan Buzurg met and defeated them on the field, forcing Togha Temür and Shaykh ʿAli to evacuate the region.

In July 1337, while returning to Khurasan, Shaykh ʿAli was captured by Arghun Shah, who executed him and sent his head to Ḥasan Buzurg. From this point on, Arghun Shah was Togha Temür's most powerful supporter. He convinced Togha Temür to resist Muhammad-i Mulai, who arrived in Khurasan to act as Hasan Buzurg's governor there. Togha Temür and Arghun Shah defeated and executed him in the fall of that year, making sure that Khurasan remained free of the Jalayirids.

Less than a year later, Togha Temür was again drawn into events in the west. Ḥasan Buzurg's rule there had been contested by the Chobanid Ḥasan Kuchak, who had defeated the Jalayirids, killed Ḥasan Buzurg's puppet khan, and taken control of Tabriz in July 1338. In response, Ḥasan Buzurg requested the assistance of Togha Temür. After consulting Arghun Shah, he accepted, and in 1339 he returned to western Iran. As part of the deal, Ḥasan Buzurg recognized him as Ilkhan.

Ḥasan Kuchak, however, acted quickly to destroy the alliance. He sent a letter to Togha Temür, offering him the hand of his own Ilkhan puppet, the princess Sati Beg, in marriage with the prospect of an alliance between the Chobanids and Khurasanis. Another account has Ḥasan Kuchak offer to turn over the province of Arab Iraq to Togha Temür as an incentive for allying with him against Ḥasan Buzurg. Togha Temür was pleased with the idea, so he sent a response accepting the offer. Ḥasan Kuchak then forwarded the response to Ḥasan Buzurg with a supplementary letter warning him that Togha Temür was an untrustworthy person and claiming that the Jalayirids and Chobanids believed in many of the same things and could together work towards the reunification of the Ilkhanid state.

Ḥasan Buzurg, believing his Chobanid rival, decided to turn against the Khurasanis. With both Jalayirid and Chobanid forces opposing him, Togha Temür had little choice but to return to Khurasan. Although in 1340 Togha Temür was again recognized by Ḥasan Buzurg as Ilkhan, and continued to be recognized as such until 1344, his attempts to unify the Ilkhanate under his rule had effectively failed. Following the defeat of his the forces Togha Temür had sent against the Chobanids under the leadership of his brother Shaykh-ʿAli Ke'ün in 1340, Togha Temür no longer attempted to assert his authority in the west by force. The regular Khurasani army had been decimated, leaving Togha Temür dependent on his and his allies' tribal forces, which were insufficient to conquer the west, although he continued to be recognized as ruler in much of Khurasan, Gurgan, and Mazandaran.

== Conflict with the Sarbadars ==
In the west the Jalayirids and Chobanids had prevented Togha Temür from extending his rule across much of the Ilkhanate. Another group opposed him much more directly - they threatened his rule in Khurasan itself. The Sarbadars came to power by revolting against one of Togha Temür's subordinates, ʿAlaʾ-ad-Din Muḥammad, as a result of increasingly harsh tax demands. Initially the Sarbadars claimed that their revolt was against ʿAlaʾ-ad-Din only and not against Togha Temür, and continued to place Togha Temür's name on their coins. When they attacked Arghun Shah's Jauni Qurban in 1340, however, Togha Temür was prompted to send his forces against them, but they were defeated in the ensuing conflict, and both ʿAlaʾ-ad-Din and ʿAbd-Allah b. Mulai were killed. Togha Temür's brother, Shaykh-ʿAli Ke'ün, also fell in battle against the Sarbadars, in May 1343. Following this, the Sarbadars took much of Khurasan and transferred their allegiance to the Chobanids, recognizing Ḥasan Kuchak's puppet khan Sulayman.

Togha Temür and his supporters fled to the Jajrud valley, to the south of Amol (in Mazandaran), whose ruler, the Bavandid Ḥasan II, was his vassal. In 1344 the Sarbadars decided to wipe out Togha Temür and moved against him, but the Bavandids trapped their army and killed their leader, Masʿud. This allowed Togha Temür to reclaim much of the territory the Sarbadars had captured, and he even regained their allegiance for a few years.

Despite this, the Sarbadars continued to pose a threat. Togha Temür was not helped by the death of his ally Arghun Shah, who died in 1345 or 1346, after which the Jauni Kurban ceased to support him against the Sarbadars. By 1347/1348, the Sarbadars, apparently under the leadership of Shams-ad-Din ʿAli, were issuing coins that asserted their independence, failing to name any Ilkhan. Sarbadar opposition to Togha Temür continued until Yaḥya Karawi assumed the leadership of the Sarbadars in 1351/1352. He decided to submit to Togha Temür, minted coins in his name, sent him tribute, and promised to present himself before the khan every year. Togha Temür accepted this proposal, and it seemed like peace had been achieved. However, Yaḥya did not intend to remain Togha Temür's vassal. In November or December 1353 Yaḥya and a group of Sarbadars presented themselves before Togha Temür in his camp. They struck him down with either an axe or an arrow, beheaded him, and slaughtered his family and his army and killed the nomads' animals.

Much of Togha Temür's territories then passed into the Sarbadars' hands again. The remaining lands were supposed to pass to his son Luqman-Padishah, but Amir Vali, the son of Togha Temür's governor of Astarabad, Shaykh-ʿAli Hindu, seized power for himself; it was he who continued the struggle with the Sarbadars. Togha Temür's son Luqman-Padishah succeeded to his father's rule at Astarabad and in Jurjan only after Timur expelled Amir Vali and replaced him with Luqman-Padishah as his vassal, in 1384.

== Legacy ==
Togha Temür, a descendant of Hasar, was the last powerful claimant to the throne of the Ilkhanate in the mid-14th century. The family was known as the Hasar (Qasar) clan. With the death of Togha Temür at the hands of the Sarbadars of northern Khurasan in the mid-1300s, it is possible that the surviving members of the Hasar (Qasar) clan escaped into the mountains of what is today Afghanistan, where their descendants maintained their clan name of Hasar, which evolved over time into Hasara or Hazaras. As the Hazara people do not have a written history of their own, nothing can be proven, but this theory is more likely versus the theory that the name Hazara comes from the Persian word for "one thousand," which is actually, "hezar (hezār هزار)." As these Il Khanate Mongols had converted to Shia Islam and married Persian-speaking Persian women, their children had been raised as Shia Muslims with a mixed Mongol-Persian characteristic. This explains the current culture of Hazaras people very well.

== Family ==
Togha Temür had at least six sons and two daughters. Based primarily on the genealogical compendium Muʿizz al-anṣāb, the family included:

Ṭaghāy-Tīmūr (Togha Temür), Ilkhan 1338–1339, ruler of Astarabad, Mazandaran, and Gurgan 1339–1353

- Qazān-Pādishāh
- ʿAbd-al-ʿAzīz
- Abū-Saʿīd
- Luqmān-Pādishāh, ruler of Astarabad 1384–1388
  - Pīr-Pādishāh (or Pīrak), ruler of Astarabad 1388–1406, died 1410
    - Sulṭān-Ḥasan
    - Sulṭān-Ḥusayn
    - ʿAlī-Sulṭān
- Bābuq-Bīk
- Dawlat-Shāh Timur's Wife
- Sulṭān-Khātūn (died after 1381), the wife of Muʿizz-ad-Dīn Pīr-Ḥusayn-Muḥammad, the Kart (Kurt) ruler of Herat 1332–1370, and the mother of Ghiyāth-ad-Dīn II Pīr-ʿAlī, also ruler of Herat 1370–1389

== Genealogy ==
According to the Muʿizz al-ansāb, Togha Temür's ancestry was as follows:

- Yīsūgāy Bahādur (Yesugei, father of Genghis Khan)
- Jūjī Qasār (Jochi Qasar)
- Baqsah
- Abūkān (Ebügen)
- Bābā Bahādur
- Suday
- Ṭaghāy-Tīmūr (Togha Temür)

Togha Temür's pedigree is reported variously in the sources, another version being that provided by Khwandamir (Togha-Temür, son of Baba Bahadur, son of Äbügäi, son of Ämägän, son of Toqu, son of Jöchi Qasar), which is demonstrably wrong.

== Bibliography ==
- Jackson, Peter. The Cambridge History of Iran, Volume Six: The Timurid and Safavid Periods. Cambridge University Press, 1968. ISBN 0-521-20094-6
- Smith, Jr., John Masson. The History of the Sarbadar Dynasty 1336-1381 A.D. and Its Sources. The Hague: Mouton, 1970. ISBN 90-279-1714-0
- Thackston, W. M. (transl.), Khwandamir, Habibu's-siyar: Reign of the Mongol and the Turk. 3. In 2 parts. Cambridge, MA, 1994.
- Vohidov, Š. H. (transl.), Istorija Kazahstana v persidskih istočnikah. 3. Muʿizz al-ansāb. Almaty, 2006.
- Wing, Patrick, The Jalayirids: Dynastic State Formation in the Mongol Middle East, Edinburgh, 2016.
