= Jumghur =

- Born: March 1234; Mongolia
- Died: c. 1264; Samarqand
- House: Borjigin
- Dynasty: Hulaguid
- Father: Hulagu Khan
- Mother: Guyuk Khatun

Jumghur (Persian: جومقور) was the second son of Genghis Khan's grandson Hulagu. Although according to some researchers, he may have been the eldest one.

== Life ==
He was born to Hulagu and his Oirat wife Guyuk Khatun in 1234. He was descended from Genghis Khan on both sides: Hulagu was his grandson through Tolui, and Guyuk was his granddaughter through Checheikhen. His maternal grandfather was Toralchi Güregen, one of the sons of Qutuqa Beki.

He was left behind in Mongolia with Möngke when Hulagu left for Iran in 1253. Entrusted with his father's other wives' ordu, he settled near Almaliq. However he soon found himself in a succession crisis between his uncles Kublai and Ariq Böke in 1259 and had to support the latter. Not much after Ariq's move against Alghu in 1263 and his surrender in the later year he deserted and left for Iran with a host of other relatives of Hulagu - his wife Qutui Khatun, his brothers Taraghai, Tekshin, Teküder and others. Hearing the news, Hulagu sent one of his commanders, Abatai Noyan, to accompany them. However, Jumghur fell ill and died in Samarqand en route. His family reached Iran without him. An angered Hulagu lashed Abatai with 60 lashes, accusing him of not taking care of Jumghur appropriately.

== Family ==
Jumghur had two chief wives and a few concubines:

- Tolun Khatun — daughter of Buqa Timur, brother of his mother Guyuk Khatun.
  - Orghudaq — married Shadai Güregen (great-grandson of Chilaun)
    - Günjishkab — married Ghazan, later Öljaitü.
- Ja'urchi Khatun — sister of Bulughan Khatun
- By concubines
  - Jushkab (d. June 1289)
  - Kingshu (d. 1289)
    - Shiremun (d. after 1307)
    - Toghacaq Khatun (d. 19 Jan 1291) — married Teküder.
  - Injitai — married to Möngke Temür, son of Hulagu.

His family received estates around Salmas after their arrival in Iran.
