= Rukn al-Din Mubarak Khwaja =

Ruler of Kirman
- Reign: 1235 - 1253
- Predecessor: Qutb al-Din Mohammad (first reign)
- Successor: Qutb al-Din Mohammad (second reign)
- Died: 1253; Kerman
- Spouse: Jahan Khatun
Names
- Rukn al-Din Abu'l Muzaffar Mubarak Khwaja
- Father: Buraq Hajib
- Mother: Uka khatun

Rukn al-Din Mubarak Khwaja was a Qutlugkhanid ruler of Kerman and the son of Buraq Hajib, founder of the dynasty.

== Life ==
He was the only son of Buraq Hajib and Uka Khatun. He was sent to court of Ögedei Khan in 1234 by his father as a gesture of submission. He did not return to Kirman upon hearing of his father's death but continued his journey, which eventually secured his recognition by Khan. He was trusted to be tutored by Chinqai, a Nestorian Uyghur secretary of Ögedei and Güyük. Indeed, his deposed cousin Qutb al-Din Mohammad was held in Mongol court thanks to Chinqai's efforts.

== Reign ==
He was not popular among Persian population and clerics of Kirman during his 16 year long reign. Although he had to abdicate in favor Qutb al-Din Mohammad according to the order of Möngke in 1252/1253. He left his domains and set out to Luristan, first fleeing to his nephew Salghur shah - Atabeg of Yazd with his mother Uka Khatun in 1252, later getting into contact with Caliph al-Mustasim. He was ambushed by Mongol forces along the way to Baghdad. When Möngke heard of this treason thanks to the commander Buqa who ambushed, he authorised Qutb al-Din to execute his cousin.

== Family ==
He was married to Jahan Khatun, daughter of Salghurid atabeg Abubakr b. Sad. However this marriage only lasted a night. His other issues include:

- Suleimanshah
- A daughter — married to Ala ad-Din b. Toghanshah, Atabeg of Yazd
- A daughter — married to Imad ad-Din b. Hazarasp, Atabeg of Luristan
- Bibi Shah — a concubine to Mengü Timur (son of Hulegu)
