= Sati Beg =

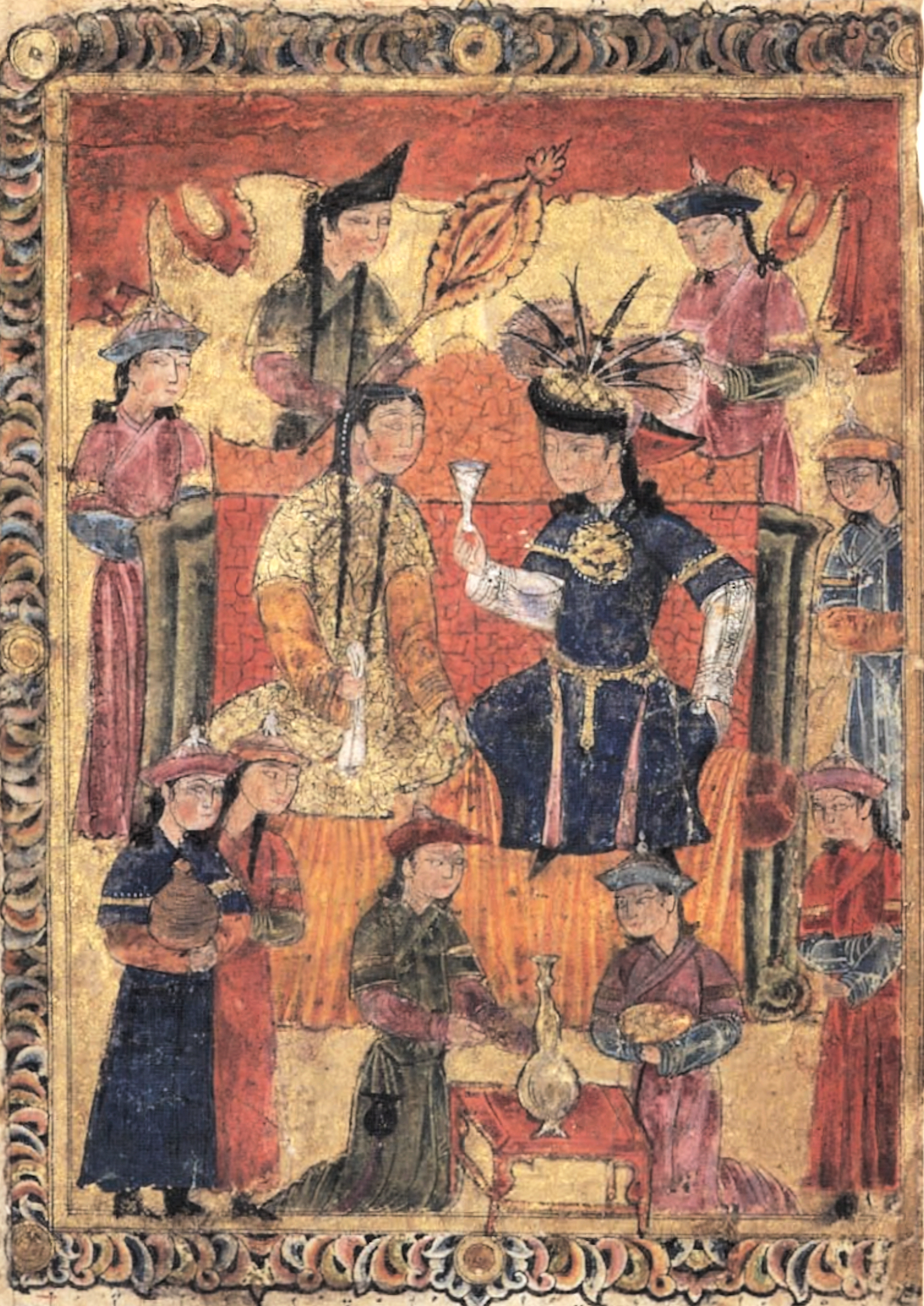
- A possible contemporary depiction of Sati Beg (enthroned, left, with her husband or her son). Mu'nis al-ahrar frontipiece, Isfahan, 1341.

Il-Khan Chupanid puppet
- Reign: July/August 1338 - May 1339
- Predecessor: Muhammad
- Successor: Suleiman Khan
- Vizier: Rukn al-Dīn Shaykhī Rashīdī; Ghiyāth al-Dīn Muḥammad ‘Alīshāhī

Empress consort of the Ilkhanate
- Tenure: 1335–1336, 1339–1343
- Spouse: Chupan; Arpa Ke'un; Suleiman Khan
- Issue: Surgan Sira
- House: Borjigin
- Father: Öljaitü
- Mother: Eltuzmish Khatun

Sati Beg (fl. 1316–1345) was an Ilkhanid princess, the sister of Il-Khan Abu Sa'id (r. 1316–1333). She was the consort of amir Chupan (1319–1327), Il-Khan Arpa (r. 1335–36), and Il-Khan Suleiman (r. 1339–1343). In 1338–39, she was briefly the Ilkhanid khatun (queen regnant) during internal conflicts (and fragmentation), appointed by a Chobanid faction led by Hassan Kuchak.

== Life ==
She was born as the daughter of Öljaitü and his Khongirad wife Eltuzmish Khatun. Upon her brother's accession in 1316, Sati Beg was betrothed to the amir Chupan, one of the most powerful individuals in the Ilkhanid court. They were wed on 6 September 1319; their marriage produced a son, Surgan. When Chupan and Abu Sa'id came into conflict in 1327, Sati Beg was returned to the Ilkhan. Chupan was executed that same year at Abu Sa'id's insistence; the lives of Sati Beg and Surgan were spared.

=== Reign ===
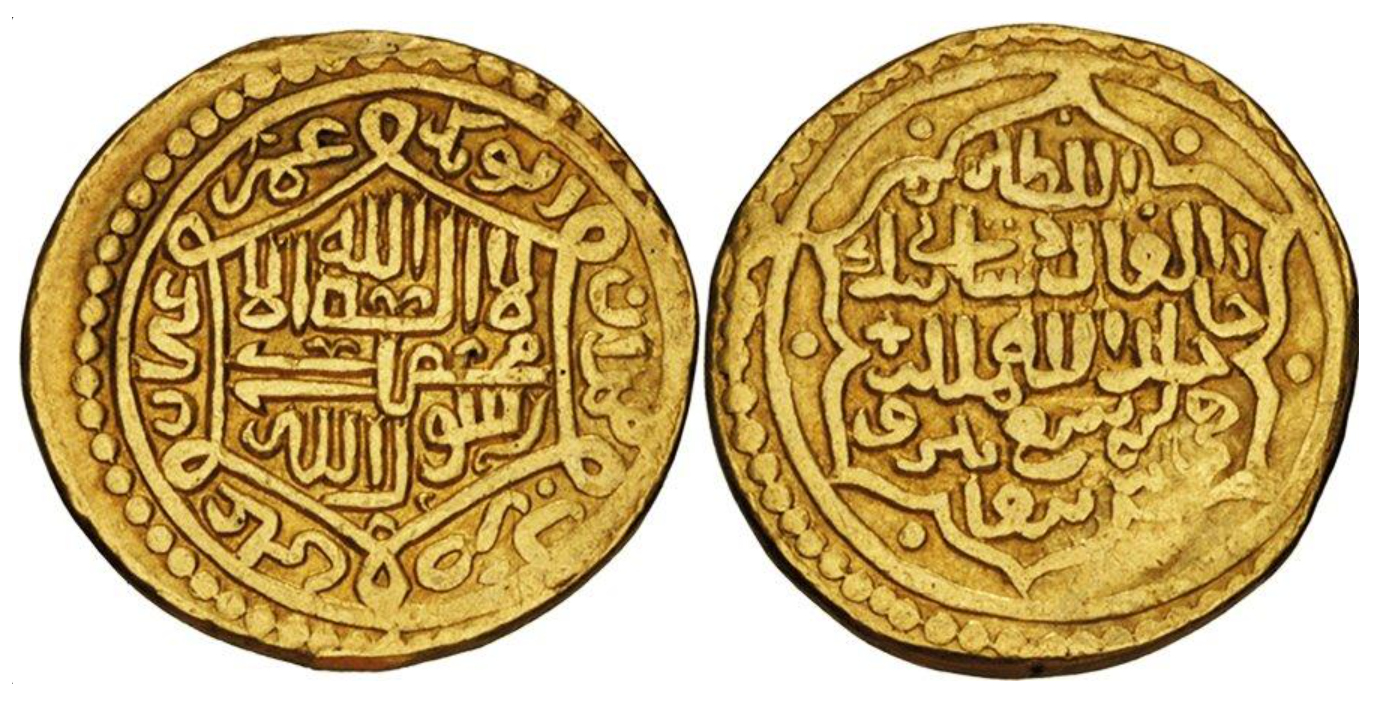
Coin circa AH 739 referencing Ilkhanids. Sati Beg, Queen.

Following Abu Sa'id's death in 1335, the Ilkhanate began to disintegrate. By 1336, Sati Beg and Surgan had taken the side of Arpa Ke'un, Sati Beg herself marrying him. However, after his death, they joined forces with the founder of the Jalayirid dynasty, Hasan Buzurg. After the latter seized control of western Persia, Surgan was made governor of Karabakh (in modern Azerbaijan), where he and his mother moved to. However, when a grandson of Chupan, Hasan Kucek, defeated Hasan Buzurg in July 1338, Sati Beg and Surgan defected to his camp. Taking advantage of her family ties, Hasan Kucek raised Sati Beg to the Ilkhanid throne in July or August of that year. Her viziers were also from famous families in Iran. Her nominal authority only extended to the Chobanid domains of northwestern Persia.

Sati Beg issued coins using the title sultan or sultana.

Hasan Buzurg, who still controlled southwestern Persia and Iraq, requested the assistance of another claimant of the Ilkhanid throne named Togha Temur. The latter invaded the Chobanid lands in early 1339. Hasan Kucek, however, promised Sati Beg's hand in marriage to him in exchange for an alliance. This proved, however, to be a ruse; the intent was merely to alienate Hasan Buzurg from Togha Temur. The Jalayirids withdrew their support, and Togha Temur was forced to retreat without gaining Sati Beg's hand in marriage. Meanwhile, Hasan Kucek was growing suspicious of Sati Beg and her son. Realizing that she was too valuable to be removed completely, he deposed her and then forced her to marry his new candidate for the throne, Suleiman Khan.

=== Later life ===
Hasan Kucek was murdered late in 1343; Sati Beg's son Surgan found himself competing for control of the Chobanid lands with the late ruler's brother Malek Ashraf and his uncle Yagi Basti. When Malek Ashraf defeated him, he fled to his mother and stepfather. The three of them then formed an alliance, but when Hasan Buzurg decided to withdraw the support he promised, the plan fell apart, and they fled to Diyarbakir. Surgan was defeated again in 1345 by Malek Ashraf and they fled to Anatolia. Coinage dating from 1342/1343 in Hesn Kayfa and Arzan (in Georgia) (dated 1345) in Sati Beg's name is the last trace of her. Surgan moved from Anatolia to Baghdad, where he was eventually executed by Hasan Buzurg; Sati Beg may have suffered the same fate, but this is unknown.

== Sources ==
- Charles Melville and 'Abbas Zaryab. "Chobanids." Encyclopedia Iranica. URL: http://www.iranica.com/articles/search/searchpdf.isc?ReqStrPDFPath=/home1/iranica/articles/v5_articles/chobanids&OptStrLogFile=/home/iranica/public_html/logs/pdfdownload.html
- Peter Jackson (1986). The Cambridge History of Iran, Volume Six: The Timurid and Safavid Periods. ISBN 0-521-20094-6
- Women in power (1300-1350)

| Preceded by Muhammad Khan (Ilkhan) | Ilkhan (Chobanid candidate); 1338–1339 | Succeeded by Suleiman Khan |
