= Nawrūz (Mongol emir) =

13th century Mongol Naib of Ilkhanate and Ilkhanate emir of Khorasan

Naib of Ilkhanate
- In office 1295–1297
- Monarch: Ghazan
- Preceded by: Jamal ud-Din Dastgerdani
- Succeeded by: Sadr al-Din Khaladi

Ilkhanate emir of Khorasan
- In office 1284–1289
- Monarch: Arghun
- Preceded by: Arghun Aqa
- Succeeded by: Nurin Aqa

Personal details
- Died: 13 August 1297 Herat

Nawrūz (Persian: نوروز; died 13 August 1297) was a son of governor Arghun Aqa and a powerful 13th-century Oirat emir who played an important role in the politics of the Mongol Ilkhanate.

== Early career ==
He inherited his father's administrative job in Khorasan and was listed as emir and son-in-law of Abaqa in medieval chroniclers' works. He supported Arghun against Teküder in 1284 and was rewarded by being atabeg of his 13-year-old son Ghazan and Prince Kingshü (son of Jumghur) as Ghazan's subordinate in Khorasan thanks to the new kingmaker Buqa. He held this powerful position of being the autonomous de facto ruler of Khorasan until Arghun Khan's arrest of Buqa.

== Rebellion ==
Hearing of the arrival of an Ilkhanate army towards Khorasan, Nawrūz led a revolt against Arghun, possibly proclaiming Hulachu (son of Hulagu) and Kingshü (who seems to have died or been executed sometime during the revolt) as new ilkhan, captured his commander Tegine Yarguchi, and banished his former ward Ghazan to Mazandaran in 1289. He gained his second victory over Prince Ghazan near Radkan, forcing him to go back to Mazandaran. In the autumn of 1289, he had to face a new army sent by Arghun under the leadership of Nurin Aqa – emir of Iraq and Prince Baydu. Being overwhelmed, Nawruz fell back to Jam and lost territories. Nawruz followed a scorched earth strategy in the winter in order to halt the advance of Ilkhan's armies, which proved effective when Baydu returned West with half of his army in 1290. Using this opportunity, Nawruz crossed the Oxus and fled the Ilkhanate. He joined Kaidu and managed to secure 30.000 soldiers from the Ögedeid retinue. He was appointed as governor of Badakhshan by Kaidu and minted coins in his name.

In 1291 Nawruz invaded Khorasan with Ögedeid armies along with Sarban and Ebugen – sons of Kaidu – reaching Mashhad. Arghun's death in 1291 created more room for maneuver to Nawruz who laid siege to different parts of the province. He soon abandoned Kaidu as well, this time allying himself with Kadan's grandson Ürük Temür, giving his daughter to him in marriage and sponsoring his conversion to Islam. With a new Borjigid puppet-prince, Nawruz issued yarlighs, but this proved ineffective as well, since Ürük Temür rejoined Kaidu after a while. Losing his legitimacy, Nawruz sought to make peace with Ghazan and submitted in 1294.

== Rise and fall under Ghazan ==
Nawruz pledged to raise Ghazan to the throne after Gaykhatu's death on the condition of his conversion to Islam. Managing to gain the loyalty of emirs like Taghachar, Chupan, Irinjin and Qurumushi, Nawruz ensured Ghazan's victory over Baydu in 1295. He was subsequently named naib of the state by Ghazan after his coronation. Nawruz appointed his brothers, Lagzi Güregen to watch over financial issues and Hajji Narin to oversee divan. As a fervent adherent to Islam; the History of Mar Yahballaha and Rabban Sauma portrays him as a ferocious enemy of Nestorian Christians. With Islam being the new state religion, Nawruz ordered all Buddhist and Christian temples to be destroyed or converted to mosques.

Nawruz headed Ghazan's army against Chagatai khan Duwa's invasion of Khorasan in 1295. However the Ilkhanid prince Sogai (son of Yoshmut) refused to join the campaign in Khorasan, believing this was a plot of Nawruz to further deprive nobility of their possessions. Nawruz informed Ghazan of this plot and he subsequently executed him. However, Nawruz soon embroiled himself in an argument with Nurin Aqa, who was more popular with the military and left Khorasan. After returning West, he survived an assassination attempt by a soldier named Tuqtay, who claimed that Nawruz murdered his own father, Arghun Aqa. Soon he was accused of treason by Sadr al-Din Khaladi, sahib-divan of Ghazan by forming a secret alliance with Mamluks. Indeed, according to Mamluk sources, Nawruz corresponded with Sultan Lajin.

Using this opportunity Ghazan started a purge against Nawruz and his followers in May 1297. His brother Hajji Narin and his follower Satalmish were executed along with Nawruz's children in Hamadan, his other brother Lagzi Güregen was also put to death in Iraq on 2 April 1297. His 12-year-old son Toghai was spared due to the efforts of Bulughan Khatun Khurasani, Ghazan's wife Arghun Aqa's granddaughter and given to the household of Amir Husayn. Others spared were his brother Yol Qutluq and his nephew Kuchluk.

Emir Kutlushah was ordered to pursue Nawruz and kill him. Kutlushah's armies defeated Nawruz near Jam and Nishapur. Following these defeats, Nawrūz took refuge at the court of the malik Fakhr al-Din of Herat, in northern Afghanistan, but the latter betrayed him and delivered him to Qutluqshah, who had him executed immediately on 13 August 1297, along with his brothers Hajji and Bulquq. Nawruz's severed head was mutilated and hung on the gates of Baghdad.

== Family ==
He was a son of Arghun Aqa and a woman called Sürmish and had offspring by several wives. Known issue:

- Toghanchuq Khatun (d. 1291) — daughter of Abaqa and Kawkabi Egachi
- Sultan Nasab Khatun — daughter of Ala al-Dawla (Atabeg of Yazd)
  1. Sultanshah — granted government of Yazd by Baydu, never assumed it.
- With other wives
  1. Arghunshah — controlled puppet ilkhan Togha Temür
  2. A daughter — married to Sarban, son of Kaidu
  3. A daughter — married to Ürük Temür, son of Yeye, son of Kadan
  4. Ordu Buqa (executed on 1297)
  5. Toghai (b. 1285)

== Biographies ==
- Namık Kemal — Biography of Emir Nawruz (Ottoman Turkish: ترجمۀ حال امير نوروز, romanized: Terceme-i Hâl-i Emir Nevruz), La Turquie ve Şark, Constantinople, 28 March 1875, republished in 1884 by Matbaayi-Ebüzziya
