= Möngke Temür (Ilkhanate) =

Ilkhanate prince (1256–1282)

Ruler of Shiraz
- Reign: 1272–1282
- Predecessor: Abish Khatun
- Successor: Abish Khatun
- Co-ruler: Abish Khatun
- Born: 23 October 1256; Ilkhanate
- Died: 26 April 1282 (aged 25); Cizre, Mosul, Ilkhanate
- Spouse: Abish Khatun
- Issue: Kurdujin Khatun
- House: Borjigin
- Dynasty: Hulaguid
- Father: Hulagu
- Mother: Öljei Khatun

Möngke Temür (Mongolian: Мөнхтөмөр, lit. 'Eternal Iron', ᠮᠦᠨᠺᠬᠲᠡᠮᠦᠷ; Chinese: 蒙哥帖木兒), also known as Tash Möngke, was one of the sons of il-khan Hulagu. He ruled over the Ilkhanate, a division of the Mongol Empire.

== Life ==
Rashid al-Din gives detailed account of his birth on Jami' al-Tawarikh - he was born to Hulagu and his Oirat wife Öljei on 23 October 1256 at night. He was youngest son of his father. At age of 5 he was betrothed to Abish Khatun, marrying her in 1272, also gaining governance of Shiraz.

He was appointed by his brother Abaqa to organize defense lines on Caucasus against Golden Horde at the start of his career in 1266. Later he moved on to the Egyptian border, heading a 50,000 strong army towards Mamluk sultan Qalawun in 1281. He was aided by Armenians under Leo II and Georgians under Demetrius II. Möngke was wounded during the battle and subsequently fled. He stayed for a while at Mosul to recover. His main supporters for throne were his mother Öljei and his Oirat kinsmen after Abaqa's death. However, he also died unexpectedly several days on 26 April 1282. According to Rashid al-Din, he was his brother's chosen successor. His descendant Pir Husayn, was the last legitimate Hülaguid to hold the throne.

== Family ==
He married several times with issues:

- Principal wife — Öljei Khatun (his cousin and daughter of Buqa Timur of Oirats)
  - Ara Qutlugh — married to Taraghai (son of Buqa Timur and his Möngke's cousin), later married to Tuladai Noyan
- Second, later principal wife — Abish Khatun (betrothed in 1261, married in 1272)
  - Kurdujin Khatun — Ruler of Kirman, later married to Chupan
- Nojin Khatun (daughter of Durabai Noyan - governor of Diyar Bakr)
- Injitai — daughter of Jumghur

Concubines:

- Alinaq Egechi
  - Anbarchi (accused of rebellion in 1292, d. 24 September 1294 in Nakhchivan)
    - Esen Temür
      - Yol Qutlugh
        - Pir Husayn (d. 1338)
    - Qonchi
    - Qutuqtai (married to Arap Noyan, son of Samagar)
  - Taiju (executed on 15 April 1298 on the order of Ghazan)
    - Pulad (executed with his father)
  - Girei (d. 3 June 1294)
- Bibi Shah (daughter of Rukn al-Din Mubarak Khwaja of Kerman)
- A concubine
  - Buyan Agha — married to Sutai Noyan, governor of Diyar Bakr during Öljaitü and Abu Said
    - Hajji Taghai (d. 1343)
    - Baranbai
