= Tumen (unit) =

Unit of 10,000 soldiers

Tumen, or tümen ("unit of ten thousand"; Old Turkic: tümän; Mongolian: Түмэн, tümen; Turkish: tümen), was a decimal unit of measurement used by the Turkic and Mongol peoples to quantify and organize their societies in groups of 10,000. A tumen denotes an administrative unit of 10,000 households, or a military unit of 10,000 soldiers.

English Orientalist Sir Gerard Clauson (1891-1974) defined tümän as immediately borrowed from Tocharian tmān, which according to Edwin G. Pulleyblank might have been etymologically inherited from Old Chinese tman or 萬.

== Magyar military organization of the conquest era ==
It was thought that the same kind of military organization was used by the Magyars during the conquest of Hungary. According to Ahmad ibn Rustah (c. 930), a Persian explorer and geographer relying on second-hand information, the "Magyars are a race of Turks and their king rides out with horsemen to the number of 10,000 and this king is called Kanda".

== Genghis Khan's organization ==
In Genghis Khan's military system, a tumen was recursively built from units of 10 (aravt), 100 (zuut) and 1000 (mingghan), each with a leader reporting to the next higher level. Tumens were considered a practical size, neither too small for an effective campaign nor too big for efficient transport and supply. The military strategy was based on using tumens as a useful building block for shock assaults. A Mongol army usually consisted of three tumen, but armies consisting of only one tumen were also deployed. Regardless, tumen would often be understrength and the number of tumen deployed doesn't provide an accurate number of combatants.

The commander of a tumen was a tümen-ü noyan, a term sometimes translated as "myriarch" (cf. myriad), meaning commander of 10,000.

== In modern armies ==
Tümen is a military unit still used in the Turkish Land Forces, comprising 6000 to 10000 soldiers. Its commander is a tümgeneral "major general" there and in the Air Force and a tümamiral "rear admiral" in the Naval Forces. It is the equivalent of a modern division.

== See also ==
- Touman, the name of an emperor of the Xiongnu peoples of Central Asia
- Military of the Mongol Empire
- Tyumen—the name originates from tumen
- Tumen River
- Iranian toman
- Mingghan
- Myriad = 10,000
