= Mingghan =

Mongol regiment of 1,000 men

The mingghan (Uzbek: Minggʻan, Halh Mongolian: мянгат, romanized: Myangat) was a social-military unit of 1,000 households created by Genghis Khan. From this group could be recruited a regiment of 1,000 men. It is part of the ancient method of organization developed by Eurasian nomads based on the decimal system. A tumen, which included 10,000 households and soldiers, was the largest group and it was divided into ten mingghan. A mingghan was made up of 10 jaghuns or 100 arbans. An account cited that once he becomes a guard, a mingghan commander's son has to bring a younger brother and 10 other men to serve with him.

== See also ==
- Mongol Empire
- Mongol military tactics and organization
- Tumen
