= Il khan =

Mongolian and Turkic ruler title

Il Khan (also il-khan, ilkhan, elkhan, etc.), in Turkic languages and Mongolian, is a title of leadership. It combines the title khan with the prefix el/il, from the word ulus – 'tribe, clan', 'the people', 'nation', 'homeland', 'state', 'tribal union', etc.

== Meaning ==
The exact meaning depends on context:

- Khan of the nation. The earliest mention of a similar title in this meaning, namely "Illig Qaghan", refers to Bumin Qaghan and dates to 552 CE. (In fact, Nikolai Gumilyov transcribes Bumin's title as "ilkhan".)
- More recently, the tribal chief that heads both branches of the Bakhtiari people, under whom several khans operate (20th century CE).

In the context of the Hulaguid dynasty, commonly known as the Ilkhanate, the title Ilkhan was borne by the descendants of Hulagu and later other Borjigin princes in Persia, starting from c. 1259–1265. Two interpretations have been proposed:

- 'submissive', 'peaceable', 'obedient', or 'subservient' khan, or 'polity prince'. Possibly equivalent to Chinese kuo-wang, and to Islamic sultan. Here the lesser "khanship" intended to indicate the initial deference of Hulagu to Möngke Khan and his successor Great Khans of the Mongol Empire.
- Sovereign khan. From ilig khan. It was possibly equivalent to Chinese zhenming huangdi ('Emperor with a genuine mandate'). It was to be construed as a power over regional affairs, not in opposition to the Great Khan, yet not conferred by him.

The title of Il Khan was used consistently only in the first half of the dynasty, and after the reign of Geikhatu it was rarely used, with the titles Padishah or Sultan being used instead.

== In fiction ==
- In BattleTech, the IlKhan is the highest leader of The Clans.

== See also ==
- Elbasy ('Head of the Nation')
