= Abu Ishaq Inju =

Abu Ishaq Inju ابو اسحاق اینجو
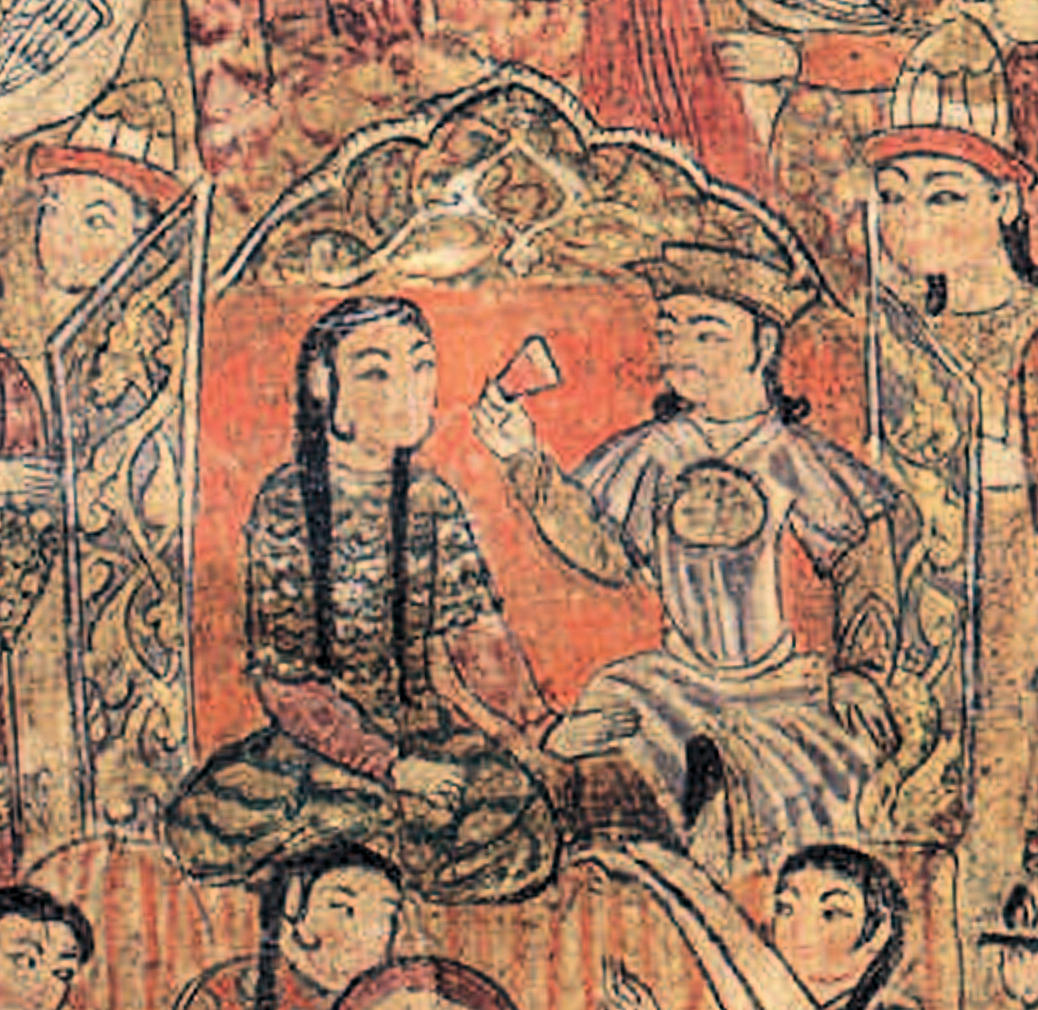
- Likely contemporary depiction of Abu Ishaq and his queen. Frontispiece of the Shahnama of 1352-53. Shiraz, Injuid period.

Amir of the Injuids
- Reign: 1343–1357
- Predecessor: Amir Jalal al-Din Mas'ud Shah
- Successor: Mubariz al-Din Muhammad (Muzaffarids)
- Died: May 1358; Shiraz
- Father: Sharaf al-Din Mahmud Shah
- Religion: Sunni Islam
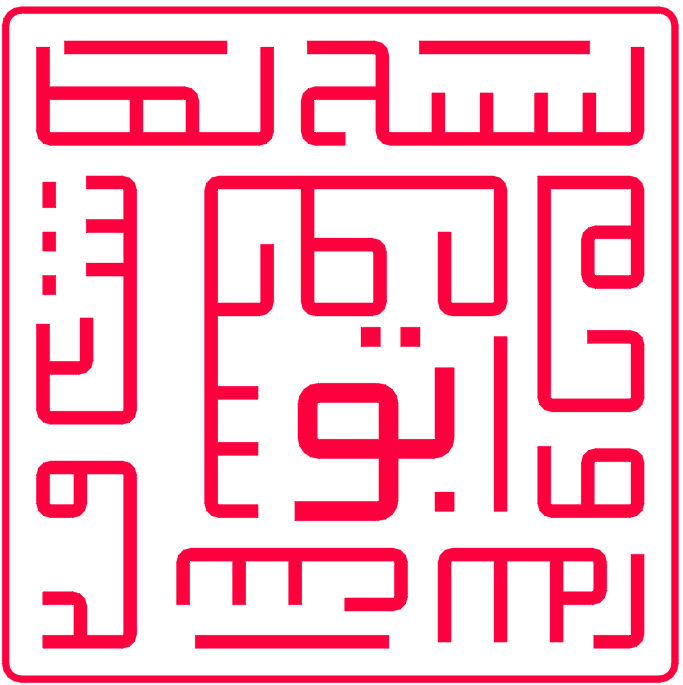
- Seal

Abu Ishaq Inju, or Abū Esḥāq (1321–58, Persian: ابو اسحاق اینجو) was the last Injuid ruler from 1343 to 1357. He was the youngest of four sons of Šaraf-al-dīn Maḥmūd Shah b. Moḥammad Īnǰū, who had been the governor of Fārs for the last Mongol Il-khan, Sultan Abu Sa'id, until the latter's death in 1335.

== Background ==
Following Abu Sa'id's death in 1335, Ilkhanid power disintegrated. An intense seven-year conflict (1335–1342) erupted for the control of southern Iran, between the Chupanids from Tabriz, the Jalayirids of Baghdad, the Muzaffarids of Yazd and the Inju family. The father of Abu Ishaq Inju and all his elder brothers were killed in the conflict.

The Chupanid Amir Pir Husayn Chubani, whose nominal ruler was the new Il-Khan Suleiman Khan, gained suzerainty over Fārs and Isfahan. Isfahan was administered by an Ilkhanid Governor in the person of Sultanshah Jandar.

Meanwhile, Shiraz was being held by the Injuids Amir Ghiyas al-Din Kai-Khusrau (1336–1338/9) and Amir Jalal al-Din Mas'ud Shah.

== Governor of Isfahan and Shiraz (1341-1342) ==
Pir Husayn Chubani captured the city of Shiraz in 1340, which the assistance of Mohammad Mozaffar, whom he rewarded with the Governorship the region of Kerman. Pīr Ḥosayn installed the young Abū Esḥāq as the new Governor of Isfahan in 742 (1341–1342), in replacement of Sultanshah Jandar, as a buffer against the Mozaffarids. Abū Esḥāq governed the city Ispahan for less than two years.

== Independent ruler (1343-1557) ==
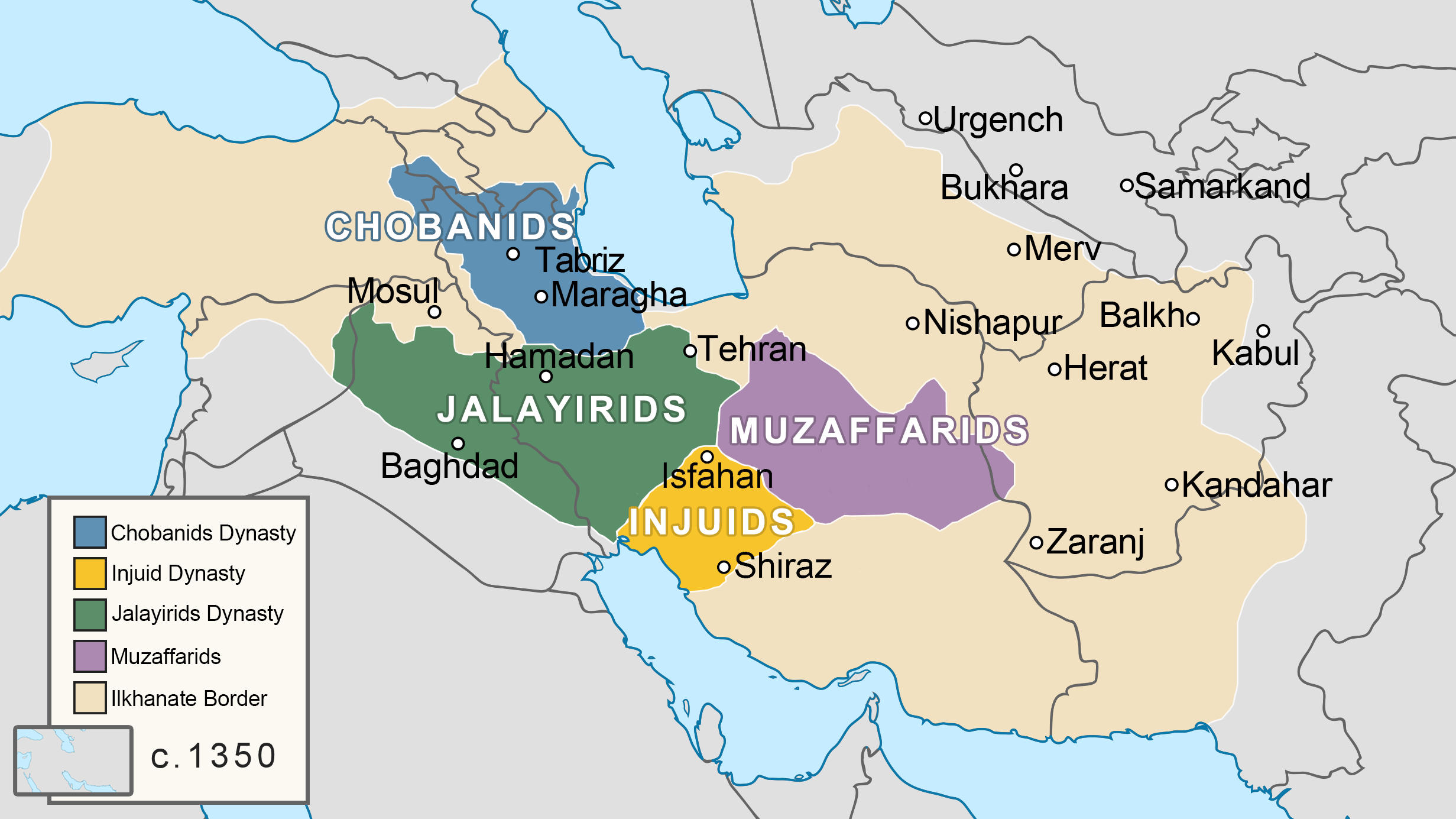
Persian polities circa 1350

Abū Esḥāq finally conspired against Pir Husayn Chubani, and allied with the Chubanid Malek Ashraf, defeating Pir Husayn Chubani at Isfahan in 1342. Pir Husayn Chubani fled to Tabriz, where he was assassinated by the Chubanid ruler Hasan Kuchak. After the assassination of Pir Husayn Chubani in 1342, Abu Esḥāq Inju established his capital in Shiraz, repulsing a final Chubanid contender, Yagi Basti. The death of the Chubanid ruler Hasan Kuchak in 1343 put an end to Chubanid ambitions in the region.

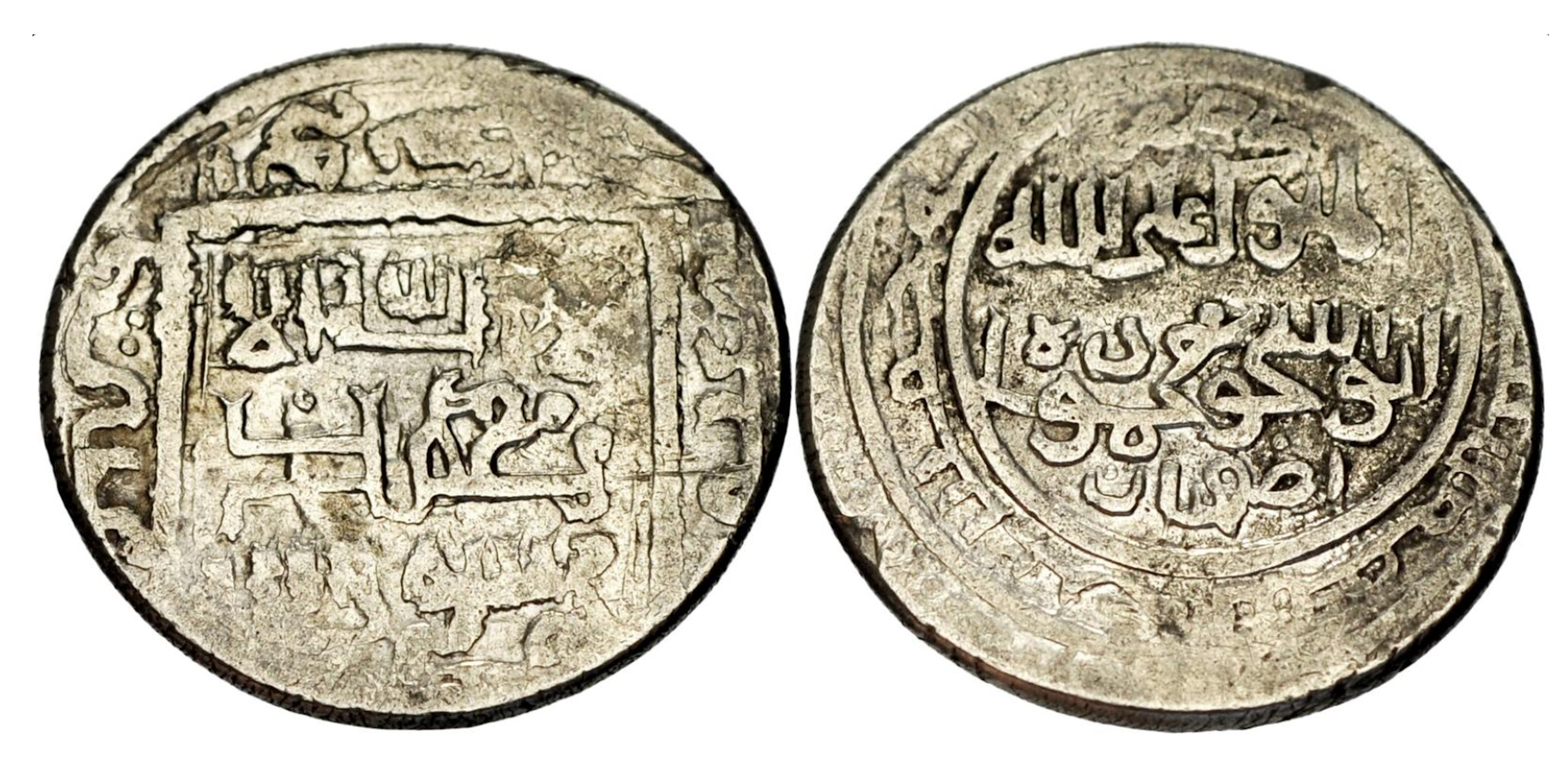
Coinage of Jamal al-Din Abu Ishaq. Isfahan mint. AH 750 (AD 1349–50).

Abū Esḥāq then held sole power in Shiraz, Isfahan, and Lorestān for about twelve years, from 1343 to 1356. Abu Ishaq Inju issued coinage in his name in Isfahan in 1349–1350.

Abū Esḥāq repeatedly attacked his eastern neighbour, the Muzaffarid Mohammad Mozaffar between 1345 and 1352, possibly with the intention of reclaiming the Kerman region, which had been governed by his father.

Abu Ishaq Inju was finally supplanted by Amir Mubariz al-Din Muhammad in 1356, when the latter managed to counter-attack and capture Shiraz. Abū Esḥāq fled to Isfahan, but was captured in 758/1357 by Mubariz al-Din Muhammad and executed. These events put an end to the dynasty of the Injuids in 1357.

== Shiraz under Abu Ishaq Inju ==
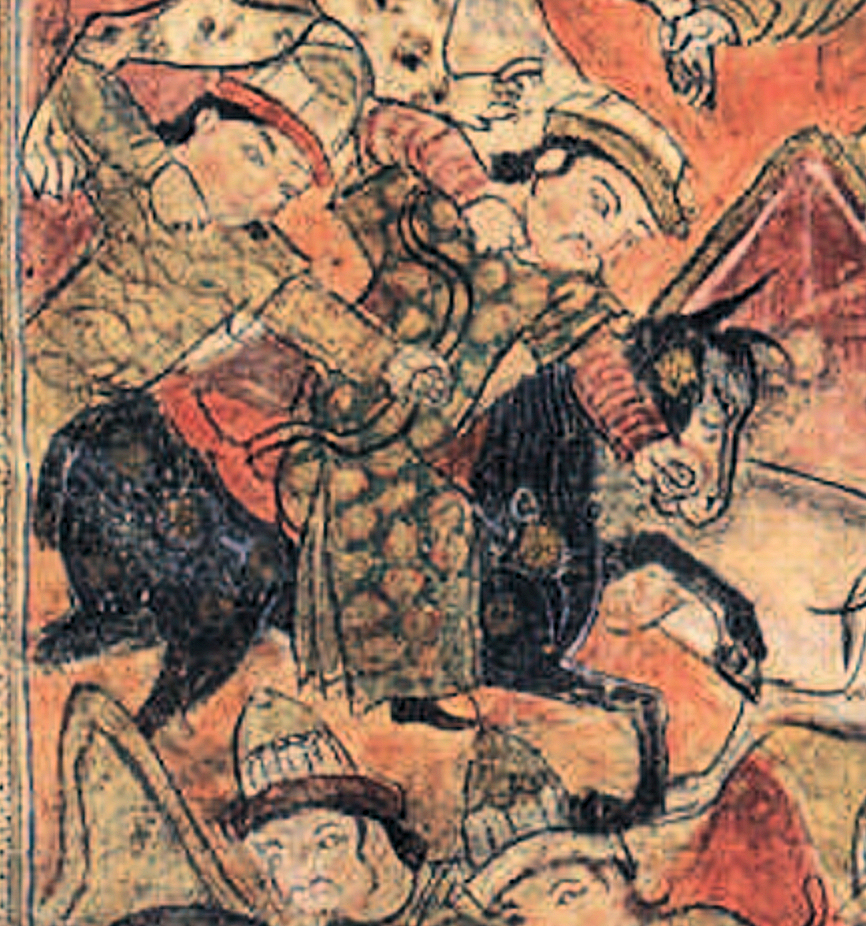
King Abu Ishaq hunting. Firdawsī, Stephens Shāhnāma frontispiece. Probably Shiraz, 1352–53.

During the reign of Abu Ishaq Inju the city of Shiraz flourished, consisting of prominent figures such as Hafez, Khwaju Kermani and Ubayd Zakani.

In Shiraz, Abu Ishaq reportedly had a building constructed that reflected the Sasanian palace Taq-e Kasra at Ctesiphon. However, the construction was never finished and no remains of the building stand today.

== Sources ==
- de Bruijn, J.T.P. (2012). "ʿUbayd-I Zākānī". In Fleet, Kate; Krämer, Gudrun; Matringe, Denis; Nawas, John; Rowson, Everett (eds.). Encyclopaedia of Islam (3rd ed.). Brill Online. ISSN 1873-9830.
- Haidari, A. A. (1986). "A Medieval Persian Satirist". Bulletin of the School of Oriental and African Studies. 49 (1). University of London: 117–127. doi:10.1017/S0041977X00042531. JSTOR 617673. S2CID 193216638. (registration required)
- Khorramshahi, Baha'-al-Din (2002). "Hafez ii. Hafez's life and times". Encyclopaedia Iranica, Vol. XI, Fasc. 5. pp. 465–469.
- Limbert, J. W. (1983). "Abū Esḥāq Īnǰū". Encyclopaedia Iranica, Vol. I, Fasc. 3. pp. 273–274.
- Limbert, John (2004). Shiraz in the Age of Hafez. University of Washington Press. pp. 1–182. ISBN 9780295802886.
- Meneghini, Daniela (2008). "ʿObayd Zākāni". Encyclopaedia Iranica.
- Wing, Patrick (2014). "Mozaffarids". Encyclopaedia Iranica.

Preceded by Amir Jalal al-Din Mas'ud Shah	Amir of the Injuids; 1343–1357	Succeeded by Mubariz al-Din Muhammad (Muzaffarids)
