= Ubayd Zakani =

14th-century Persian poet and satirist

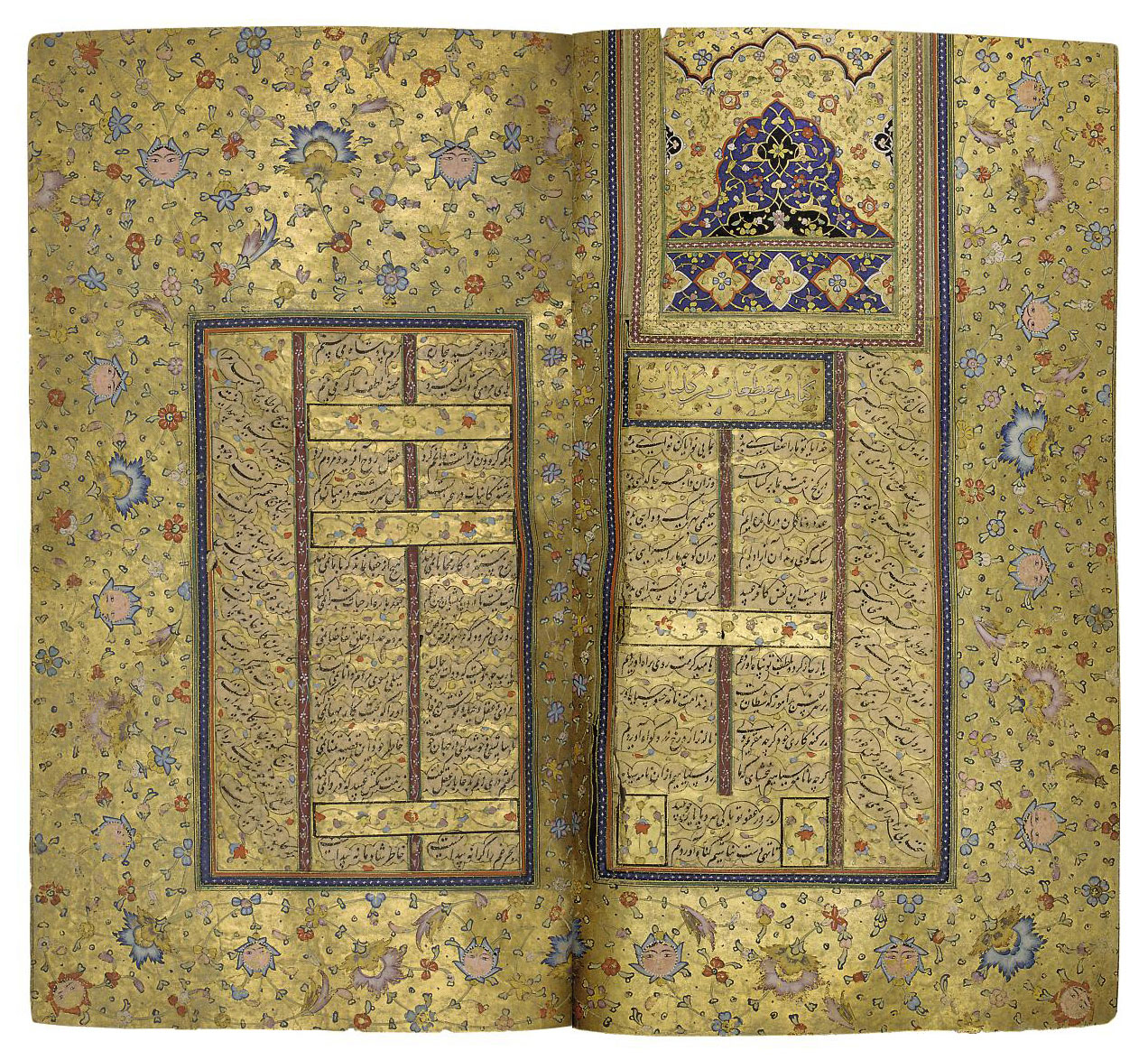
- A compilation of works by Ubayd Zakani and Fakhr al-Din Bushaq-e a'tima (died 1420). From a manuscript of Safavid Iran, dated April/May 1540.
- Born: before 1319; Qazvin, Ilkhanate
- Died: 1369–1371 possibly Shiraz, Muzaffarid kingdom
- Occupations: Poet, satirist
- Writing career
- Notable work: Mush-o Gorbeh

Khwajeh Nizam al-Din Ubayd Allah al-Zakani (Persian: خواجه نظام الدین عبید الله الزاکانی, romanized: Xwāja Niẓām al-Dīn ʿUbayd Allāh al-Zākānī; d. 1370), better known as Ubayd Zakani (Persian: عبید زاکانی, romanized: ʿUbayd-I Zākānī), was a poet of the Mongol era, regarded as one of the best satirists in Persian literature. His most famous work is Mush-o Gorbeh ("Mouse and Cat"), a political satire which attacks religious hypocrisy. Although a highly popular figure in his own time, Ubayd's work received little attention from modern scholars until recently, due to provocative and bawdy texts in the majority of his works. His style of satire has been compared to the French Enlightenment writer Voltaire (d. 1778).

== Background ==
Ubayd was from the Zakani family, which was descended from the Banu Khafaja, an Arab tribe that had immigrated to Qazvin in northern Iran at the start of the Islamic era. The Zakani family was made up of two branches; one being notable for its field in religion, while the other, to which Ubayd belonged, consisted of landowners and bureaucrats. Ubayd himself was born in Qazvin, most likely before 1319. Iran was then under Mongol (Ilkhanate) rule, widely considered to be the golden age of Persian poetry.

== Life ==
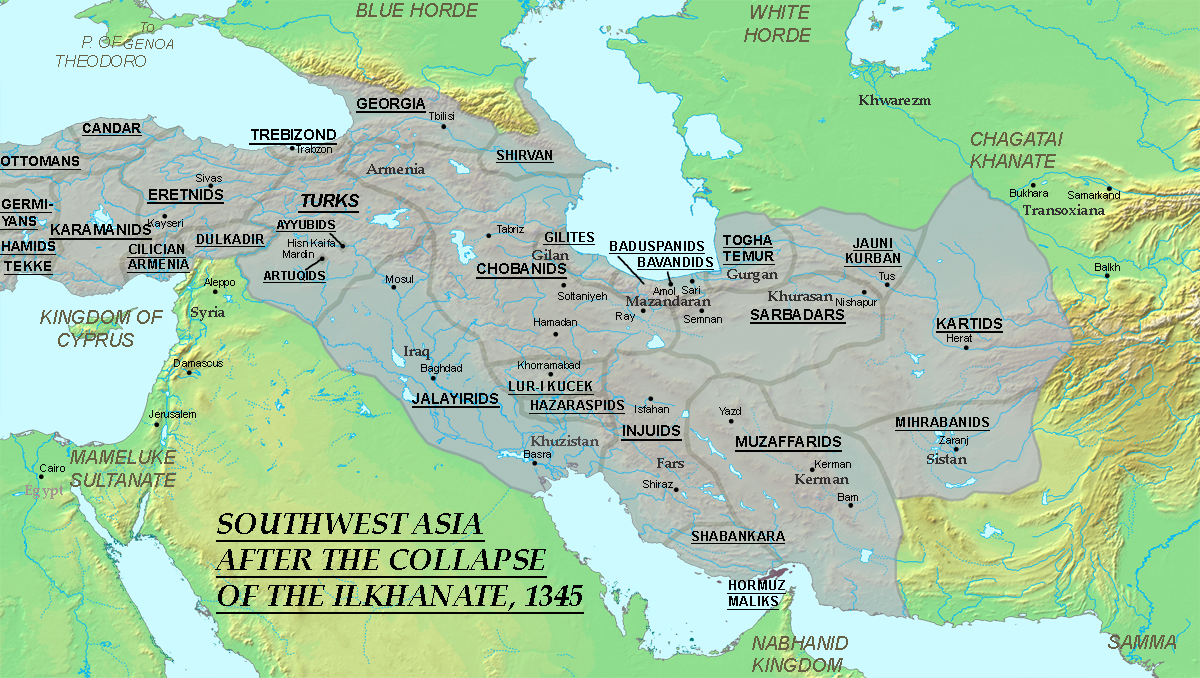
Map showing the political situation in the Iranian plateau in 1345, ten years after the fall of the Ilkhanate

The contemporary Persian writer Hamdallah Mustawfi, who was a fellow Qazvini, describes Ubayd in his Tarikh-i guzida (1329) as a gifted poet and a well-educated writer. This comment was made in the same year as the composition of Nawādir al-amṯāl, one of Ubayd's first works. The book, written in Arabic, was a compilation of proverbs of prophets and sages. After the fall of the Ilkhanate in 1335, Ubayd fled to Shiraz in Fars, then under Injuid control. There he joined the court of the Injuid ruler Abu Ishaq Inju (r. 1343–1357), to whom he wrote a considerable segment of his panegyrics, and also his acclaimed Ushshaq-nama (1350), a masnavi mixed with ghazals. Ubayd also dedicated some of his poems to Abu Ishaq Inju's minister Rukn al-din Amid al-Mulk.

Ubayd was part of Abu Ishaq Inju's circle of poets, which included an elder Khwaju Kermani and a young Hafez. However, in 1357, the Muzaffarid ruler Mubariz al-Din Muhammad (r. 1314–1358) captured Shiraz and had Abu Ishaq Inju executed. Ubayd was consequently forced to leave Shiraz, most likely leaving for the domains of the Jalayirid ruler Shaykh Uways Jalayir (r. 1356–1374), to whom he dedicated qasidas. Ubayd also wrote an elegy for the deceased Abu Ishaq Inju, who had been his most important patron. He later returned to Shiraz during the reign of Mubariz al-Din Muhammad's son and successor Shah Shoja Mozaffari (r. 1358–1384), to whom he dedicated several panegyrics. Ubayd had little love for his hometown Qazvin, preferring Shiraz instead. He died sometime between 1369 and 1371, possibly in Shiraz.

== Literary work ==
Most of Ubayd's work is in Persian, although some of it is in Arabic as well, demonstrating his high education. His satire is generally divided into three topics: religion, politics, and ethics. In regards to religion, he criticizes the clergy for their hypocrisy, such as meddling in other people's lives and especially hijacking the right to reprehend freethinkers. Ubayd's most famous work is Mush-o Gorbeh ("Mouse and Cat"), a political satire which attacks religious hypocrisy. The work was considered risky, due to being made during a time when one could face death for criticizing religious leaders. Unlike Hafez, Ubayd generally distanced himself from the fused mystical-lyrical tradition of poetry, focusing on satires instead.

== Legacy ==
Ubayd is regarded as one of the best satirists in Persian literature. His work has been compared to that of the 18th-century French Enlightenment writer Voltaire. According to the British orientalist Edward Granville Browne, Ubayd was "perhaps the most remarkable parodist and satirical writer produced by Persia." Ubayd and Iraj Mirza (d. 1926) are considered the most illustrious Iranian satirists.

== Sources ==
- de Bruijn, J.T.P. (2002). "ʿUbayd-I Zākānī". The Encyclopaedia of Islam, Second Edition (12 vols.). Leiden: E. J. Brill.
- Haidari, A. A. (1986). "A Medieval Persian Satirist". Bulletin of the School of Oriental and African Studies. 49 (1). University of London: 117–127. doi:10.1017/S0041977X00042531. JSTOR 617673. S2CID 193216638. (registration required)
- Khorramshahi, Baha'-al-Din (2002). "Hafez ii. Hafez's life and times". Encyclopaedia Iranica, Vol. XI, Fasc. 5. pp. 465–469.
- Kowsar, Nikahang (2012). Being Funny Is Not that Funny: Contemporary Editorial Cartooning in Iran. Vol. 79. Johns Hopkins University Press. pp. 117–144.
- Limbert, John (2004). Shiraz in the Age of Hafez. University of Washington Press. pp. 1–182. ISBN 978-0-295-80288-6.
- Meneghini, Daniela (2008). "ʿObayd Zākāni". Encyclopaedia Iranica.
- Wing, Patrick (2014). "Mozaffarids". Encyclopaedia Iranica.
