= Fali-Sirafis =

The Fali-Sirafis were a local Iranian family based in Shiraz, who occupied an important position in the city under the Salghurids (1148–1282), Ilkhanate (1256–1335), and Injuids (1335–1357).

They were either descended from the old Iranian Zoroastrian dehqans (landed aristocrats) of Fars or from Daylamite immigrants who settled in Fars during the Buyid era. The first known member of the family is Qazi Saraj al-Din Abu al-Ezz Mokarram ibn Ala Fali (died 1224), who served as the chief judge of Fars and khatib of the New Mosque in Shiraz.

The family lost much of its power following the Muzaffarid capture of Shiraz and the death of Majd al-Din Esma'il Fali, in 1353 and 1355 respectively. Regardless, they continued to be influential under the Muzaffarids. Prominent members of the Fali-Sirafis are recorded as far as 1972.

== Sources ==
- Limbert, John (2004). Shiraz in the Age of Hafez. University of Washington Press. ISBN 978-0295983912.
