= Pir Husayn Chubani =

Chobanid Amir of Fars in 1339–42

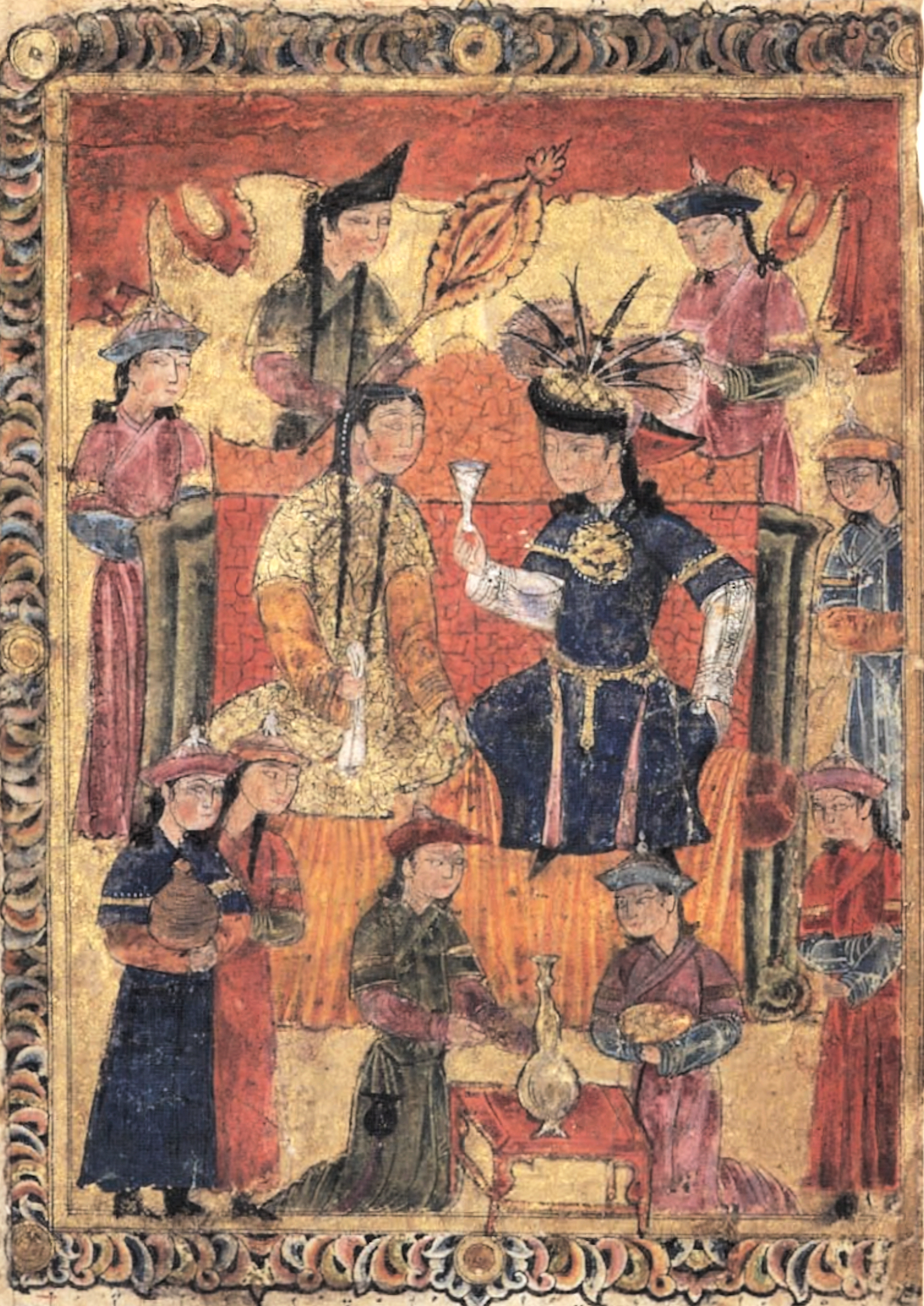
A contemporary princely scene from Isfahan, during the last period of Chobanid control. Mu'nis al-ahrar Frontipiece, Isfahan, 1341.

Pir Husayn Chubani (Amīr Pīr Ḥusayn b. Shaykh Maḥmūd b. Chopān) was a Chobanid Amir and governor of the region of Fars from 1339 to 1342. He was one of the four sons of Shaikh Mahmoud, who had been Chobanid Governor of Armenia and Georgia until 1327, himself son of Chupan.

== Governorship of Fars and Isfahan (1339–1342) ==
Following Abu Sa'id's death in 1335, Ilkhanid power disintegrated. Pir Husayn Chubani was appointed by the puppet Ilkhanid ruler Suleiman Khan (r. 1339–1343) as the suzerain of southern Iran, particularly the Fars and Isfahan regions. The Chobanids firmly controlled Isfahan at that time, and would remain in place until the takeover of the city by the Injuid Abu Ishaq Inju in 1342.

In 740/1339–40, Pīr Ḥusayn jointly ruled Shiraz with Jalāl al-Dīn Masʿūd Shāh, who remained highly popular with the local population, and they issued anonymous gold dinars together. Pir Husayn Chubani was once ejected from Fars, but was able to retake control of the region in 1340, after a Chobanid victory against the Jalayirids near Maraga on 26 June 1340. He recaptured Shiraz in November/December 1340. He did so with the help of the Muzaffarid Mubariz al-Din Muhammad, whom he rewarded by giving him the Governorship of Kerman.

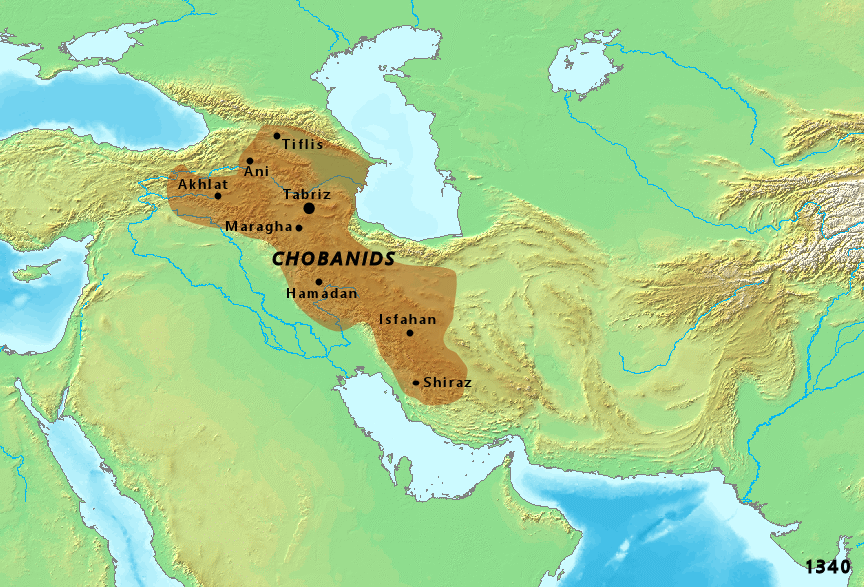
Map of the Chobanids (maximum extent, circa 1340)

In Isfahan in 1341–1342, Pir Husayn Chubani replaced the Ilkhanid Sultanshah Jandar with Shaykh Abu Ishaq Inju as Governor of Isfahan, and as a buffer against the Mozaffarids. Abū Esḥāq governed the city Ispahan for less than 2 years.

== Rise of Abu Ishaq (1342) ==
Abū Esḥāq finally conspired against Pir Husayn Chubani, and allied with the Chubanid Malek Ashraf, defeating Pir Husayn Chubani at Isfahan in 1342. Pir Husayn Chubani fled to Tabriz, where he was assassinated by the Chubanid ruler Hasan Kuchak. After the assassination of Pir Husayn Chubani in 1342, Abu Esḥāq Inju established his capital in Shiraz, repulsing a final Chubanid contender, Yagi Basti. The death of the Chubanid ruler Hasan Kuchak in 1343 put an end to Chubanid ambitions in the region.

Abu Esḥāq Inju became the undisputed Injuid ruler in the region until 1357.

== See also ==
- Injuids
