= Emamieh school =

Iranian former school and national heritage site

Emamieh Religious School مدرسه امامیه
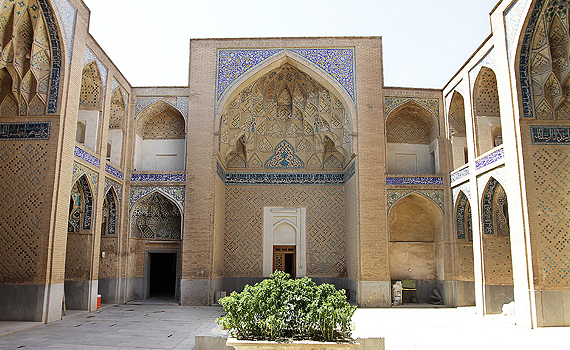

- Location within Iran
- 32°40′23.4″N 51°41′11.1″E
- Location: Isfahan, Iran

Iran National Heritage List
- Official name: Emamieh Religious School
- Type: Religious School
- Designated: 1932
- Reference no.: 114
- Conservation organization: Cultural Heritage, Handicrafts and Tourism Organization of Iran

The Emamieh school, Imamiyeh School, Madrasah-i Imami or Imami Madrasa, is a historical theological college, or madrasa, in Isfahan, Iran.

== Structure ==
It is one of the earliest known madrasas in Iran, its construction being dated to 1325, in the final Ilkhanid period. Its size is 92 by 72 meters. The madrasa consists in a typical Seljuk-type courtyard in baked-brick, with four iwans in the center of each internal side, which have cells for student accommodation. The central space is for prayer and study. Next to it was the tomb of the theologian Baba Qasim, erected by Abu al-Hasan al Talut al Damghani in 1340-41. It was lost in the 19th century, and was rebuilt as part of the madrasa.

From an architectural and stylistic standpoint, the Emamieh school is considered as belonging to the "Ilkhanid era".

== Tiling ==
The building was tiled by the Sheikh Mohammad ebn-e Omar, whose name was mentioned on the inscriptions of the school. The inscription in the courtyard gives a date of 1354–55 CE during the Injuid period, at a time just before the city fell to the Muzaffarids in 1356–57. A remarkable mihrab in mo'araq cut-tile mosaic is attributed to this date, and was recovered from the madrasa: it is now in the Metropolitan Museum of Art in New York. The mihrab is considered as a masterpiece of mo'araq technique, a type of decorative technique started during the Ilkhanid period in the early 14th century in the cities of Sham, Tabriz and Sultaniyya.

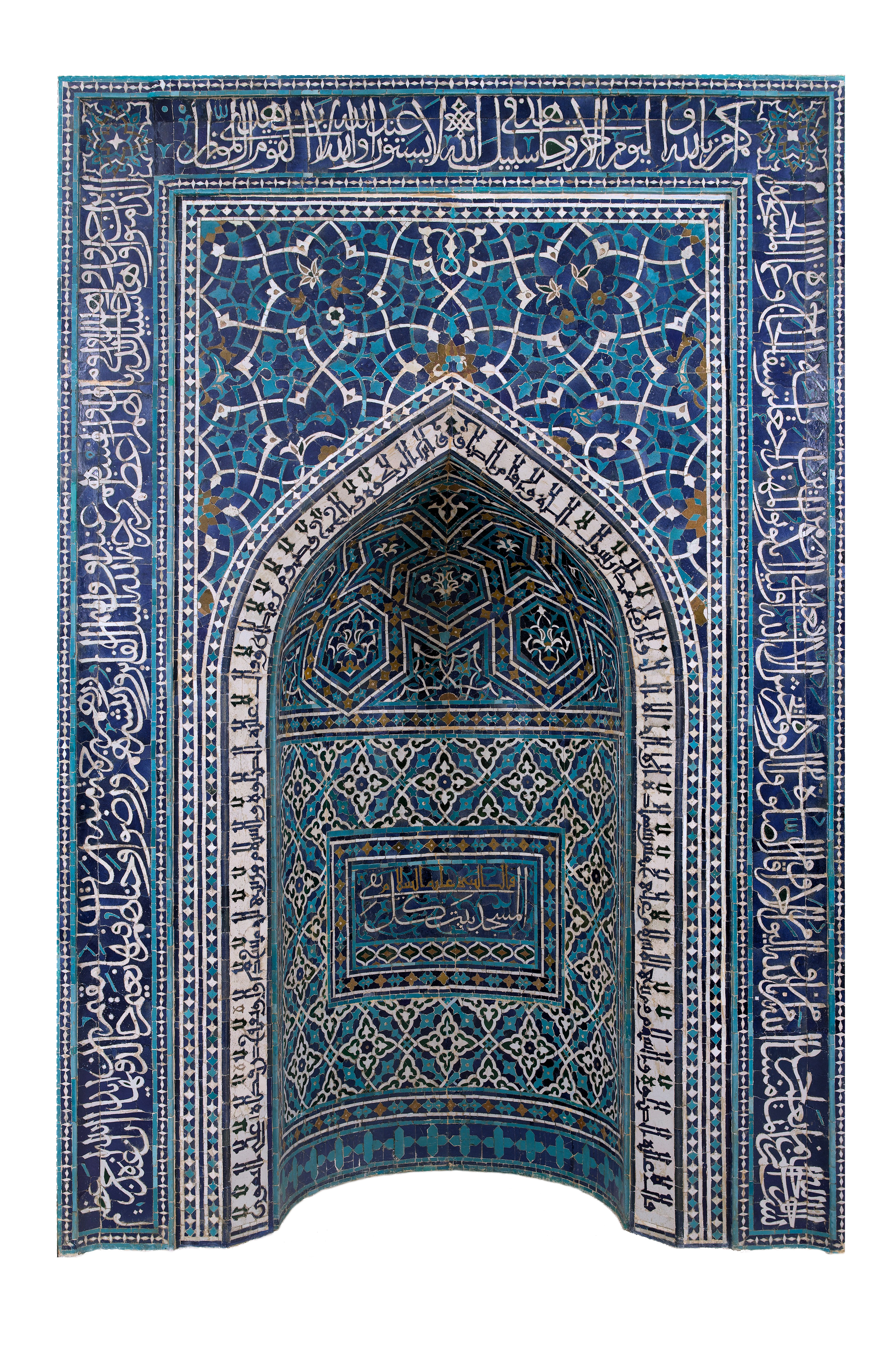
The Mihrab. Metropolitan Museum of Art.

== See also ==
- List of the historical structures in the Isfahan province
