= Samak-e Ayyar =

Ancient Persian folk tale

Samak-e Ayyar (Persian: سمک عیار) is an ancient Persian romantic folklore story.

Samak-e Ayyar was transmitted orally for an unknown time period, then was transcribed around the 12th century. It was published in 1968 in Iran. Samak-e Ayyar belongs to the Persian literary genre of popular romance.

== Plot ==
Samak-e Ayyar is about the prince Khorshid-shāh, the son of Marzbān-shāh. At age 16, Khorshid-shāh falls in love with Mah-pari, princess of the Kingdom of Chin (today part of China). He decides to journey to Chin to join her.

Khorshid-shāh receives help from a group of ʿayyārān "knights-errant" who are followers of javānmardī or futuwwa principles. Samak, the main protagonist, is an ʿayyār who becomes Khorshid-shāh's best friend and helps him on his quest.

The ending of the Samak-e Ayyar has been lost.

== Background ==
The only extant copy of Samak-e Ayyar is an illustrated manuscript preserved in three volumes (Ouseley 379, 380, 381) in the Bodleian Library in Oxford. This manuscript has no colophon, so there is no information about patron and scribe. The manuscript is also missing any note indicating the exact date and place of the codex's creation.

Samak-e Ayyar was originally told by professional storytellers. According to the story's text, Farāmarz ebn Khodādād ebn Kāteb Arrajānī is the compiler and the story's second narrator. He heard the story from a certain Ṣadaqa b. Abi’l-Qāsem Shīrāzī, the first narrator of the story.

Samak-e Ayyar contains many old Persian names, such as Khordasb Shido, Hormozkil, Shāhak, Gilsavār, Mehrooye, and Zarand. The numerous Turkic names imply that the story was not transcribed before the Seljuq period. Its layout, the style of illustrations and the existence of some famous verses indicate that it was created during the early 14th century.

== Publishing history ==
Samak-e Ayyar was edited and published for the first time by Parviz Nātel Khānlari during 1347/1968 and 1353/1974. It was published in five volumes by Sokhan, and later by Āgāh publishing center in Iran.

It is a source of cultural and social information about medieval Persian and followed the structure of stories which belong to the oral tradition.

The manuscript has 80 illustrations; the images are particularly interesting as their artists – in contrast to the illustrators of other texts like the Shāhnāmeh – had no previous example to imitate for the scenes.

In 1936, Ivan Shchukin categorized the images of the manuscript as belonging to the Injuid style, an idea which is still generally accepted.

The first major English-language rendering of these tales, Samak the Ayyar, was translated by Freydoon Rassouli and adapted by Jordan Mechner for Columbia University Press.
