= Malek Ashraf =

Chupanid ruler

Sultan of Chupanids
- Reign: 1343–1357
- Predecessor: Hasan Kuchak
- Successor: Shaykh Uways Jalayir; Bayram Khwaja as Qara Qoyunlu
- Died: 1357; Tabriz, Qara Qoyunlu
- Noble family: Chobanids
- Heir: Temürtas
- Father: Timurtash
- Mother: Daulat Khatun

Malek Ashraf (Persian: ملک اشرف), (fl. 1341–1357) was a Mongol Chupanid ruler of northwestern Iran during the 14th century. He was the last of the Chupanids to possess a significant influence within Ilkhanate. His regnal name was Giyas al-Din Shah Malek Ashraf (Persian: غیاث الدین شاه ملكك شرف, romanized: Ghiyāth al-Dīn Shāh Malik Ashraf).

== Early years ==
He was the second son of Timurtash and his wife Daulat Khatun, born sometime after Hasan Kuchak. He was imprisoned with his brothers in Karahisar by Abu Sa'id after their father's execution.

Malek Ashraf distinguished himself while serving under his brother Hasan Kuchak, defeating an army of Khurasan sent by Togha Temur against Hasan in 1341. He then became embroiled in the conflict with the Injuids over Shiraz. Malek Ashraf received a request for assistance by the Injuid Abu Ishaq against his cousin Pir Hosayn, following which Malek defeated Pir Hosayn in August 1342, allowing Abu Ishaq to temporarily regain control of Shiraz.

== De facto reign ==
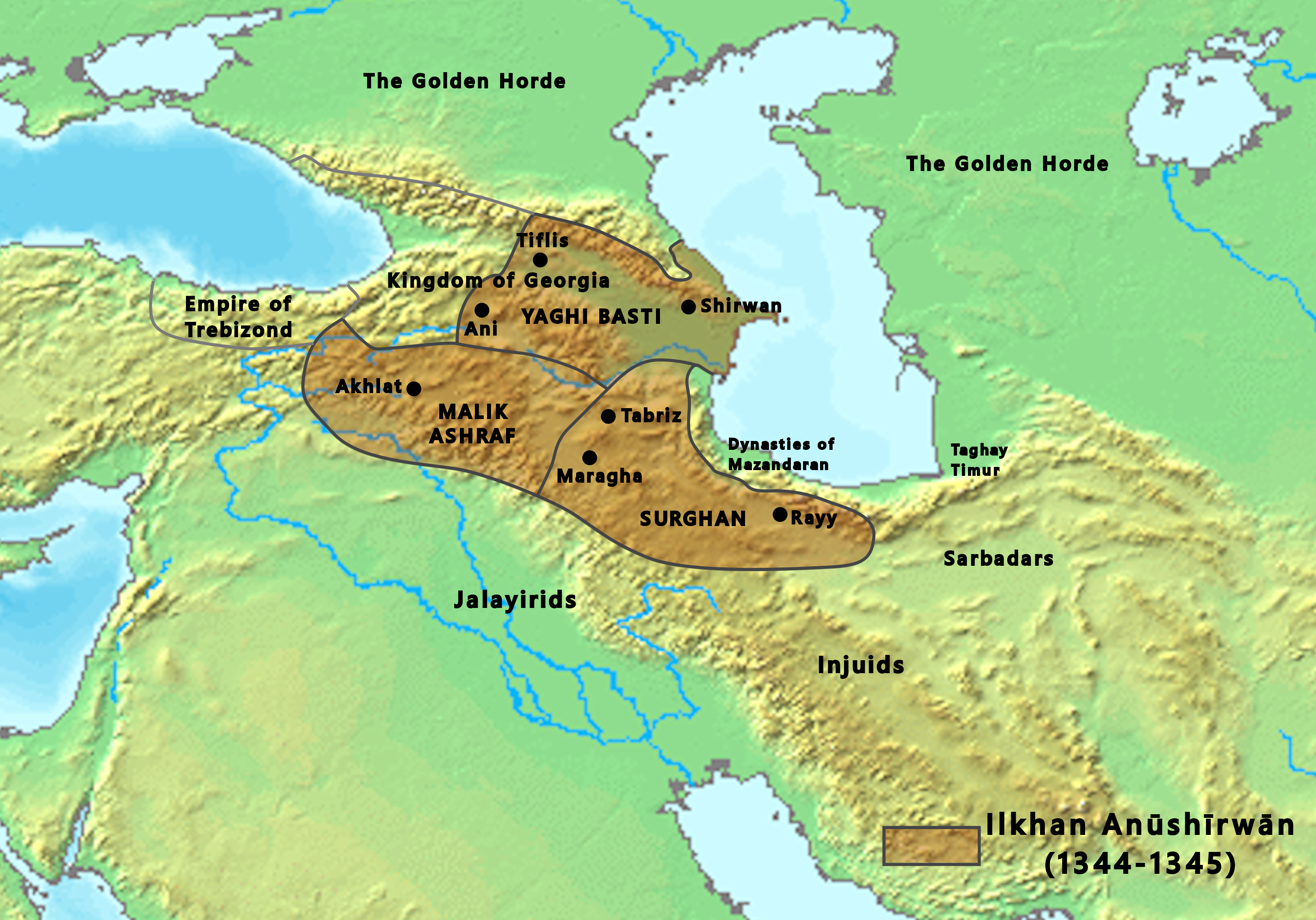
Division of Anūshīrwān’s domains among the Chopanids, according to the agreement of 745 (1344–5).

Upon the death of Hasan Kuchak in 1343, the Chobanid lands were at first split between Malek and his uncles Yagi Basti and Surgan. However, the division did not last, and Malek defeated Surgan in battle. After having Yagi Basti murdered in 1344, he sent envoys to Kayqubad I of Shirvan in order to secure a marriage alliance, however he refused. Malek had to return to Kurdistan to fight Surgan in 1345. He then accused Suleiman Khan, former puppet khan, of murdering Hasan. Suleiman amassed a part of Hasan Kuchak's treasury as well and appealed to Hasan Buzurg to intervene, who escorted him to Tabriz. Malek Ashraf raised another puppet named Anushirwan as new Ilkhan in Arran and rode to Tabriz in 1346. He appointed 'Abd al-Hayy Hammami Tabrizi as his vizier as well.

During his time as ruler, Malek became increasingly paranoid, violent and quickly grew unpopular with many of his subjects. Executed his younger brother Misr Malek alongside Aliki Bahadur, viceroy of Nakhchivan. Malek later sent his younger brother, Malek Ashtar, to capture Baghdad in the first half of 1347, but the campaign failed with heavy losses. He even turned on his favorite vizier 'Abd al-Hayy and seized 300.000 dinars from him by force. In 1350 he also attempted to wrest Fars from the Injuids at the request of Mozaffarids, but failed to take Isfahan and was forced to settle for tribute.

== Downfall ==
His cruelty combined with the spread of the bubonic plague in the region, prompted many citizens to leave the area. In 1357, he raised a new obscure puppet Ilkhan to the throne, Ghazan II. However, this was interrupted by Jani Beg of the Golden Horde who invaded in 1357 through Shirvan. Jani Beg's letter of demanding submission was replied by Malek who said "he is merely an emir under Ghazan". Malek tried fleeing to Anatolia, but had to fight near Sarab and lost 2000-3000 men in battle. Malek himself fled to Marand, but was captured near Khoy. He was captured hung in Tabriz, to the joy of the local populace. Malek's mother and children were taken by Jani Beg upon his departure from the region.

== Family ==
His only son Temürtas was killed by Hasan Buzurg's successor Shaikh Uvais in 1360, while his daughter Soltanbakht was mentioned as having been in Shiraz.

== Sources ==
- al-Kutbi, Abu Bakr (1954), van Loon, J.B. (ed.), Tarikh-i Shaikh Uwais, Gravenhage

Malek Ashraf Died: 1357
Preceded by Hassan Kuchak	Head of the Chobanids; 1343–1357	Succeeded by None
