= Hasan Kuchak =

Prince

Supreme commander of Il-Khanate (Claimed)
- Tenure: 1338–1343
- Predecessor: Hasan Buzurg
- Successor: Malek Ashraf
- Born: c. 1319; Kayseri, Viceroyalty of Anatolia, Ilkhanate
- Died: December 15, 1343 (aged 23–24); Tabriz, Ilkhanate
- Noble family: Chobanids
- Spouse: Izzat Malik
- Father: Timurtash
- Mother: Daulat Khatun

Hasan Kuchak or Ḥasan-i Kūchik (Persian: حسن كوچك; c. 1319 – 15 December 1343) was a Chupanid prince during the 14th century. He is credited with setting up a nearly independent Chupanid state in Iran during the struggles taking place in the aftermath of the Ilkhanate. He effectively became kingmaker like his namesake Hasan Buzurg.

== Early life ==
He was born c. 1319 to Timurtash and his wife Daulat Khatun during his viceroyalty in Anatolia. However Hasan's father was executed by the Mamelukes in 1328, forcing Hasan to go into hiding from his father's rivals for a while. Hasan's rise to power began three years after the death of the last powerful Ilkhan, Abu Sa'id. The Jalayirids under Hasan Buzurg had recently mastered western Persia, putting a puppet Muhammad Khan on the Ilkhanid throne in 1336. Hasan attempted to unify the fragmented Chobanid family. Claiming his father was alive, he used a slave named Qara Jari (a possible offspring of Hasan's grandfather Chupan) to impersonate him. The widows of Timurtash Daulat and Kalturmish were even married to him. Mameluk Sultan Al-Nasr Muhammad, who had ordered Timurtash's execution, attempted to expose the fraud, but without much success. The Chobanids rallied to him; several of them (such as his cousin Pir Hosayn – governor of Tabriz) defected from Hasan Buzurg's service. Hasan Buzurg's ally Eretna could not do much to stop him when he and his brothers moved from Karahisar to the east of Anatolia.

Together, they defeated Hasan Buzurg in Alataq area near Van on July 16, 1338. Muhammad Khan was executed, and the region around Tabriz occupied. Hasan Kuchak became the de facto leader of Ilkhanate realm when he was just 19.

== De facto reign ==
At this point, Qara Jari attempted to get rid of Hasan Kuchak and take power for himself, but fled when the effort failed, ultimately killed by Hasan Buzurg. Following this, Hasan raised Sati Beg, sister of Abu Sa'id and widow of Chupan, to the Ilkhanid throne in the summer of 1338.

When Togha Temur, another claimant to the throne, invaded from Khurasan in the winter of 1339 at the behest of Hasan Buzurg, the Chobanid offered Sati's hand to him in marriage. Using this to receive letters of assurance from Togha Temur, Hasan Kuchak forwarded these to the Jalayirids. Hasan Buzurg, feeling betrayed, stopped his advance in support of Togha, and the latter was forced to retreat in July 1339. As a result of Jahan Temür's being raised to throne by Buzurg, Kuchak found a new suitable male puppet in the form of Suleiman Khan, whom he forced Sati Beg to marry in May 1339. Hasan decided to march against the Jalayirids again. Supported by Pir Hosayn, as well as his uncle Surgan, he defeated the Jalayirids on June 26, 1340, in the Zarrinarüd valley near Maraga. Surgan was made governor of Iraq and Pir Hosayn was sent to Fars.

=== Revolt of Surgan ===
However, not all of the Chobanids remained loyal. Surgan, unhappy with the treatment of his mother Sati Beg, defected to Hasan Buzurg. An alliance was formed between the two, soon joined by the Sutayid ruler of Diyarbakr Hajji Taghay, as well as Mameluk Sultan Al-Nasr. Hasan Kuchak, however, managed to lure him out of the alliance, and the Mameluks soon abandoned their support. Still, Surgan began to plot with Togha Temur, who sent his brother Amir Shaikh 'Ali Ka'un to invade Iraq. These forces were defeated by Hasan Kuchak's brother Malek Asraf in the latter half of 1341, and Surgan was soon imprisoned and sent to Karahisar in deep Anatolia.

=== Revolt of Yagi Basti ===
Around the same time, several of the Chobanids became embroiled in a conflict concerning Fars. Malek Ashraf, along with his cousin Pir Hosayn and his uncle Yagi Basti, were involved in a conflict that also included the Injuids, the owners of the area, and the Jalayirids. The conflict split the Chobanids, and Pir Hosayn was arrested and poisoned in Tabriz in 1342. Yagi Basti and Malek Asraf met up in Baghdad; realizing the danger of the two individuals, Hasan Kuchak caused Malek Asraf to flee to Georgia, and then convinced Hasan Buzurg to abandon his support for him. Still, the two were back in Fars in the following year.

== Death and aftermath ==
Hasan Kuchak was married to Izzat Malik, a daughter of Hajji Jabash (son of Sunjaq Noyan). He was murdered by her near the end of 1343, ostensibly because she feared that her marital infidelity would be discovered. As Hasan Kuchak left no successor, Malek Asraf and Yagi Basti, along with Surgan, split the Chobanid lands, though Malek eventually became sole ruler. He was buried in Tabriz.

== Legacy ==
His name survives on an inscription found in Tabriz, Ostād-Šāgerd mosque which was built during reign of Suleiman Khan.

== Sources ==
- Julian Raby; Teresa Fitzherbert; University of Oxford. Faculty of Oriental Studies (1996). The court of the Il-khans, 1290-1340. Pub. by the Oxford University Press for the Board of the Faculty of Oriental Studies, University of Oxford. ISBN 978-0-19-728022-5.
- Papers on Inner Asia. Vol. 30. Indiana University, Research Institute for Inner Asian Studies. 1999. p. 3.
- Bruno De Nicola; Charles Melville (2016). The Mongols' Middle East: Continuity and Transformation in Ilkhanid Iran. BRILL. p. 324. ISBN 978-90-04-31472-6.
- Melville, Charles; Zaryāb, ʿAbbās (1991). "CHOBANIDS". Encyclopaedia Iranica, Vol. V, Fasc. 5. pp. 496–502.

Hasan Kuchak Born: 1319 Died: 1343
Preceded by Timurtash	Head of the Chobanids; 1338–1343	Succeeded by Malek Ashraf
