= Chobanids =

Country in West Asia (1338–1357)

Chobanids چوپانیان
- 1338–1357
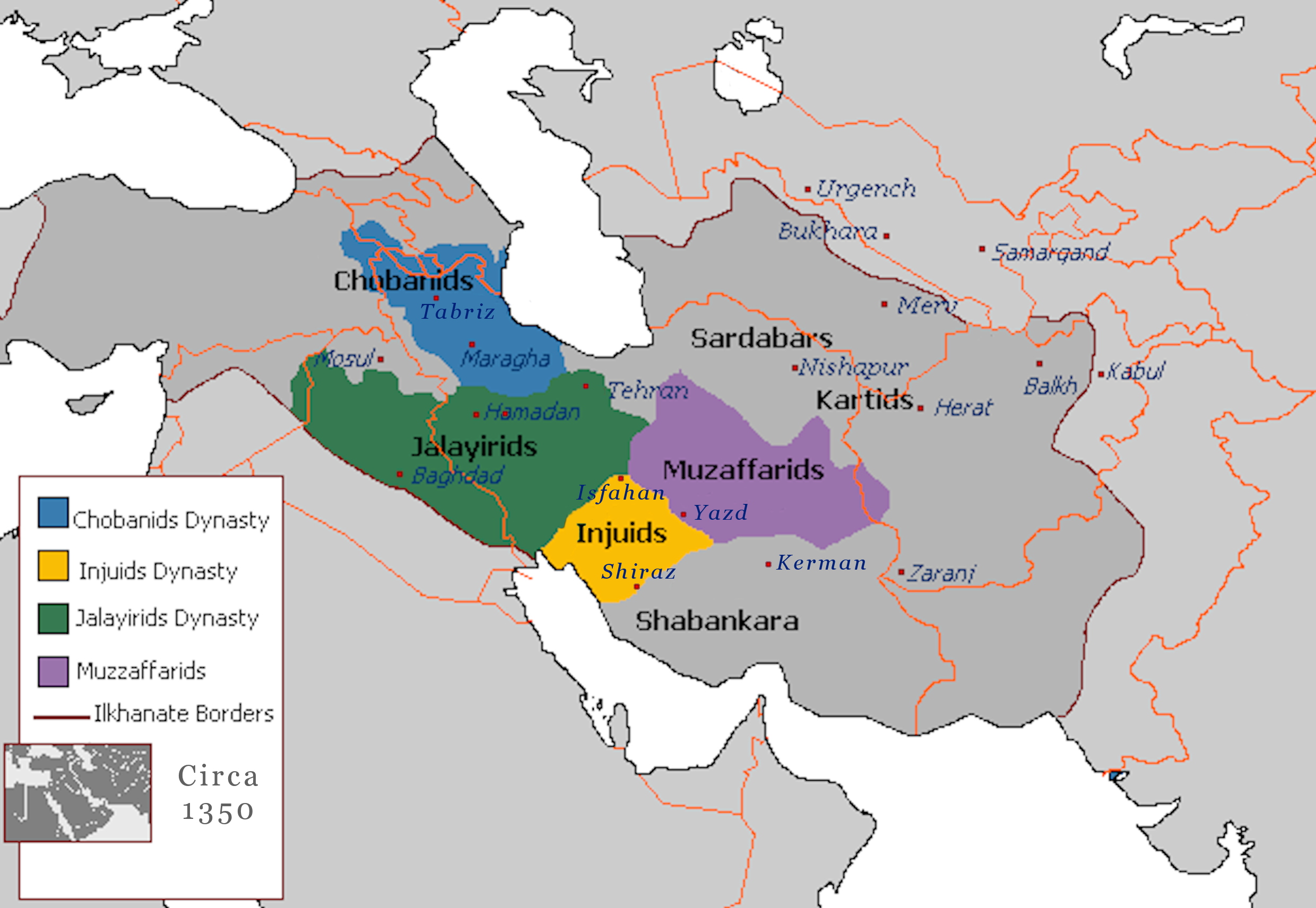
- Territory of the Chobadnids ■ and division of Ilkhanate territory, circa 1350, including the Jalayirids ■, the Injuids ■ and the Muzaffarids ■
- Capital: Tabriz
- Common languages: Persian, Mongolian
- Government: Monarchy
- History
  - Established: 1338
  - Disestablished: 1357
Preceded by	Succeeded by
Ilkhanate	Golden Horde; Jalayirids

The Chobanids or the Chupanids (Persian: چوپانیان) were descendants of a Mongol family of the Suldus clan that came to prominence in 14th century Persia. At first serving under the Ilkhans, they took de facto control of the territory after the fall of the Ilkhanate. The Chobanids ruled over Azerbaijan (where they were based), Arrān, parts of Asia Minor, Mesopotamia, and west central Persia, while the Jalayirids took control in Baghdad.

== Amir Chupan and his sons ==
During the early 14th century, Amir Chupan served under three successive Ilkhans, beginning with Ghazan Mahmud. A military commander of note, Chupan quickly gained a degree of influence over the Ilkhans and married several members of the line of Hulagu Khan. His power fueled resentment among the nobility, who conspired against him in 1319 but failed. The Ilkhan Abu Sa'id, however, also disliked Chupan's influence and successfully eliminated him from court. He fled in 1327 to Herat, where the Kartids executed him. Several of his sons fled to the Golden Horde or the Mamluks of Egypt while others were killed.

== Baghdad Khatun ==
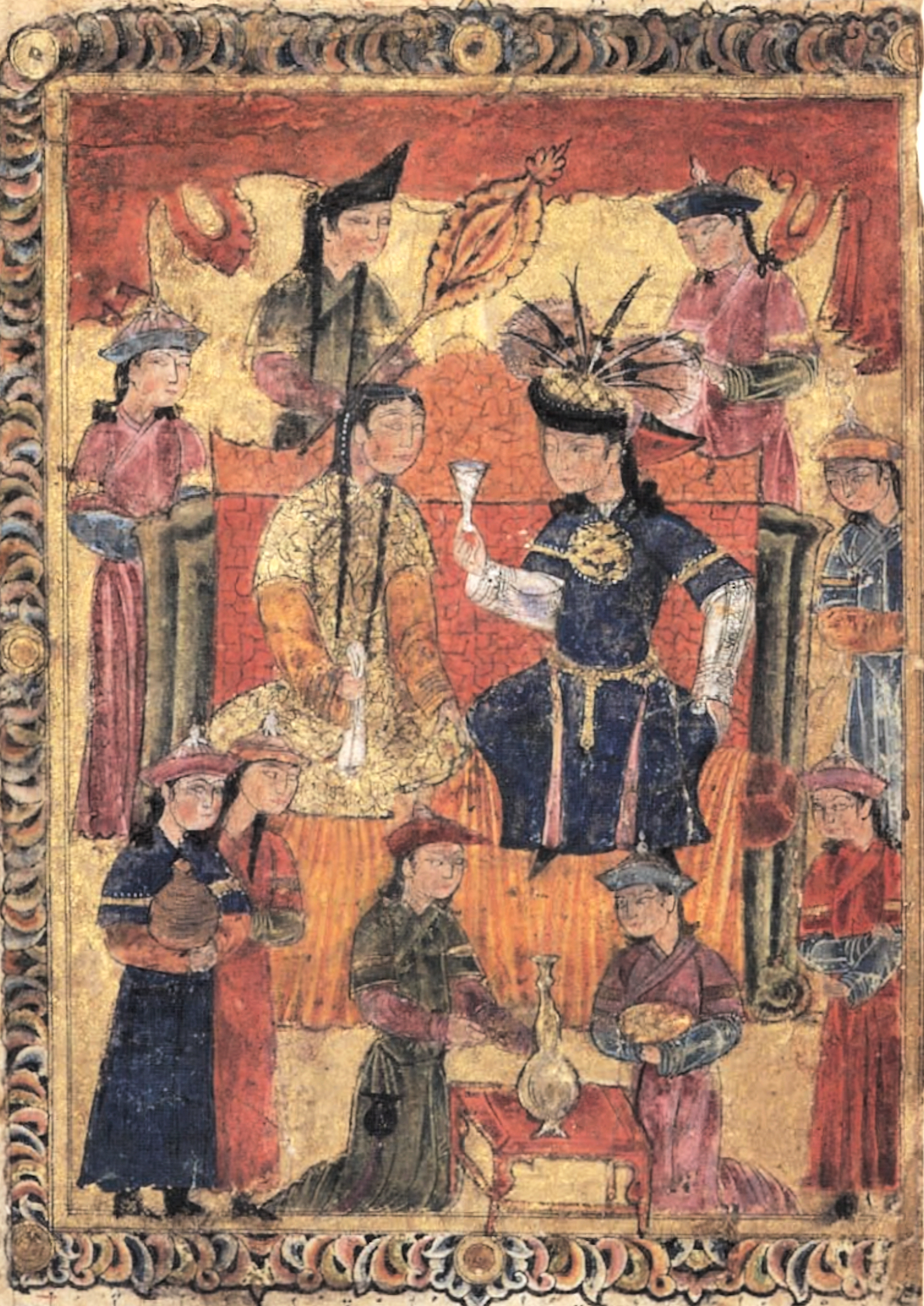
A contemporary princely scene from Isfahan, during the last period of Chobanid control. Mu'nis al-ahrar frontipiece, Isfahan, 1341.

The Chobanids were not completely wiped out from Persia. A daughter of Chupan's, Baghdad Katun, had caught the eye of Abu Sa'id. During Chupan's lifetime, she had been married to Hasan Buzurg, the future founder of the Jalayirids, but after Chupan fled Hasan Buzurg divorced her, and she married Abu Sa'id. She quickly gained influence over the Ilkhan and exercised the wide powers given to her. She was alleged (but never proven) to have been involved in any conspiracies against the Ilkhan, but was believed by some to have caused Abu Sa'id's death in 1335. Abu Sa'id's successor Arpa Ke'un executed her.

== Role during the fall of the Ilkhanate, and Hasan-i Kuchak ==
Arpa Ke'un's position proved to be weak; when a granddaughter of Chupan, Delsad Katun, fled to Diyarbakr, it caused the governor of that region to attack and defeat the Ilkhan. During the strife that occurred in the next few years, individual members of the Chobanids sided with various factions, such as Arpa or Hasan Buzurg. The latter ended up marrying Delsad Katun, who provided for the heirs to the Jalayirid position.

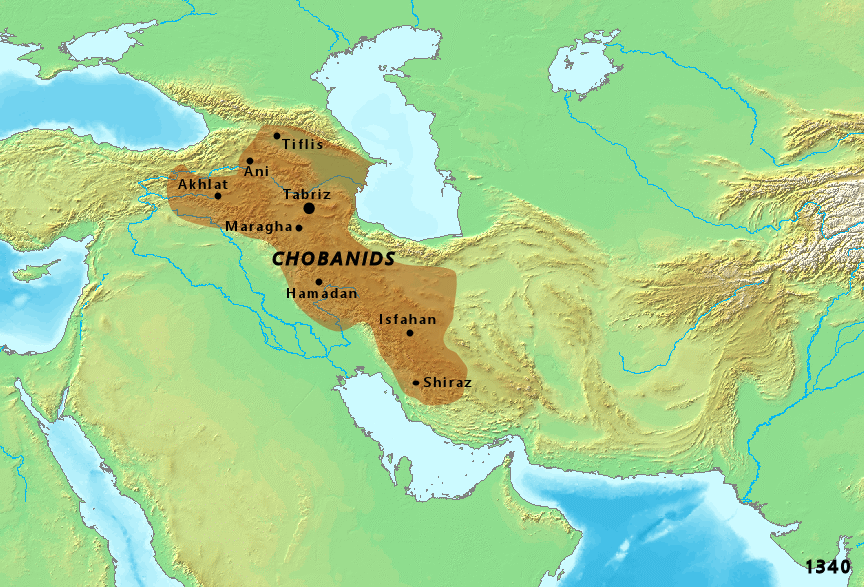
Map of the Chobanids (maximum extent, circa 1340)

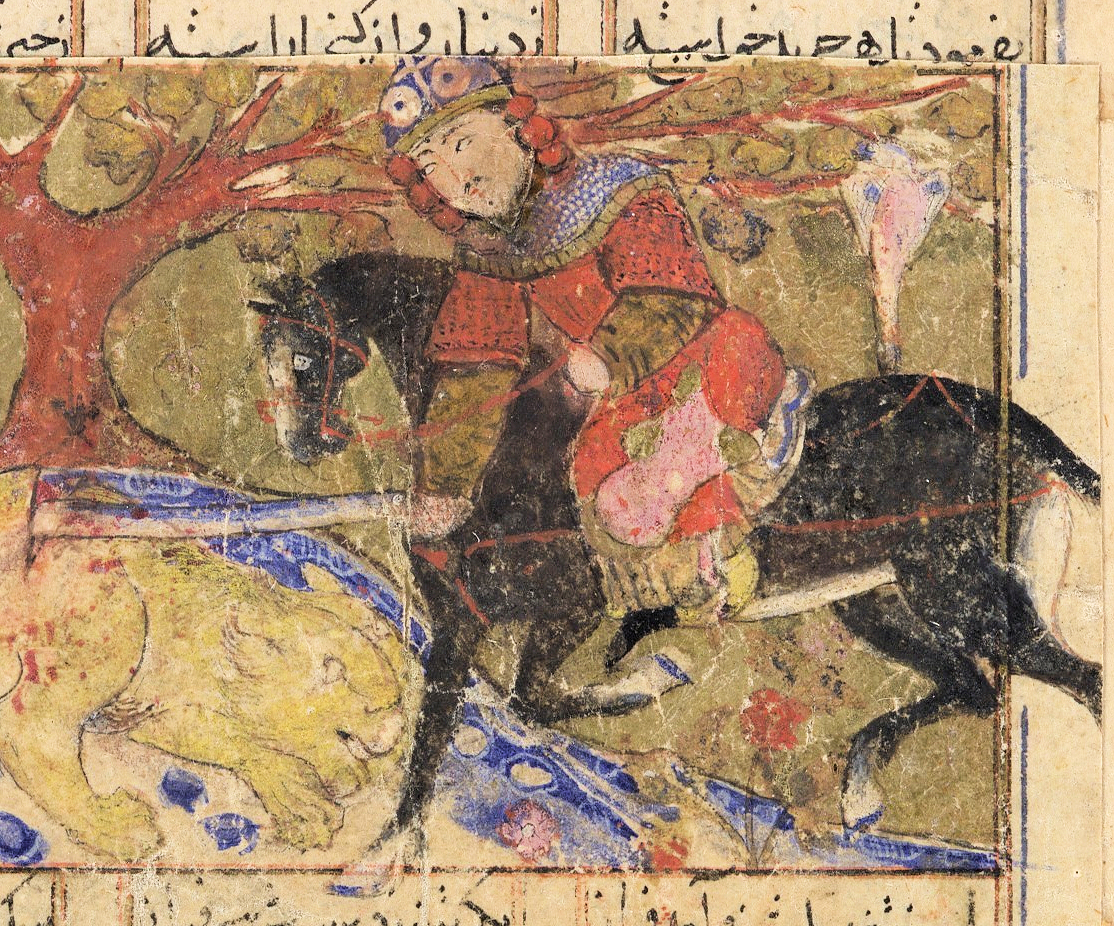
Isfandiyar slaying the lions. Shahnama 1330–1340, Isfahan

While the Jalayirids were consolidating their position in Iraq, however, other Chobanids were also busy. Hasan Kucek, a grandson of Chupan, rallied much of the Chobanid family to his side and defeated the Jalayirids in 1338, paving the way for a Chobanid realm in the area around Tabriz. That same year, he elevated Sati Beg, sister of Abu Sa'id and widow of Chupan, to the Ilkhanid throne. To keep Sati Beg in check, he forced her to marry his puppet Suleiman Khan. Hasan Kucek continued to fight the Jalayirids (a fight which was further complicated by the incursions made by Togha Temur of Khurasan), but family infighting proved to be the most difficult challenge.

To the south, Pir Husayn Chubani was designated as governor of the region of Fars and Isfahan regions from 1339 to 1342. The Chobanids firmly controlled Isfahan at that time, until the takeover of the city by the Injuid Abu Ishaq Inju in 1342, who replaced the Chobanids in southern Iran with the rule of the Injuids.

Several members defected to the Jalayirids; in any case, Hasan Kucek was forced to deal with them up until his death in 1343.

== Malek Ashraf and the Chobanid decline ==
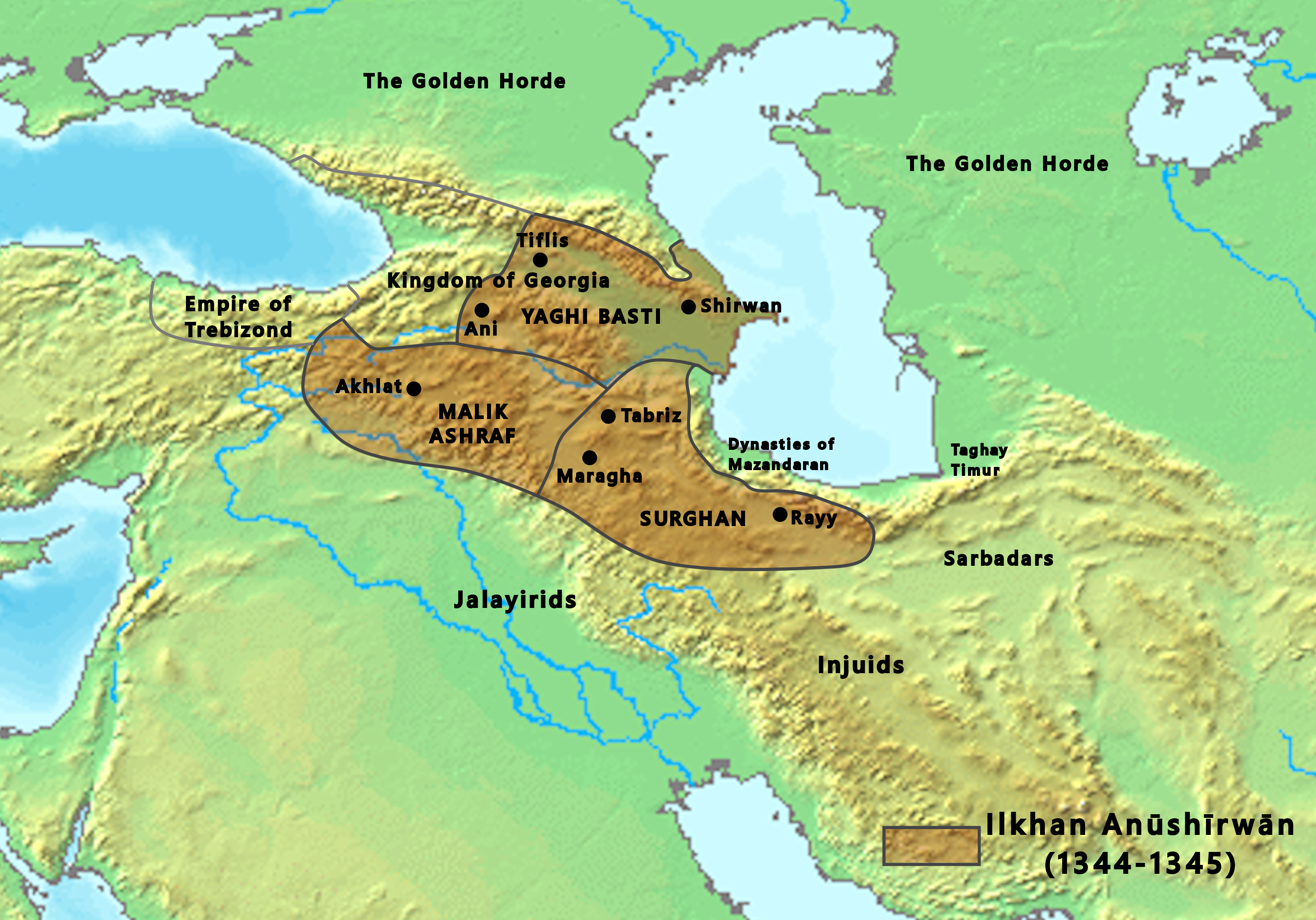
Division of Anūshīrwān’s domains among the Chopanids, according to the agreement of 745 (1344–5)

A power struggle quickly emerged after Hasan Kucek's death. During the dispute, Hasan Kucek's brother Malek Asraf gained the upper hand and eliminated his uncles. By the end of 1344, Malek Asraf had gained effective control of the Chobanid lands. Like his predecessor, Malek Asraf used puppet monarchs, such as the Ilkhanid Anūshīrwān (1344–1357), from behind which he ruled. During his reign, the Chobanid attempted to capture Baghdad from the Jalayirids in 1347 but failed miserably. He also failed to seize Fars from the Injuids in 1350. As his reign wore on, Malek Asraf became more and more cruel, prompting widespread dissatisfaction amongst his subjects. When forces of the Golden Horde overran the Chobanid realm and captured Tabriz in 1357, few lamented the loss of power by the Chupanids. Malek Asraf was executed, and his family was brought north to the Golden Horde. Malek Asraf's offspring were eventually killed off in Persia, bringing a definitive end to the Chobanids as a power.

== Genealogy of House of Chupan ==
House of Chupan

Chupanids
Injuids

Chupan
Timur-Tash	Shaykh-Mahmud	Yaghi-Basti r. 1343–1343 r. 1343–1344	Surghan r. 1344–1345
Hasan r. 1338–1343	Malik-Ashraf r. 1345–1357	Pir-Husayn r. 1339–1342

== See also ==
- Dai Chopan
- Dey Chopan District
- Chopan – a town in India

== Sources ==
- Melville, Charles; Zaryāb, ʿAbbās (1991). "CHOBANIDS". Encyclopaedia Iranica, Vol. V, Fasc. 5. pp. 496–502.
