= Shaikh Mahmoud =

Shaikh Mahmoud (d. around 1327) was a member of the Chupanid family who lived in the Ilkhanate. He was the fourth son of Mongol emir and general Chupan.

During Chupan's lifetime, Mahmoud was made governor of Armenia and Georgia. Upon the fall of his father in 1327 by the Ilkhan Abu Sa'id, he was brought to Tabriz and executed.

Shaikh Mahmud had four sons; of these, Pir Hosayn would play an influential role in the strife amongst the Chupanids in the 1340s.

== Sources ==
- Melville, Charles; Zaryāb, ʿAbbās (1991). "CHOBANIDS". Encyclopaedia Iranica, Vol. V, Fasc. 5. pp. 496–502.
