= Suleiman Khan =

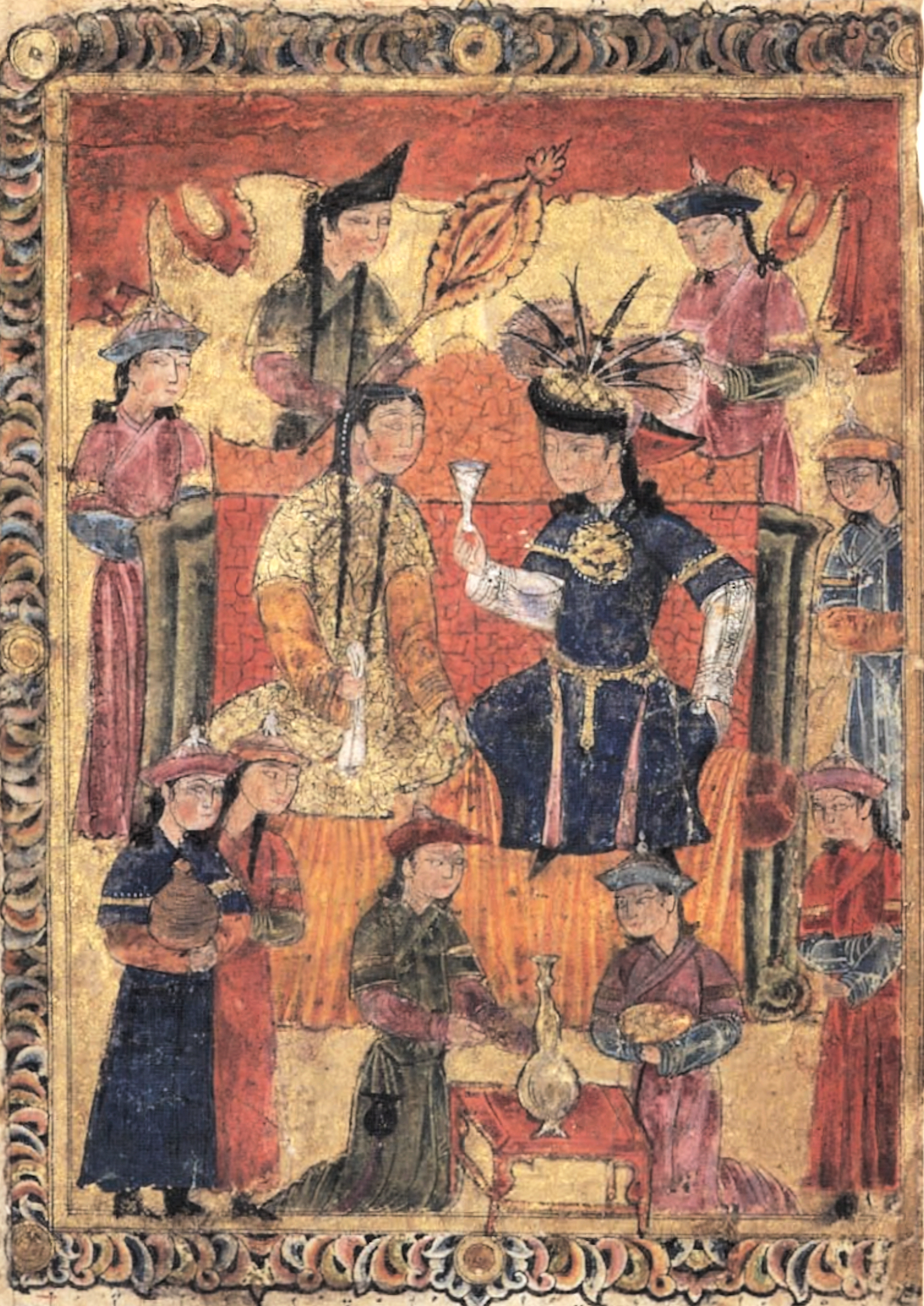
- A possible contemporary depiction of Sati Beg (enthroned, left, with her husband or her son). Mu'nis al-ahrar frontipiece, Isfahan, 1341.

Il-Khan Chupanid puppet
- Reign: May 1339 - 1343
- Predecessor: Muhammad
- Successor: Anushirwan
- Born: Ilyas
- Spouse: Sati Beg
- House: Borjigin
- Father: Yusufshah

Suleiman Khan (Persian: ﺳﻠﻴﻤاﻥ ﺧﺎﻥ) was a Chobanid puppet for the throne of the Ilkhanate during the breakdown of central authority in Persia.

== Life ==
His birth name was Ilyas and he was descended from the great-grandson of the Ilkhan Hülegü's third son Yoshmut. Like Jalayirid puppet Jahan Temür, his ancestors had fallen out of favor in Ilkhanate. Yoshmut lost a kurultai to Abaqa in 1265 and died on 18 Jul 1271. Yoshmut's son and Ilyas' grandfather Sogai were executed for treason against Arghun in 1289.

Ilyas was raised to the throne around May 1339 by the Chobanid Hasan Kucek and was given title Suleiman Khan. He then married Sati Beg, who had previously been Hasan Kucek's puppet Ilkhan despite being very younger than her. Suleiman was present at the battle on the Jaghatu against the Jalayirids under Hasan Buzurg in June 1340; the Chobanids emerged victorious. Around 1341 the Sarbadars, in an attempt to foster an alliance with the Chobanids, accepted Hasan Kucek as their suzerain, and also recognized Suleiman as Ilkhan. He lost a battle against Eretna near Sivas later.

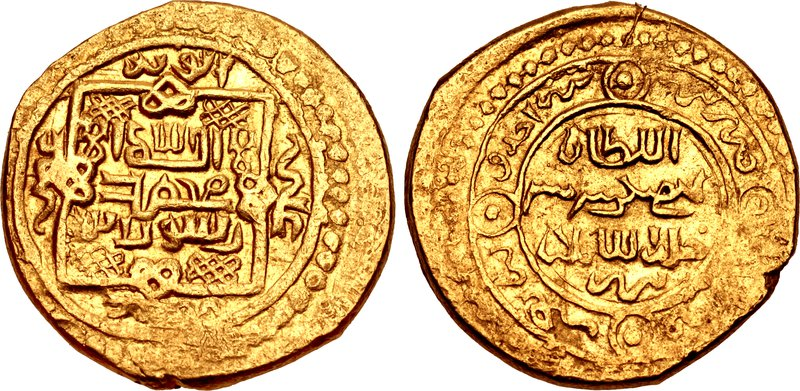
Gold coinage of Sulayman Khan. Tabriz mint. Dated AH 741 (1340-1 CE)

In 1343 Hasan Kucek was murdered and a rivalry broke out for the succession between Sati Beg's son Surgan, Yagi Basti and Malek Ashraf. When Malek Ashraf defeated Surgan and accused Suleiman of murdering Hasan. Suleiman amassed a part of Hasan Kucek's treasury as well, which led to Surgan, Sati Beg and Suleiman concluding an alliance. Suleiman appealed to Hasan Buzurg to intervene, who escorted him to Tabriz. Malek Ashraf raised another puppet named Anushirwan as new Ilkhan and rode to Tabriz. Hasan Buzurg meanwhile withdrew his support from Suleiman. They fled to Diyarbakir, where Hajji Taghay's nephew Ibrahimshah; where his coins representing Suleiman were struck until 1345.

== Sources ==
- Charles Melville and 'Abbas Zaryab. "Chobanids." Encyclopedia Iranica.

| Preceded by Sati Beg | Ilkhan (Chobanid candidate); 1339–1343 | Succeeded by Anushirwan |
