= Yagi Basti =

Member of the Chobanids (d. 1344)

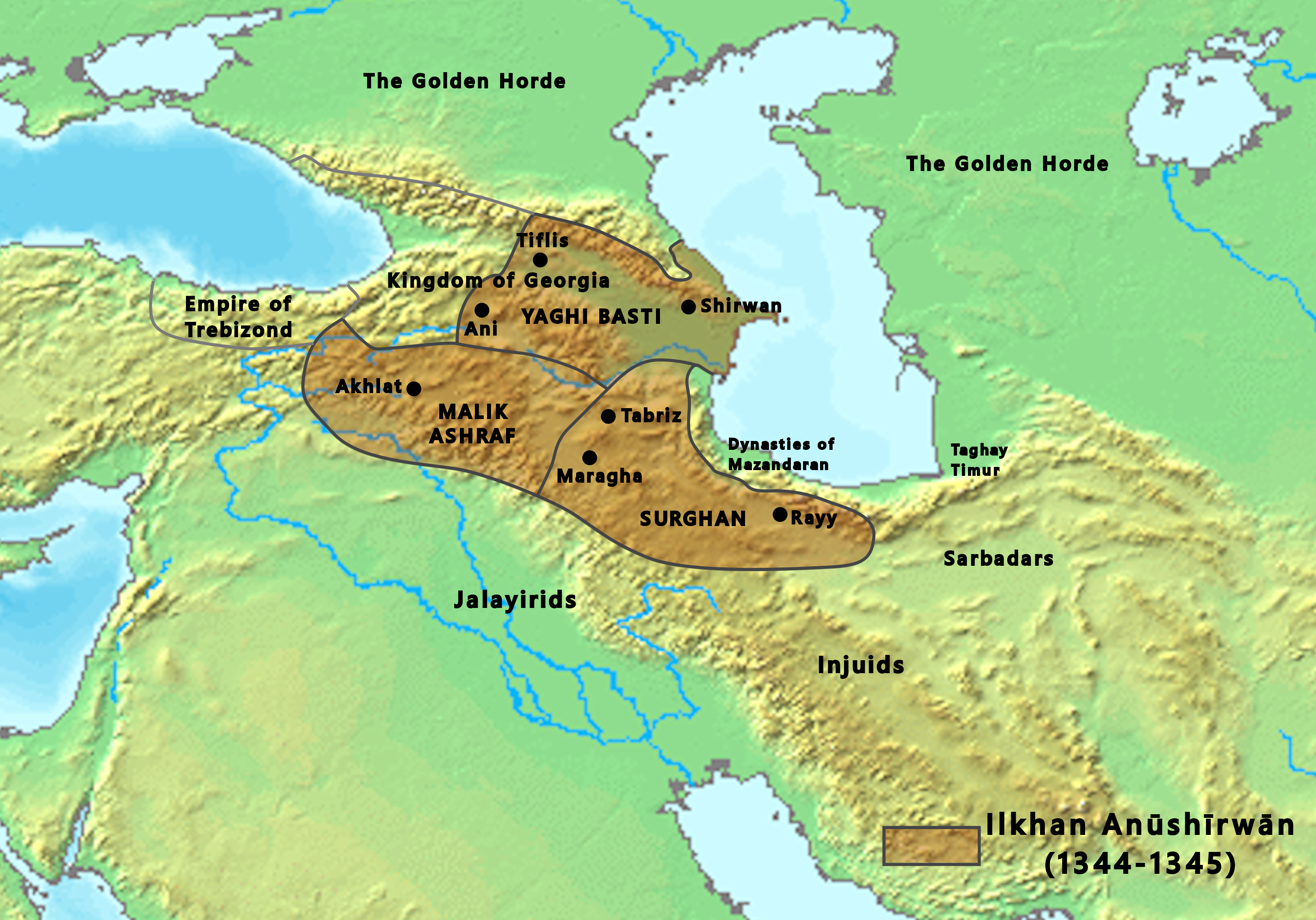
Division of Anūshīrwān’s domains according to the agreement of 745 (1344–5) among the Chopanids, including the northern area held by Yagi Basti.

Yagi Basti (d. c. 1344) was a member of the Chobanid family and the ruler of Shiraz for a part of 1343. He was the son of Amir Chupan by his second wife.

== Career ==
Like most of the other Chobanids, Yagi Basti threw his support behind his nephew Hasan Kuchak when the latter took control of northwestern Iran in 1338. Eventually, however, he had a falling out with Hasan Kuchak and fled to the court of the Jalayirid Hasan Buzurg, who controlled Baghdad, in 1341. There he met the Injuid Mas'ud Shah and formed a plan to seize the city of Shiraz from Pir Hosayn, who was Yagi Basti's cousin.

The two led an army to take Shiraz, only to learn that Pir Hosayn had lost the city to another Injuid, Abu Ishaq. This did not stop Yagi Basti and Mas'ud Shah from entering Shiraz; once the two had gained control, Yagi Basti murdered Mas'ud and seized power for himself. Without his Injuid ally, however, Yagi Basti had little support within the city, and in March 1343 he was forced out by supporters of Abu Ishaq. Yagi Basti had little choice but to again resort to seeking refuge with Hasan Buzurg.

Yagi Basti soon formed an alliance with Hasan Kuchak's brother Malek Asraf, who had also fled to Baghdad. Hasan Kuchak, evidently afraid that the two would move against him, was able to convince Hasan Buzurg to abandon any support he planned to give them. Even without Jalayirid support, Yagi Basti and Malek Asraf campaigned in Fars and were able to sack Abarquh. They were heading south in an attempt to take Shiraz when they learned that Hasan Kuchak had been murdered in December 1343.

Malek Asraf, Yagi Basti and his half-brother Surgan gained control of the Chobanid realm after Hasan Kuchak's death. Although they at first agreed to split up the Chobanid territories among themselves, civil war soon erupted amongst them. Around 1344, Yagi Basti was secretly murdered in Tabriz by Malek Asraf, who went on to defeat Surgan and take sole possession of the Chobanid realm.

Preceded by Abu Ishaq	Ruler of Shiraz; 1343	Succeeded by Abu Ishaq
