= Ghazan II =

Ghazan Khan
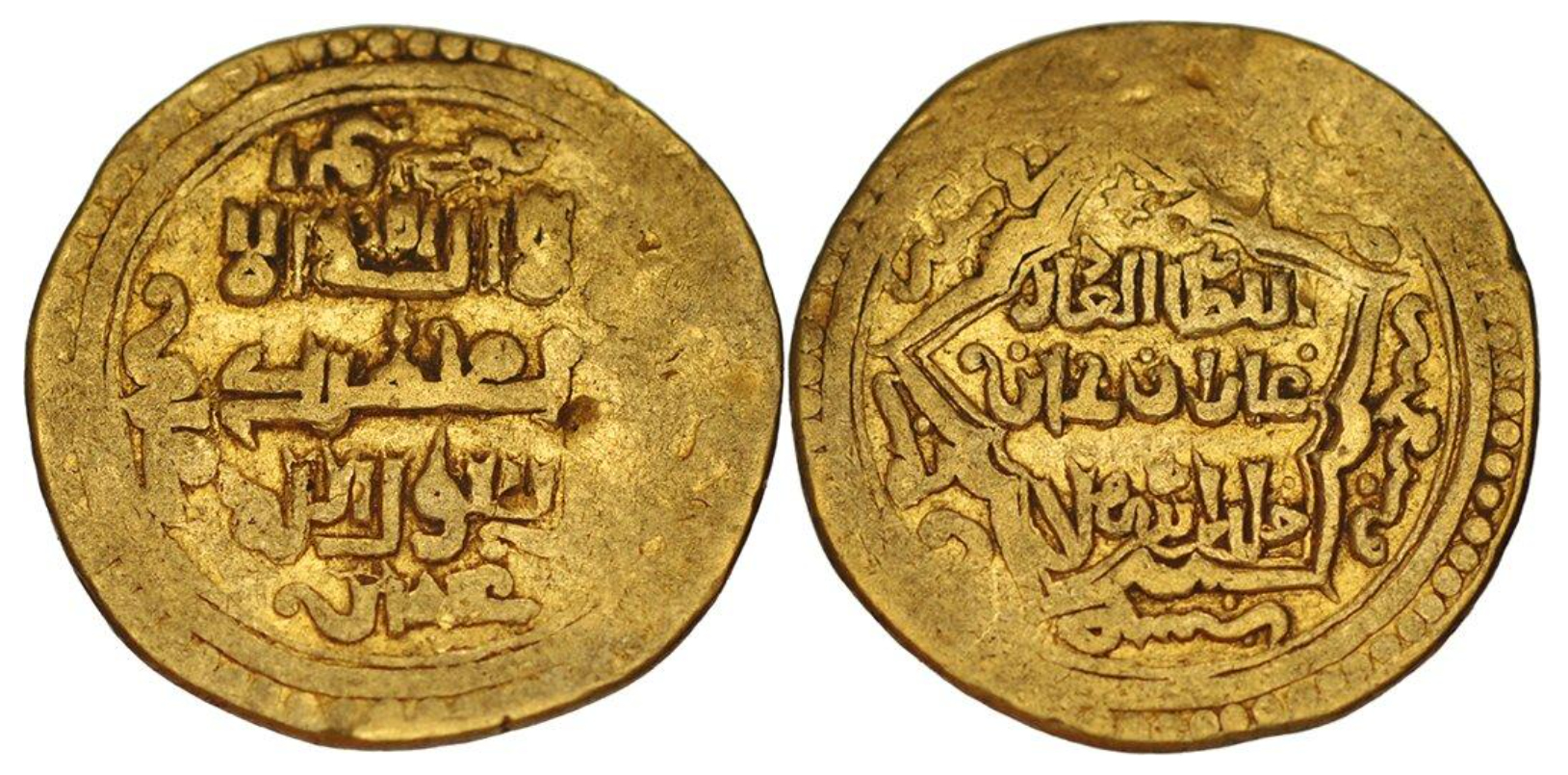
- Gold coinage of Ghazan II. Tabriz mint. Dated AH 757 (1356 CE)

Il-Khan Chupanid puppet
- Reign: 1356 - 1357
- Predecessor: Anushirwan
- Died: 1357

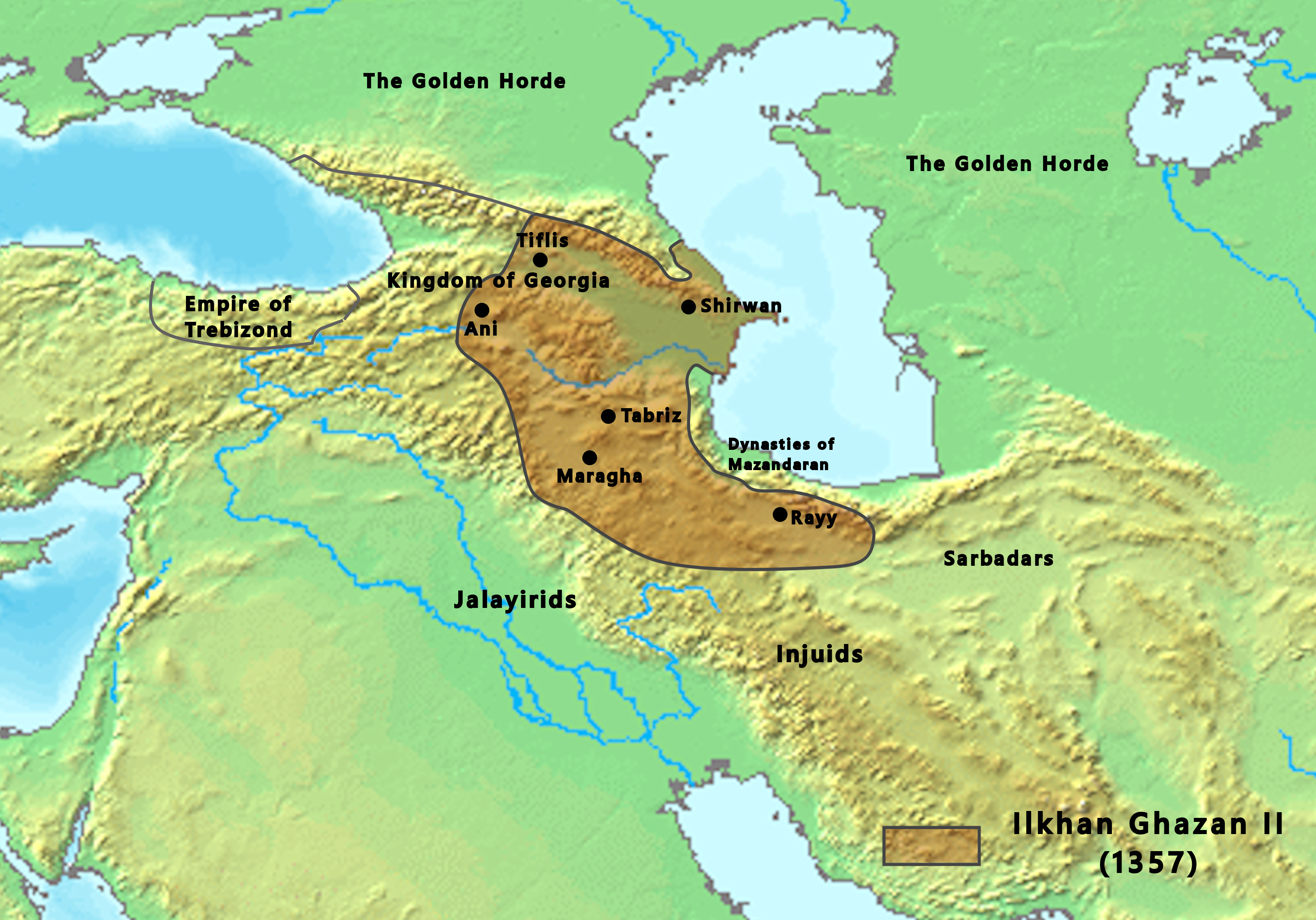
Territory of Ghazan II in 1357

Ghazan II (Persian: غازان) was the last nominal ruler of the Ilkhanate, ruling in 1356-1357.

== Life ==
His existence is known through works of medieval authors and numismatics, but otherwise is unattested in history. He appears to have been a puppet of Malek Ashraf in 1356. According to Abū Bakr al-Qutbī al-Ahrī, author of Tarikh-i Uways, when Jani Beg demanded Malek Ashraf to submit in 1357, he replied: "He is the padishah of the ulus of Berke, he has nothing to do with the ulus of Abaqa, for here the ruler is Ghazan and the emirate is mine." He was mentioned by Nur al-Din Azhdari in his Ghazan-nama, whose father Shams al-Din Muhammad served Ghazan II.

His coins have been minted in Mardin (1356), Qom (1357), Soltaniyeh, Maragha, Ray, Ani, Barda, Ganja, Khoy, Mamaqan, Nakhchivan, Sharur, Tabriz, Tbilisi, Urmia and others. The coins minted in the name of Ghazan II in Tabriz and Tiflis followed the designs of the neighbouring Golden Horde, while those minted in Maragha followed traditional Ilkhanid designs.

Preceded by Anushirwan	Ilkhan (Chobanid candidate); 1356–1357	Succeeded by Discontinued
