= Nur al-Din Azhdari =

Nur al-Din Azhdari was an Iranian poet, physician and bureaucrat who served in the court of the Ilkhanate and Jalayirids. He is principally known for his history book Ghazan-nama, written between 1357 and 1362.

== Sources ==
- Babaie, Sussan (2019). Iran After the Mongols. Bloomsbury Publishing. ISBN 978-1788315289.
- Melville, Charles (2012). Persian Historiography: A History of Persian Literature. Bloomsbury Publishing. ISBN 978-1845119119.
- Wing, Patrick (2016). The Jalayirids: Dynastic State Formation in the Mongol Middle East. Edinburgh University Press. ISBN 978-1474402255.
