= Anushirwan =

Claimant to the Ilkhanid throne

Anushirwan Khan
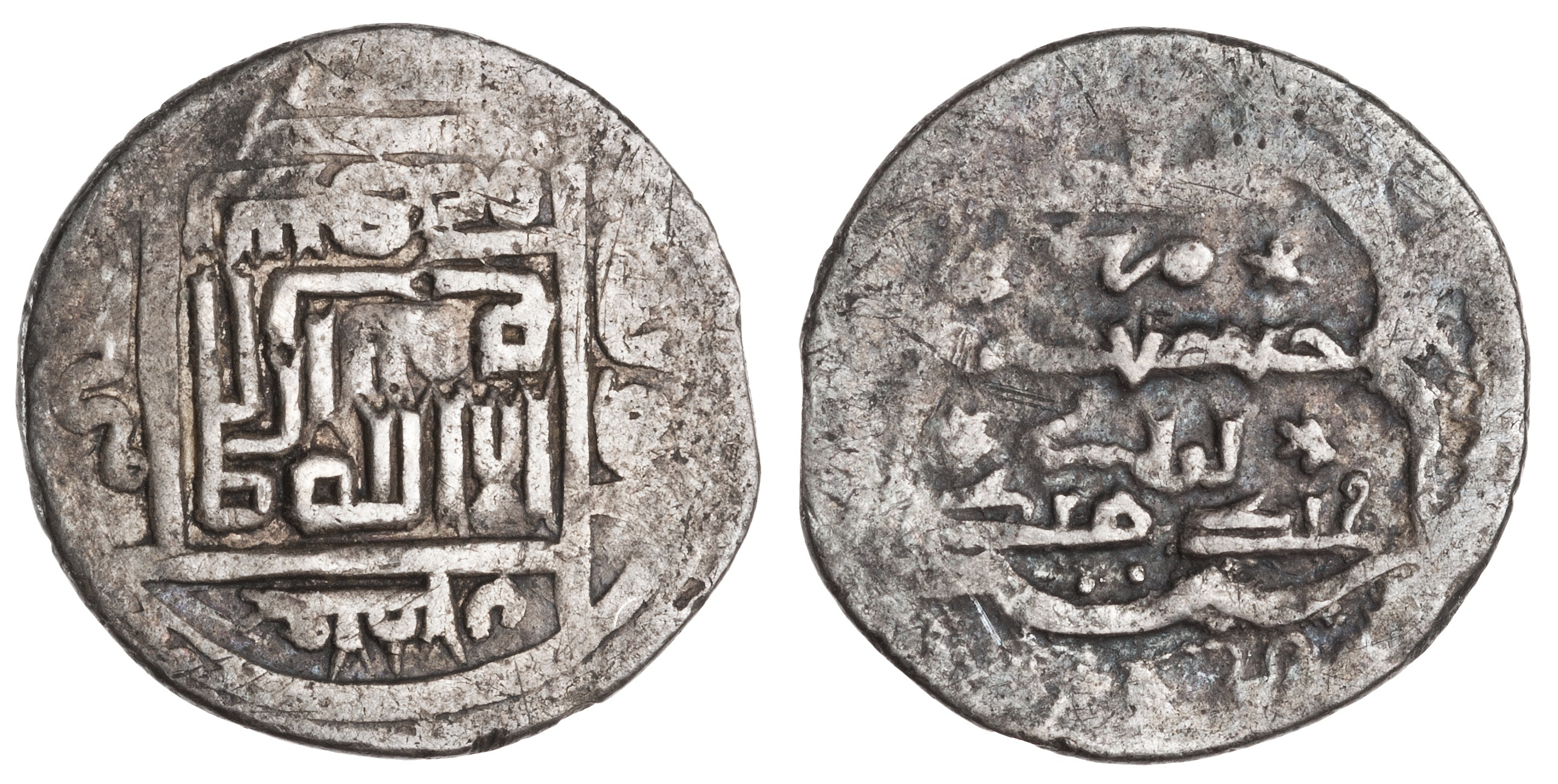
- Silver coin minted in Tiflis (Tbilisi) bearing the name of Anushirwan. Struck between 1344 and 1353 (left = obverse; right = reverse) at the time David IX ruled in Georgia

Il-Khan Chupanid puppet
- Reign: 1344–1357
- Predecessor: Suleiman Khan
- Successor: Ghazan II

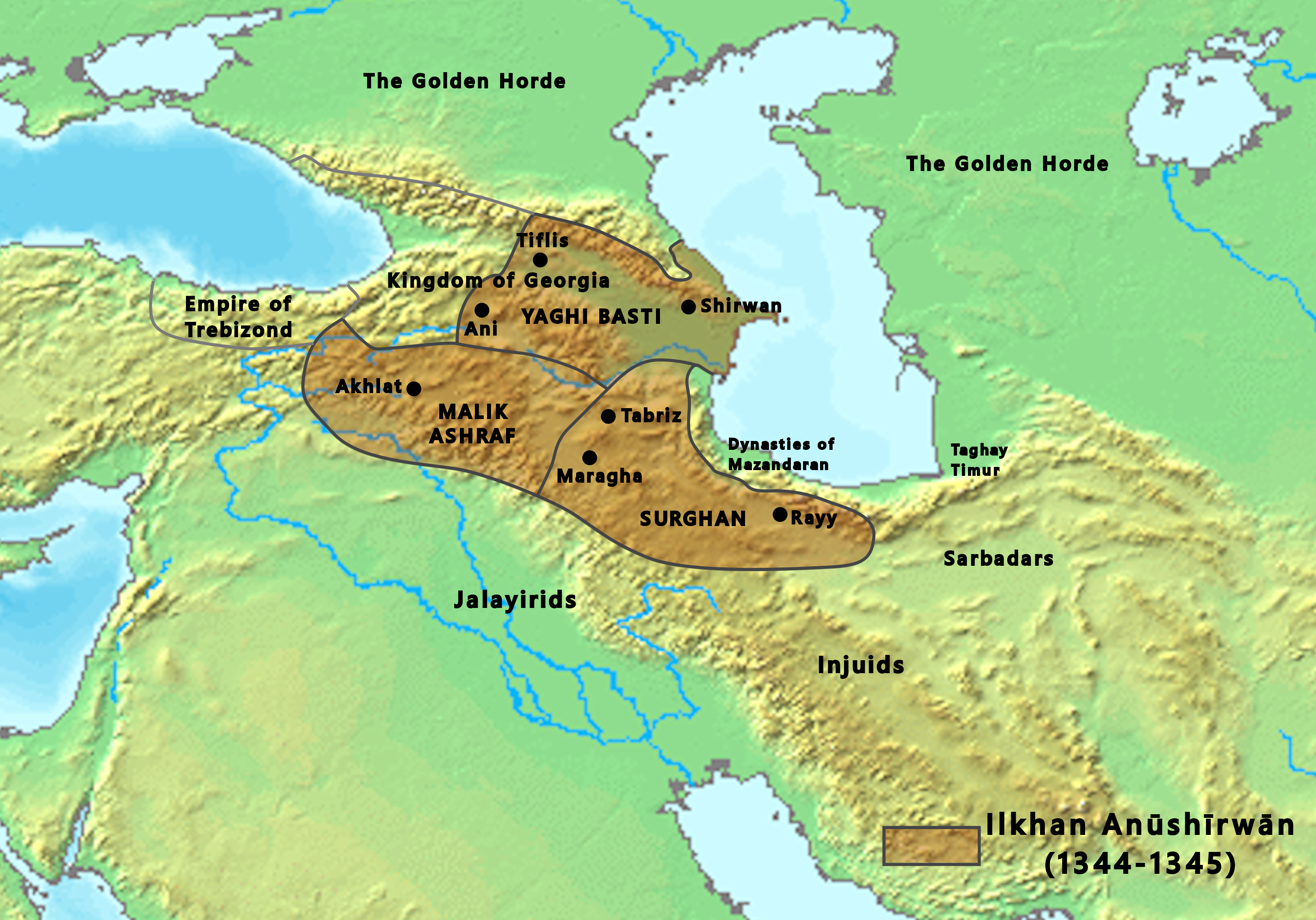
Division of Anūshīrwān’s domains among the Chopanids, according to the agreement of 745 (1344–5).

Anushirwan Khan (Persian: انوشیروان خان, Anūshīrvān Khān) occupied the Ilkhanid throne in Arran from 1344 until his death in 1357. He was a puppet of the Chobanid ruler Malek Ashraf and possessed no power of his own. He is notable for being the last of the Ilkhan dynasty to have coins struck in his name.

Anushirwan's origins are obscure. One account suggests that Malek Ashraf's wardrobe keeper, a certain Nushirvan, was raised to the throne and given the name Anushirvan, after the famous Sasanian king Khosrow I Anushirvan. The Chobanids struck coins in his name until 1357.

== Sources ==
- Akopyan, Alexander V.; Mosanef, Farbod (2015). "Between Jujids and Jalayirids: the coinage of the Chopanids, Akhijuq and their contemporaries, 754–759/1353–1358". Der Islam. 92. De Gruyter: 197–246. doi:10.1515/islam-2015-0008.
- Hope, Michael (2021). "The Political Configuration of Late Ilkhanid Iran: A Case Study of the Chubanid Amirate (738–758/1337–1357)". Iran: Journal of the British Institute of Persian Studies: 1–17. doi:10.1080/05786967.2021.1889930. S2CID 233888764.
- Wing, Patrick (2016). The Jalayirids: Dynastic State Formation in the Mongol Middle East. Edinburgh University Press. pp. 1–256. ISBN 9781474402262.

Preceded by Suleiman Khan	Ilkhan (Chobanid candidate); 1344–1357	Succeeded by Ghazan II
