= Ilkhanate =

1256–1335 Post-Mongol Empire khanate in Iran

Land of Iran ایران‌زمین (Persian) Irānzamin ᠬᠦᠯᠡᠭᠦ ᠵᠢᠨ ᠤᠯᠤᠰ Hülegü-yin ulus (Mongol)
- 1256–1335
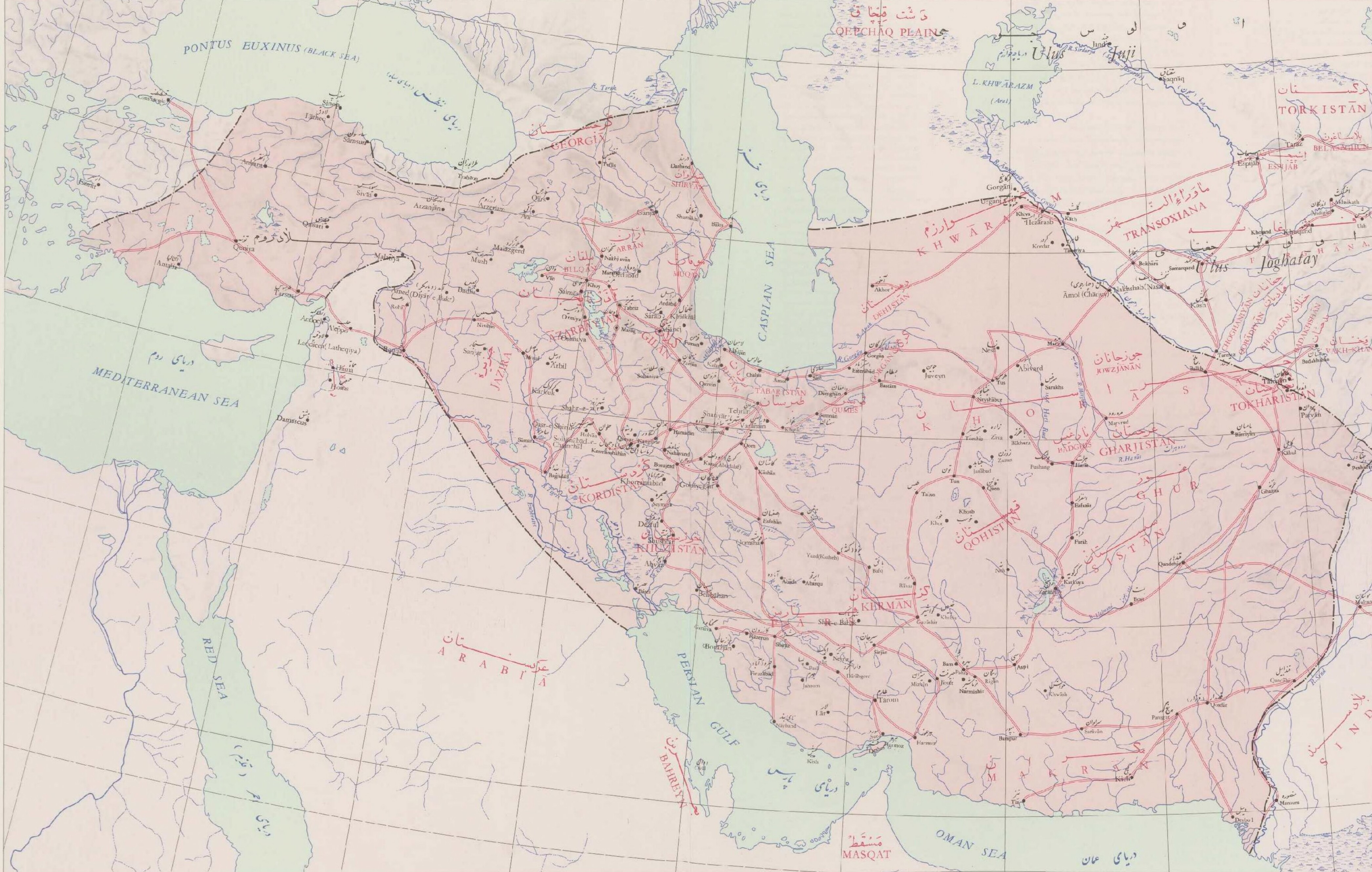
- The Ilkhanate under Ghazan
- Status: Administrative region of Mongol Empire (1256–1259); Independent khanate (1260–1335)
- Capital: Maragheh (1258-1265); Tabriz (1265–1307); Soltaniyeh (1306–1335)
- Official languages: Middle Mongol (ruling dynasty, court, documents); Persian (lingua franca, administration, documents)
- Common languages: Unofficial: Arabic; Turkic
- Religion: State religion : Mongolian Buddhism (Until 1295); Islam (From 1295); Minority : Christianity (minority); Zoroastrianism (minority)
- Government: Monarchy
- Khan/Padishah
  - 1256–1265: Hulegu Khan
  - 1316–1335: Abu Sa'id

Area
- 1310 est.: 3,750,000 km^{2} (1,450,000 sq mi)
Preceded by
Mongol Empire
Succeeded by
Jalayirids
Chobanids
Muzaffarids
Kartids
Sarbadars
Injuids
Mihrabanids
Eretnids
Sutayids
Kingdom of Georgia
Anatolian beyliks
Mamluk Sultanate
Timurid Empire

The Ilkhanate or Il-khanate was a Mongol khanate founded in the southwestern territories of the Mongol Empire. It was ruled by the Il-Khans or Ilkhanids (Persian: ایلخانان, romanized: Īlkhānān), and was known to the Mongols as Hülegü Ulus (lit. 'people / state of Hülegü'). The Ilkhanid realm was officially known as the Land of Iran (Irānzamin) or simply Iran. It was established after Hülegü, the son of Tolui and grandson of Genghis Khan, inherited the West Asian and Central Asian part of the Mongol Empire after his brother Möngke Khan died in 1259.

The Ilkhanate's core territory was situated in what are now the countries of Iran, Azerbaijan, and Turkey. At its greatest extent, the Ilkhanate also included parts of modern Iraq, Syria, Armenia, Georgia, Afghanistan, Turkmenistan, Pakistan, Tajikistan, and Dagestan (Russia). Later Ilkhanid rulers, beginning with Ghazan in 1295, converted to Islam. In the 1330s, the Ilkhanate was ravaged by the Black Death. The last ilkhan, Abu Sa'id Bahadur Khan, died in 1335, after which the Ilkhanate disintegrated.

The State of the Ilkhanate was known as the Ulus of Hülegü to the Mongols during that time, as their territory was derived from one of uluses allocated to Genghis (Chinggis) Khan's descendants. The Ilkhanid rulers, although of non-Iranian origin, tried to advertise their authority by tying themselves to the Iranian past, and they recruited historians to present the Mongols as heirs to the Sasanian Empire (224–651). Native intellectuals interested in their own history interpreted the unification by the Mongols as a revival of their long-lost dynastic tradition, and the concept of "Land of Iran" (Irān-zamin) was considered an important ideology, which was further developed by the later Safavid Empire (1501–1736). Similarly to the development in China under the Yuan dynasty, the revival of the concept of territorial unity, although not intended by the Mongols, became a lasting legacy of Mongol rule in Iran.

== History ==
=== Origin ===
When Muhammad II of Khwarazm ordered a contingent of merchants, dispatched by the Mongols, to be killed, Genghis Khan declared war on the Anushtegin dynasty in 1219. The Mongols overran the empire, occupying the major cities and population centers between 1219 and 1221. Iran was ravaged by the Mongol detachment under Jebe and Subutai, who left the area in ruin. Transoxiana also came under Mongol control after the invasion.

Muhammad II's son Jalal al-Din Mangburni returned to Iran in c. 1224 after fleeing to India. The rival Turkic states, which were all that remained of his father's empire, quickly declared their allegiance to Jalal. He repulsed the first Mongol attempt to take Central Persia. However, Jalal al-Din was overwhelmed and crushed by Chormaqan's army sent by the Great Khan Ögedei in 1231. During the Mongol expedition, Azerbaijan and the southern Persian dynasties in Fars and Kerman voluntarily submitted to the Mongols and agreed to pay tribute.

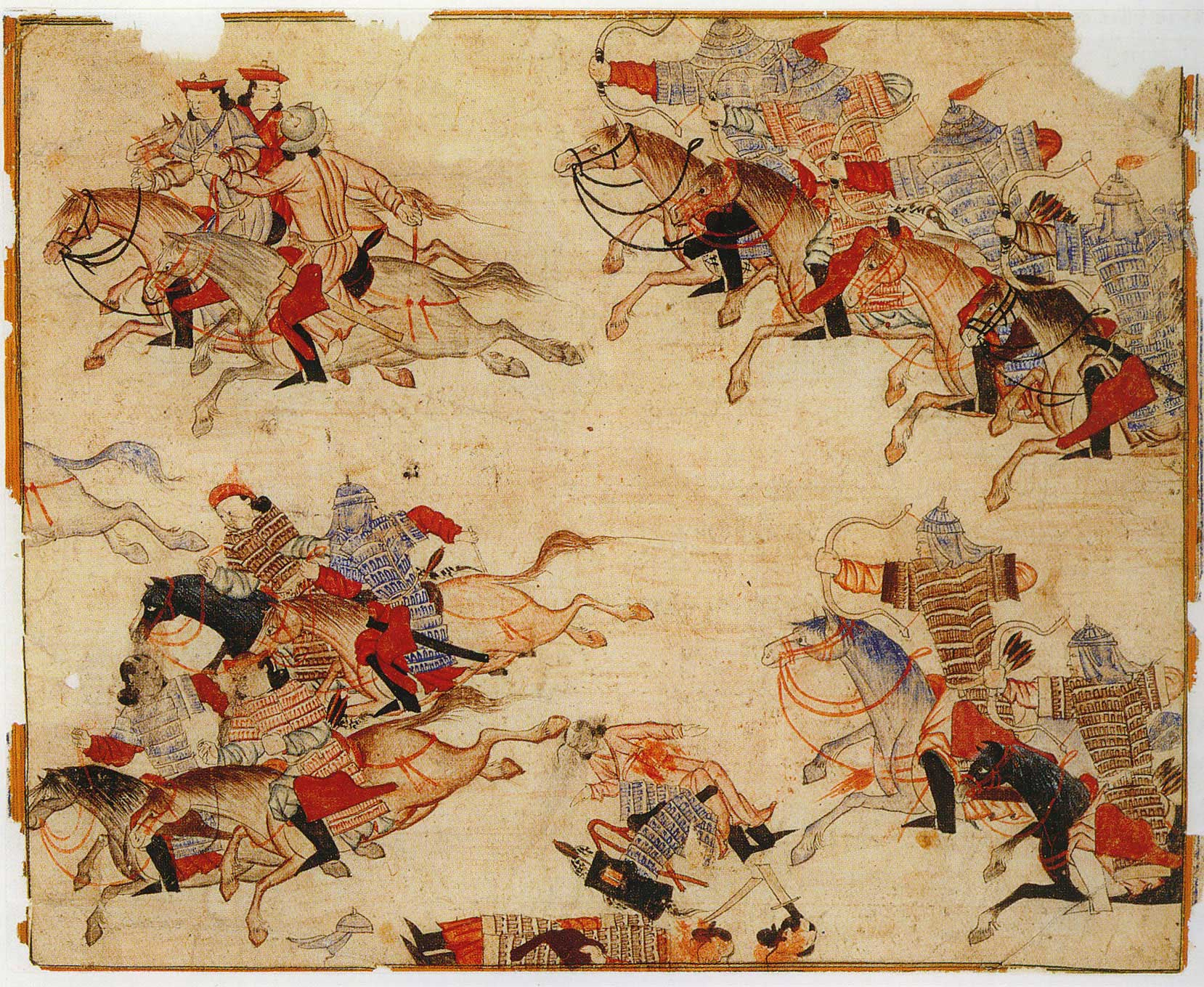
Ilkhanid depiction of mounted warriors pursuing enemies, from Rashid al-Din's Jami' al-tawarikh, early 14th century

To the west, Hamadan and the rest of Persia was secured by Chormaqan. The Mongols invaded Armenia and Georgia in 1234 or 1236, completing the conquest of the Kingdom of Georgia in 1238. They began to attack the western parts of Bagratid Armenia, which was under the Seljuks, the following year. By 1237 the Mongol Empire had subjugated most of Persia (including modern-day Azerbaijan), Armenia, Georgia (excluding Abbasid Iraq and Isma'ili strongholds), as well as all of Afghanistan and Kashmir. After the Battle of Köse Dağ in 1243, the Mongols under Baiju occupied Anatolia, while the Seljuk Sultanate of Rûm and the Empire of Trebizond became vassals of the Mongols.

In 1236 Ögedei commanded Khorasan to be restored and the city of Herat repopulated. The Mongol military governors mostly made camp in the Mughan plain in what is now Azerbaijan. Realizing the danger posed by the Mongols, the rulers of Mosul and the Armenian Kingdom of Cilicia submitted to the Great Khan. Chormaqan divided Transcaucasia into three districts based on the Mongol military hierarchy. In Georgia, the population was temporarily divided into eight tumens. In 1244, Güyük Khan stopped raising of revenue from districts in Persia as well and offered tax exemptions to others. In accordance with a complaint by the governor Arghun Aqa, Möngke Khan prohibited ortogh-merchants (Mongol-contracted Muslim traders) and nobles from abusing relay stations and civilians in 1251. He ordered a new census and decreed that each man in the Mongol-ruled West Asia must pay in proportion to his property. Persia was divided between four districts under Arghun. Möngke Khan granted the Kartids authority over Herat, Jam, Pushang (Fushanj), Ghor, Khaysar, Firuz-Kuh, Gharjistan, Farah, Sistan, Kabul, Tirah, and Afghanistan.

=== Hulegu Khan ===
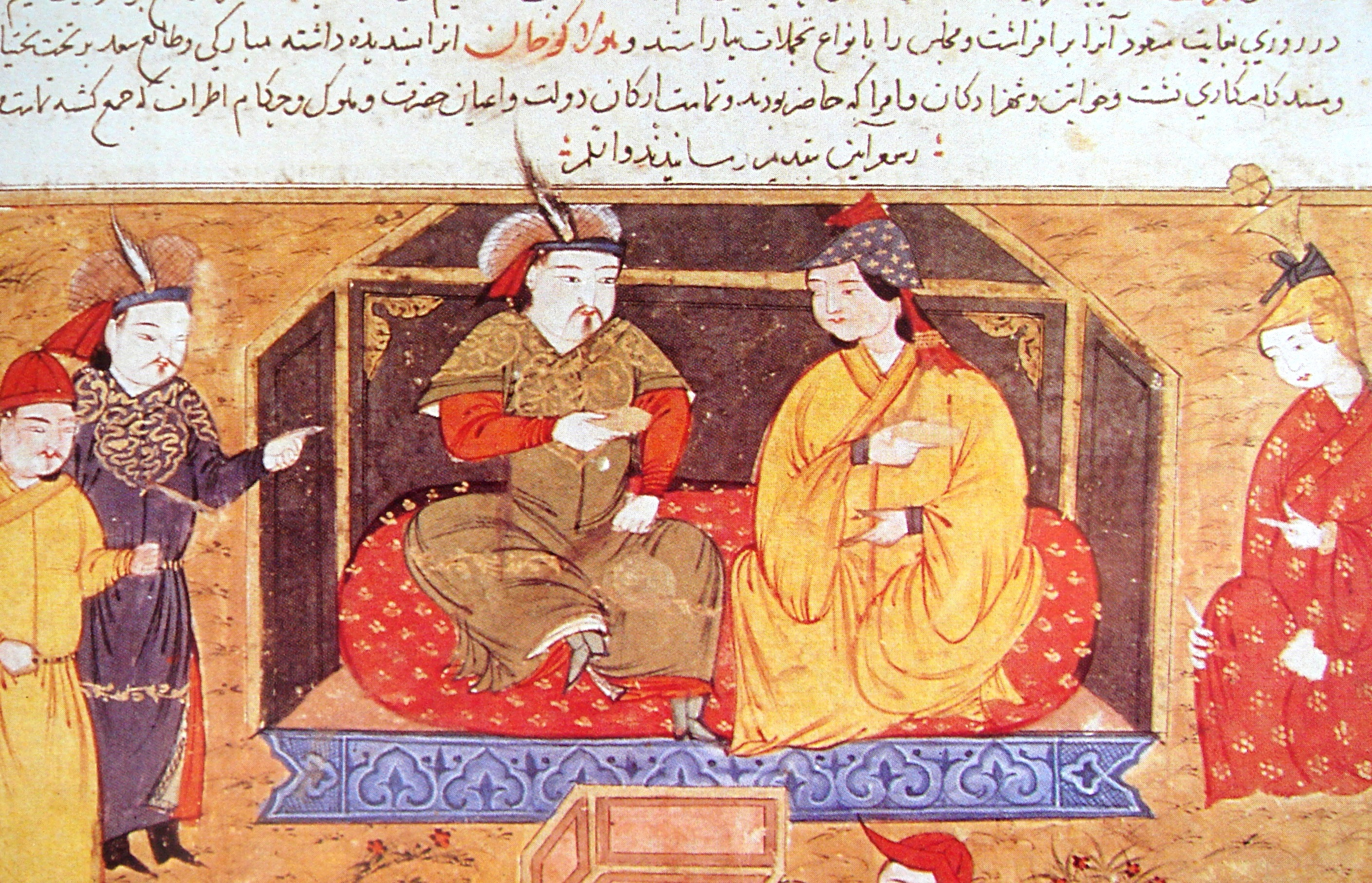
Hulegu Khan, founder of the Ilkhanate, with his Christian queen Doquz Khatun

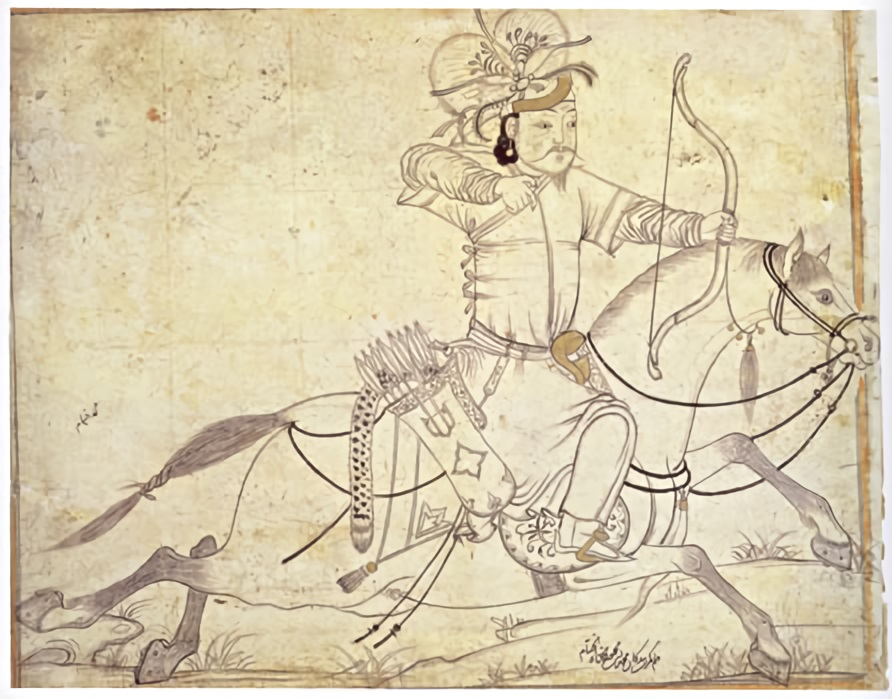
A Mongol horse archer of the 13th century

Hulegu Khan, third son of Tolui, grandson of Genghis Khan, and brother of both Möngke Khan and Kublai Khan, was the first khan of the Ilkhanate. Immediately after his brother Möngke's accession as Great Khan in 1251, Hulegu was appointed as administrator of North China, however in the following year, North China was assigned to Kublai and Hulegu tasked with conquering the Abbasid Caliphate. He was given a fifth of the entire Mongol army for the campaign and he took his sons Abaqa and Yoshmut along with him. Hulegu also took with him many Chinese scholars and astronomers, from whom the famous Persian astronomer Nasir al-Din al-Tusi learned about the mode of the Chinese calculating tables. An observatory was built on a hill of Maragheh. Taking over from Baiju in 1255, Hulegu established Mongol rule from Transoxiana to Syria. He destroyed the Nizari Ismaili state and the Abbasid Caliphate in 1256 and 1258 respectively. In 1258, Hulegu proclaimed himself ilkhan (subordinate khan). After that he advanced as far as Gaza, briefly conquering Ayyubid Syria and Aleppo in 1260. Möngke's death forced Hulegu to return to Mongolia to attend the kuriltai for the next Great Khan. He left a small force of around 10,000 behind in Palestine that was defeated at the Battle of Ain Jalut by the Mamluks of Egypt.

Due to the suspicious deaths of three Jochid princes in Hulegu's service, Berke of the Golden Horde declared war on Hulegu in 1262. According to Mamluk historians, Hulegu might have massacred Berke's troops and refused to share his war booty with Berke. Berke sought a joint attack with Baybars and forged an alliance with the Mamluks against Hulegu. The Golden Horde dispatched the young prince Nogai to invade the Ilkhanate but Hulegu forced him back in 1262. The Ilkhanid army then crossed the Terek River, capturing an empty Jochid encampment, only to be routed in a surprise attack by Nogai's forces. Many of them were drowned as the ice broke on the frozen Terek River.

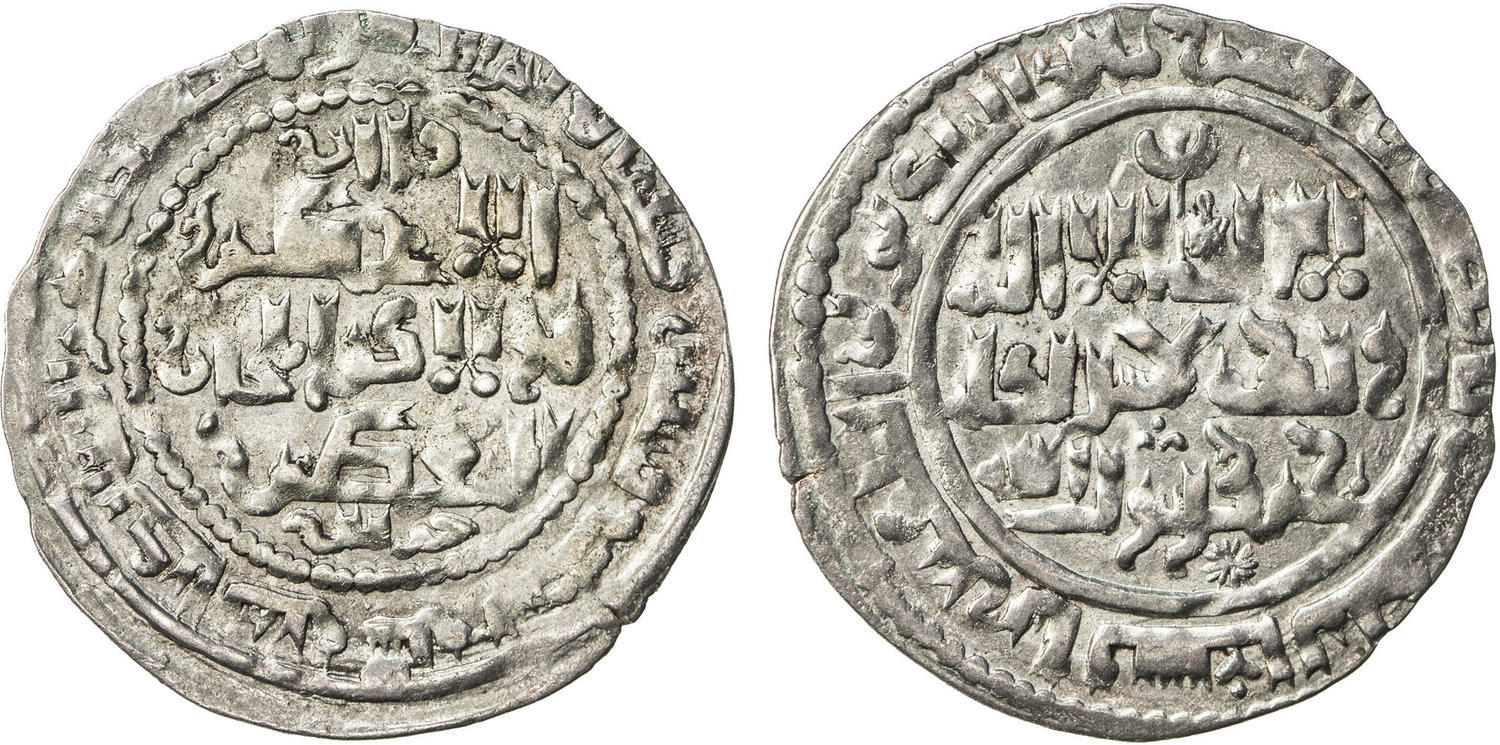
Silver dirham of Hulegu minted in Urmia, with the title Qa'an al-'Azam (Greatest Khagan). Before the reign of Ghazan, Ilkhans referred to the great Mongol khans in the coin inscriptions and official documents.

In 1262, Hulegu gave Khorasan and Mazandaran to Abaqa and northern Azerbaijan to Yoshmut. Hulegu himself spent his time living as a nomad in southern Azerbaijan and Armenia. During his early rule, the Ilkhanate experienced mass revolts by its subjects, with the exception of the Seljukids and Artuqids in Anatolia and Mardin. It was not until Shams al-Din Juvayni was appointed as vizier after 1262 that things started calming down and a more sustainable administration was implemented.

Hulegu fell ill in February 1265 after several days of banquets and hunting. He died on 8 February and his son Abaqa succeeded him in the summer.

=== Middle period (1265–1291) ===
The successor states of the Mongol Empire, its vassals, and neighbors in the early 1300s.

Upon Abaqa's accession, he immediately faced an invasion by Berke of the Golden Horde, which ended with Berke's death in Tiflis. In 1270, Abaqa defeated an invasion by Ghiyas-ud-din Baraq of the Chagatai Khanate. Abaqa's brother Tekuder sacked Bukhara in retaliation. In 1277, the Mamluks invaded Anatolia and defeated the Mongols at the Battle of Elbistan. Stung by the defeat, Abaqa executed the local regent Mu'in al-Din Parwana and replaced him with the Mongol prince Qongqortai. In 1281, Abaqa sent Mongke Temur against the Mamluks, but he too was defeated at Homs.

Abaqa's death in 1282 triggered a succession struggle between his son Arghun, supported by the Qara'unas, and his brother Tekuder, supported by the Chinggisid aristocracy. Tekuder was elected khan by the Chinggisids. Tekuder was the first Muslim ruler of the Ilkhanate but he made no active attempt to proselytize or convert his realm. However he did try to replace Mongol political traditions with Islamic ones, resulting in a loss of support from the army. Arghun used his religion against him by appealing to non-Muslims for support. When Tekuder realized this, he executed several of Arghun's supporters, and captured Arghun. Tekuder's foster son, Buaq, freed Arghun and overthrew Tekuder. Arghun was confirmed as ilkhan by Kublai Khan in February 1286.

During Arghun's reign, he actively sought to combat Muslim influence, and fought against both the Mamluks and the Muslim Mongol emir Nawruz in Khorasan. To fund his campaigns, Arghun allowed his viziers Buqa and Sa'd-ud-dawla to centralize expenditures, but this was highly unpopular and caused his former supporters to turn against him. Both viziers were killed and Arghun was murdered in 1291.

=== Religious shift (1291–1316) ===
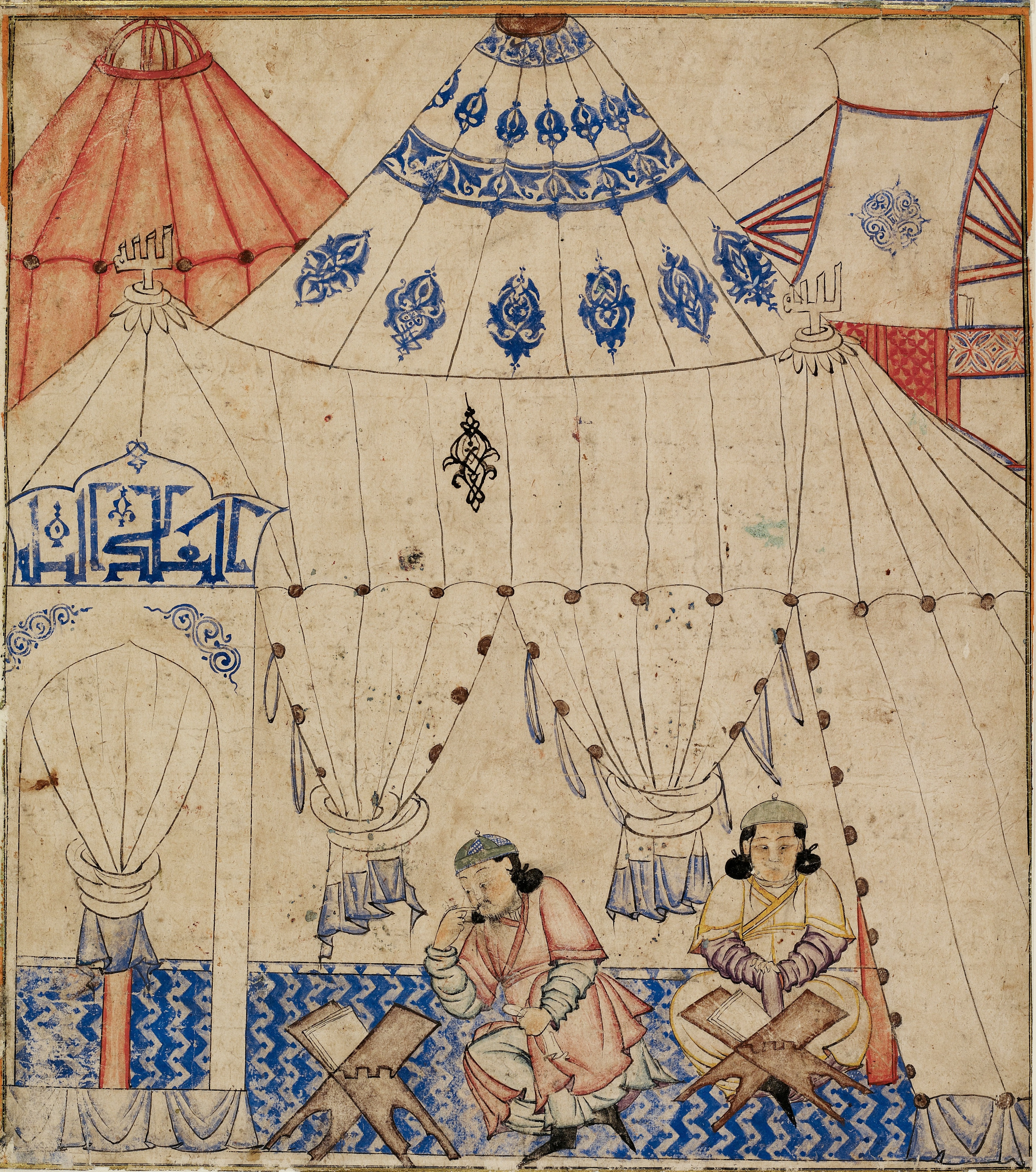
The Mongol ruler Ghazan, studying the Qur'an

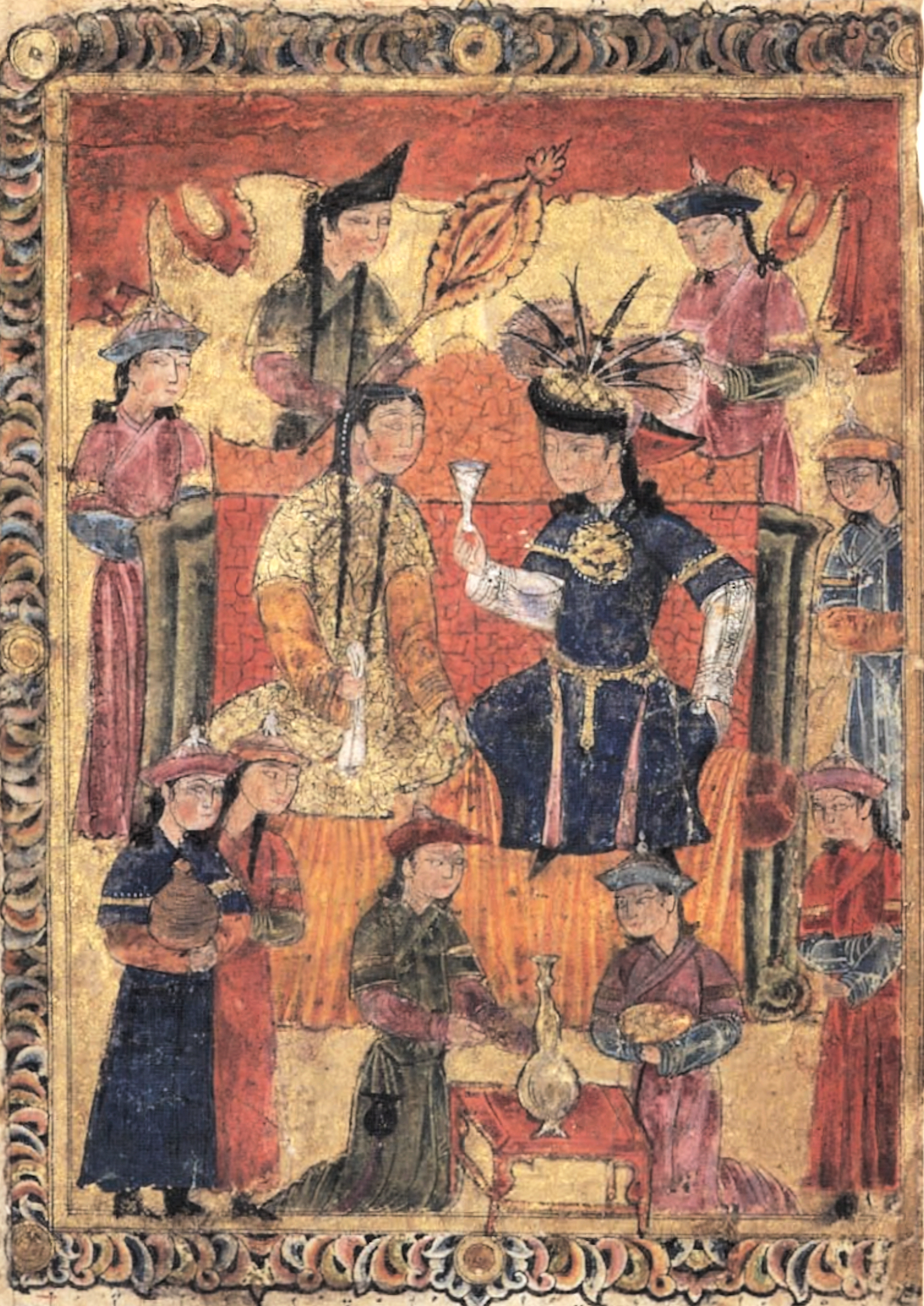
Ilkhanid court scene. The Free Man's Companion to the Niceties of Poems, left frontispiece, 1341, probably Isfahan.

The Ilkhanate started crumbling under the reign of Arghun's brother, Gaykhatu. The majority of Mongols converted to Islam while the Mongol court remained Buddhist. Gaykhatu had to buy the support of his followers and as a result, ruined the realm's finances. His vizir Sadr-ud-Din Zanjani tried to bolster the state finances by adopting paper money from the Yuan dynasty, which remained largely unsuccessful. Gaykhatu also alienated the Mongol old guard with his alleged sexual relations with a boy. Gaykhatu was overthrown in 1295 and replaced with his cousin Baydu. Baydu reigned for less than a year before he was overthrown by Gaykhatu's officer, Ghazan.

Hulegu's descendants ruled Persia for the next eighty years, tolerating multiple religions, including Shamanism, Buddhism, and Christianity, and ultimately adopting Islam as a state religion in 1295. However, despite this conversion, the Ilkhanids remained opposed to the Mamluks, who had defeated both Mongol invaders and Crusaders. The Ilkhanids launched several invasions of Syria, but were never able to gain and keep significant ground against the Mamluks, eventually being forced to give up their plans to conquer Syria, along with their stranglehold over their vassals the Sultanate of Rum and the Armenian kingdom in Cilicia. This was in large part due to civil war in the Mongol Empire and the hostility of the khanates to the north and east. The Chagatai Khanate in Moghulistan and the Golden Horde threatened the Ilkhanate in the Caucasus and Transoxiana, preventing expansion westward. Even under Hulegu's reign, the Ilkhanate was engaged in open warfare in the Caucasus with the Mongols in the Russian steppes. On the other hand, the China-based Yuan dynasty was an ally of the Ilkhanate and also held nominal suzerainty over the latter (the Emperor being also Great Khan) for many decades.

Ghazan converted to Islam under influence of Nawrūz and made Islam the official state religion. Christian and Jewish subjects lost their equal status and had to pay the jizya (minority religion tax). Ghazan gave Buddhists the starker choice of conversion or expulsion and ordered their temples to be destroyed; though he later relaxed this severity. After Nawrūz was deposed and killed in 1297, Ghazan made religious intolerance punishable and attempted to restore relations with non-Muslims.

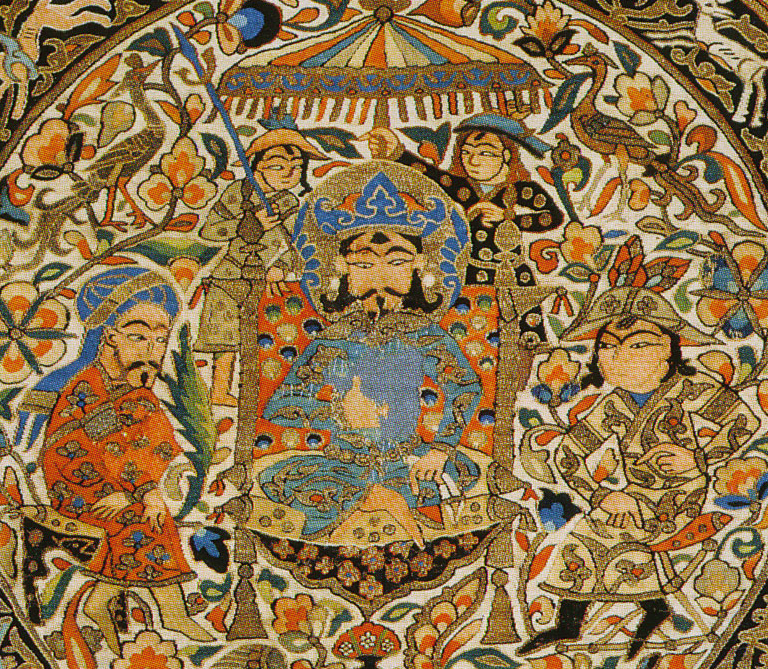
Circular piece of silk with enthroned Mongol ruler, with enturbaned assistant and beardless Mongol warrior. Iran or Iraq, early 14th century. Silk, cotton and gold.

In terms of foreign relations, the Ilkhanids' conversion to Islam had little to no effect on its hostility towards other Muslim states, and conflict with the Mamluks for control of Syria continued. The Battle of Wadi al-Khaznadar, also known as the Third Battle of Homs, was the only major victory by the Mongols over the Mamluk Sultanate, ended the latter's control over Syria for a few months.

For the most part, Ghazan's policies continued under his brother Öljaitü despite suggestions that he might begin to favor Twelver Shi'ism after he came under the influence of the theologians al-Allama al-Hilli and al-Bahrani.

Öljeitü, who had been baptised in Christianity as an infant and had flirted with Buddhism, eventually became a Hanafi Sunni, though he still retained some residual shamanism. In 1309–10, he became a Shi'ite Muslim. An Armenian scribe in 1304 noted the death of "benevolent and just" Ghazan, who was succeeded by Khar-Banda Öljeitü, "who too, exhibits good will to everyone." A colophon from 1306 reports the conversion of Mongols to Islam and "they coerce everyone into converting to their vain and false hope. They persecute, they molest, and torment," including "insulting the cross and the church". Some of the Buddhists who survived Ghazan's assaults made an unsuccessful attempt to bring Öljeitü back into Buddhism, showing they were active in the realm for more than 50 years.

The conversion of Mongols was initially a fairly superficial affair. The process of establishment of Islam did not happen suddenly. Öljeitü's historian Qāshāni records that Kutlushah, after losing patience with a dispute between Hanafi and Shafi'i Sunnis, expressed his view that Islam should be abandoned and Mongols should return to the ways of Genghis Khan. Qāshani also stated that Öljeitü had reverted for a brief period. As Muslims, Mongols showed a marked preference for Sufism, with masters like Safi-ad-Din Ardabili often treated with respect and favour.

=== Disintegration (1316–1357) ===
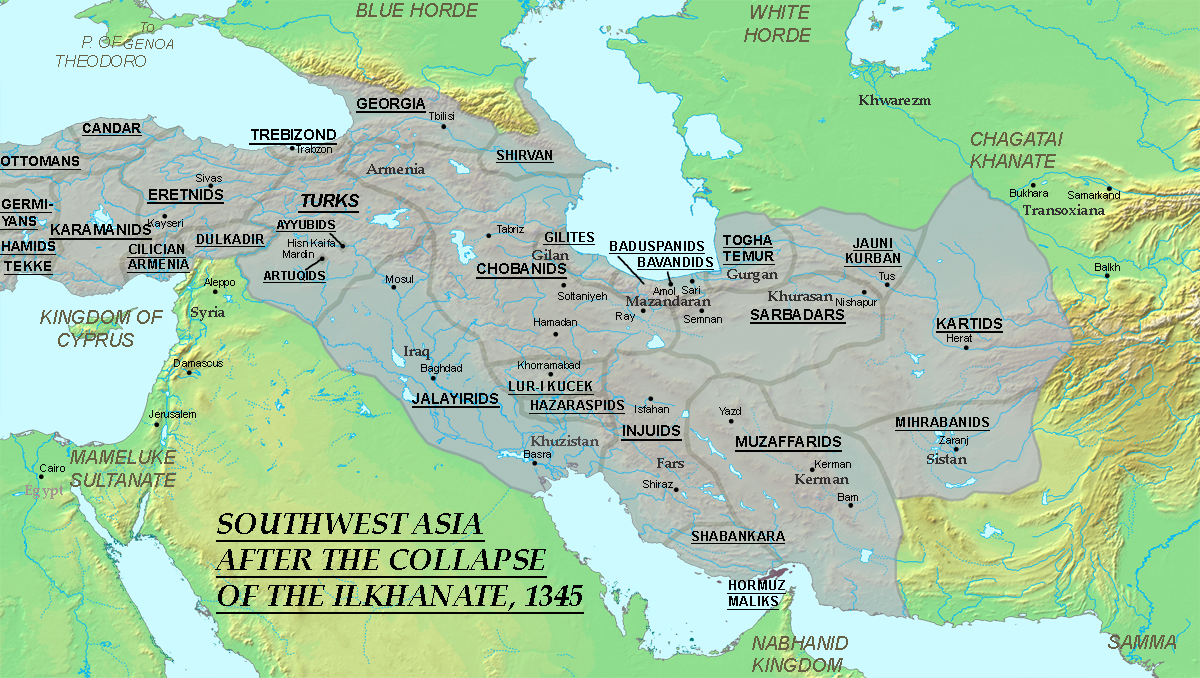
West Asia in 1345, ten years after the death of Abu Sa'id. The Jalayirids, Chobanids, Muzaffarids, Injuids, Sarbadars, and Kartids took the Ilkhanate's place as the major powers in Iran.

Öljaitü's son, the last ilkhan, Abu Sa'id Bahadur Khan, was enthroned in 1316. He was faced with rebellion in 1318 by the Chagatayids and Qara'unas in Khorasan, and an invasion by the Golden Horde at the same time. An Anatolian emir, Irenchin, also rebelled. Irenchin was crushed by Chupan of the Taichiud in the Battle of Zanjan-Rud on 13 July 1319. Under the influence of Chupan, the Ilkhanate made peace with the Chagatais, who helped them crush the Chagatayid revolt, and the Mamluks. In 1327, Abu-Sai'd replaced Chupan with "Big" Hasan. Hasan was accused of attempting to assassinate the khan and exiled to Anatolia in 1332. The non-Mongol emirs Sharaf-ud-Din Mahmud-Shah and Ghiyas-ud-Din Muhammad were given unprecedented military authority, which irked the Mongol emirs. In the 1330s, outbreaks of the Black Death ravaged the Ilkhanate and both Abu-Sai'd and his sons were killed by 1335 by the plague. Ghiyas-ud-Din put a descendant of Ariq Böke, Arpa Ke'un, on the throne, triggering a succession of short-lived khans until "Little" Hasan took Azerbaijan in 1338. In 1357, Jani Beg of the Golden Horde conquered Chupanid-held Tabriz for a year, putting an end to the Ilkhanate remnant.

== The title Ilkhan ==
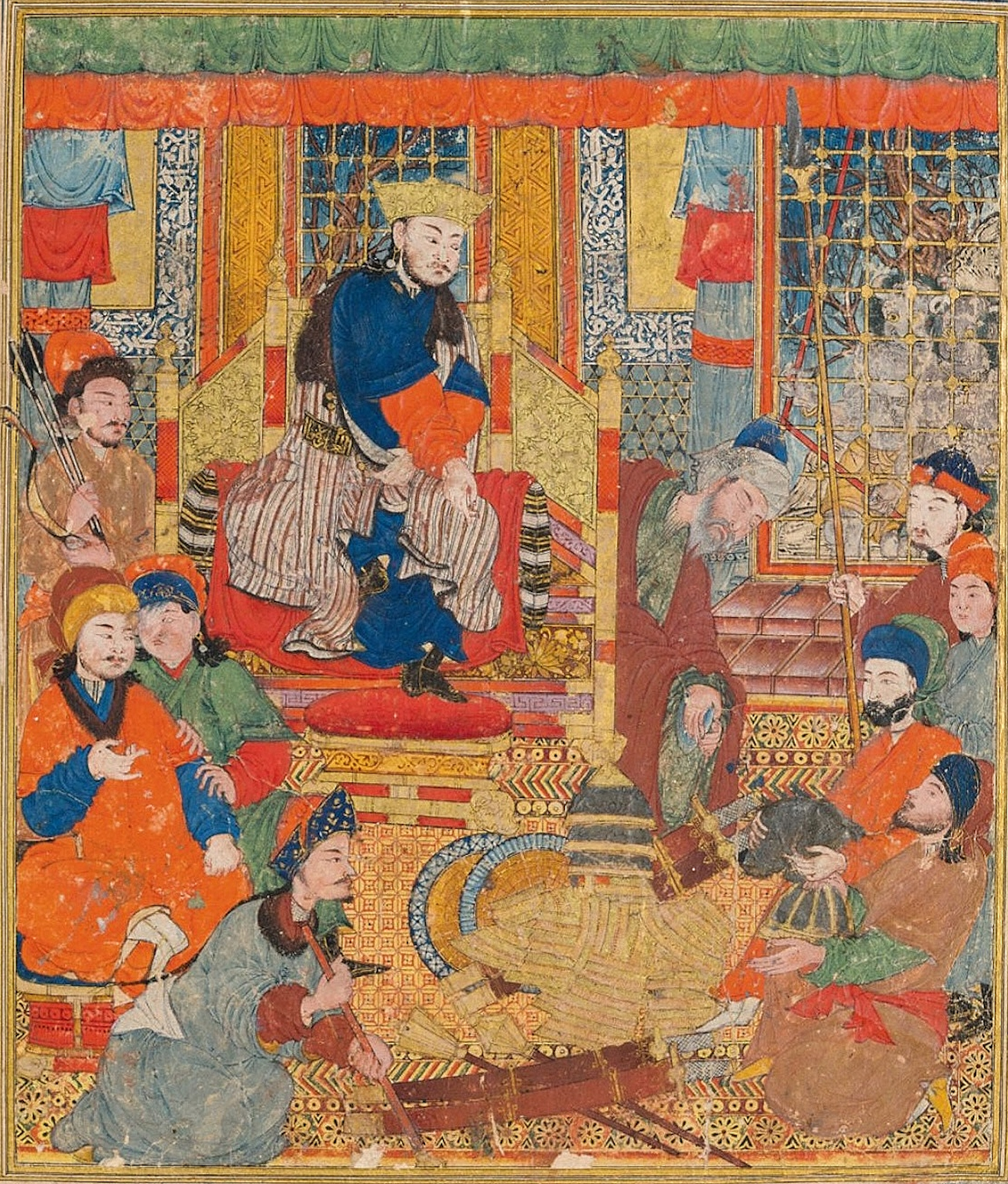
Contemporary depiction of the Il-Khanid court, in a scene of the Great Mongol Shahnamah. Tabriz or Baghdad, 1325-1335. Possibly intended to show Abaqa Khan at the Il-Khanid palace of Takht-e Soleyman.

According to the historian Rashid al-Din Hamadani, Kublai Khan granted Hülegü the title Ilkhan after he became the sole Qaghan (Great Khan) of the Mongols, by assigning the governorship of "the lands of the Tajiks [Arabs and Persians] from the banks of the Oxus to the river of Egypt" to Hülegü. Qubilai evidently sent 30,000 Mongol soldiers to reinforce Hülegü's authority in Iran. The term Ilkhan is a combination of two words: (1) Il (or El), which means "people" in Turkic and "the whole people" or "that particular" in Mongolian and (2) the khan which means 'king' or 'sovereign'. This title refers to the deference to Khublai and his successors as Great Khans of the Mongol Empire. The title Ilkhan carried by the descendants of Hülegü and, later, other Borjigin princes in the Middle East, does not appear in the sources until after 1260. All Ilkhans from Hülegü to Ghazan minted coins in "the name of the Qaghan". Ghazan omitted the name of the Great Khan from his coins, however, his coins from Georgia inscribed the traditional Mongolian formula "Struck by Ghazan in the Name of the Qaghan [Great Khan]". Ghazan also received an imperial seal, declaring him a prince from the sixth Great Khan Temür Khan.

In a 1290 letter sent to Pope Nicholas IV, Arghun called himself Ilkhan [Il qan in Mongolian]. The continued use of the title "Ilkhan" outside of the Mongol coinage in Iran suggests that Ghazan and his Muslim successors still carried the title in the fourteenth century. Indeed, Öljaitü and Abu Sa'id held the title of Ilkhan along with their Islamic, Mongolian and Persian titles.

The State of the Ilkhanate was known as the ulus of Hülegü to the Mongols during that time. Kublai Khan and his successors regarded the Ilkhans as subordinate rulers, a view corroborated by Persian sources, which note that the Great Khans issued edicts and patents of authority to confirm the coronation of Ilkhans such as Abagha and Arghun. In the official History of the Yuan dynasty, the Ilkhans are termed "Prince of the Blood" or "Imperial Prince". The Yuan rulers conferred upon the Ilkhan's great commanders and viziers (ministers) prestigious titles such as Chancellor, the Minister of the Branch Office of the Revenue Ministry, the Minister for Assisting Government and Pacifying People, Commander Unequalled in Honor, and Superintendent of Hermitage Bureau along with seals. For example, the Great Khan Yesün Temür (r. 1323–1328) granted the Ilkhanid great commander Chupan the prestigious title "vice-grand minister for establishing the governance" and the noble rank of Duke of Yi, along with a golden tablet and a seal. Chupan used the seal to stamp official documents. To reinforce their authority, both Kublai and his successor Temür dispatched their own agents, including Bolad, Qadan, and Baiju, to Iran to oversee and influence Ilkhanid politics.

In his letter dispatched to Philip IV of France in 1305, the Il-Khan Öljaitü addressed only Temür with the title Qaghan (Great Khan) and treated other Chinggisid khans of the Golden Horde and Central Asia as his equals.

== Government ==
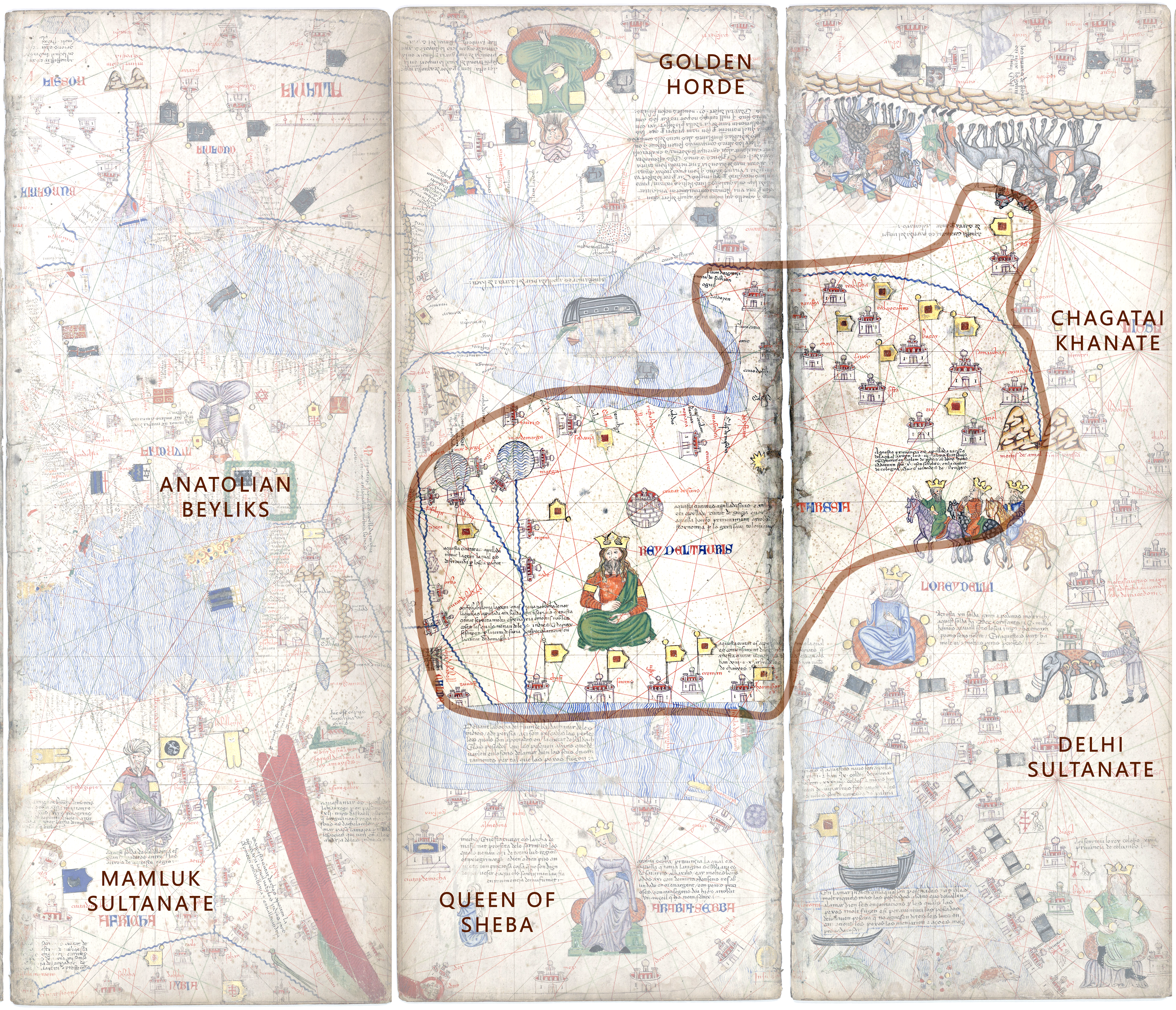
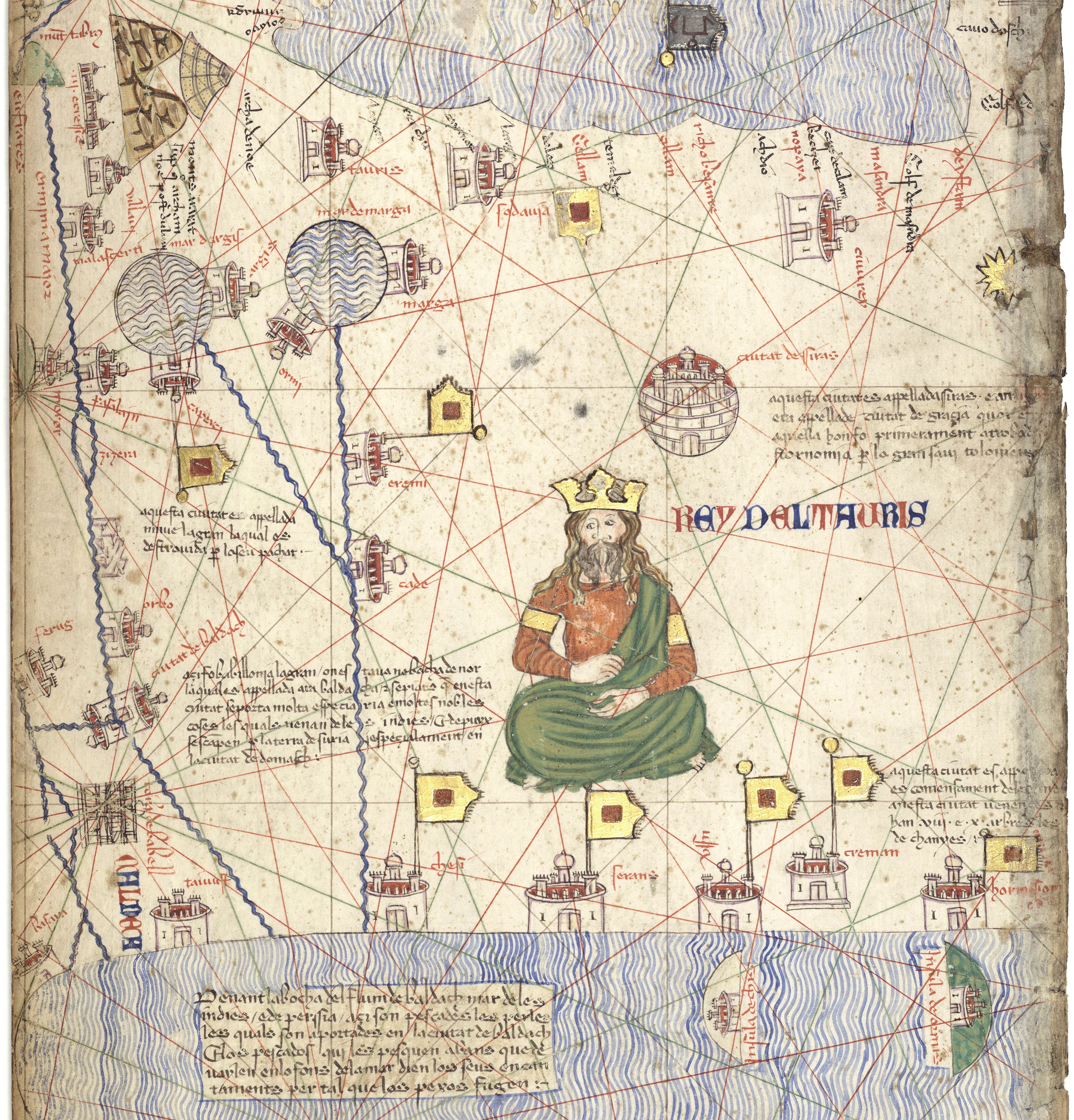
Map from the Catalan Atlas of 1375, with possible depiction of the Ilkhan and the cities of the former Ilkhanate marked by a flag:

In contrast to the China-based Yuan dynasty, who excluded the native population from gaining control of high offices, the Ilkhanids ruled their realm through a Central Asian–Persian ("Tajik") administration in partnership with Turco-Mongol military officers. Not all of the Persian administrators were Muslims or members of the traditional families that had served the Seljuqs and Khwarazmians (e.g., the Juvayni family). For example, the Ilkhanate vizier from 1288 to 1291 was Sa'ad al-Dawla, a Jew, while the prominent vizier and historian Rashid-al-Din Hamadani was a Jewish convert to Islam.

The Ilkhanid rulers, who were keen to increase their autonomy, supported their Persian bureaucrats' promotion of the traditional Iranian idea of kingship. The Persian concept of monarchy over a territorial empire, or more specifically, the "Kingship of the Land of Iran" (pādshāhi-ye Irān-zamin), was easily sold to their Mongol masters by these bureaucrats. A lasting effect of the Mongol conquests was the emergence of the "national state" in Iran during the Ilkhanate era.

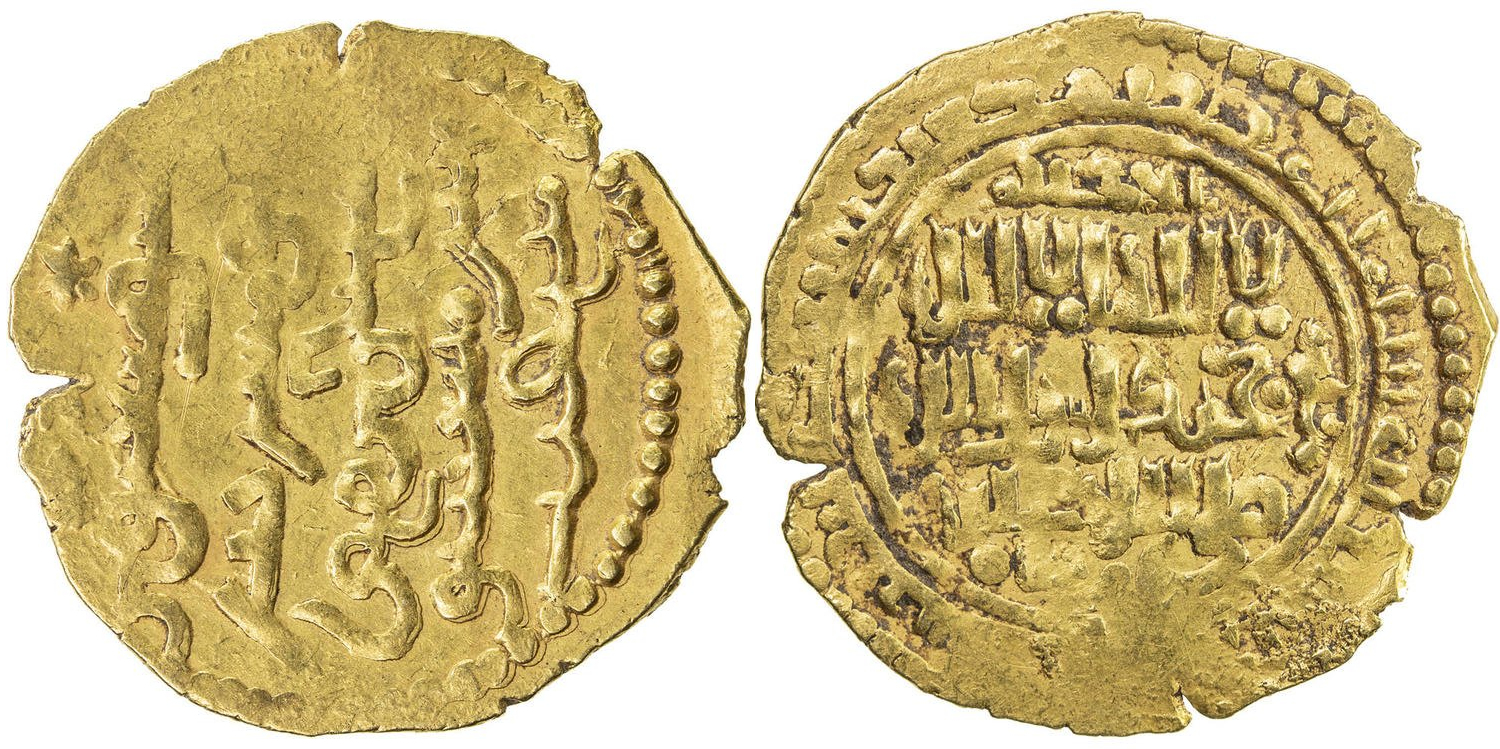
Gold dinar of Abaqa Khan with Islamic legends in Arabic and Imperial legends in Middle Mongolian

The Ilkhanate Mongols remained nomadic in their way of life until the end of the dynasty. Their nomadic routes covered central Iraq, northwest Iran, Azerbaijan, and Armenia. The Mongols administered Iraq, the Caucasus, and western and southern Iran directly with the exception of Georgia, the Artuqid sultan of Mardin, and Kufa and Luristan. The Qara'unas Mongols ruled Khorasan as an autonomous realm and did not pay taxes. Herat's local Kart dynasty also remained autonomous. Anatolia was the richest province of the Ilkhanate, supplying a quarter of its revenue while Iraq and Diyarbakir together supplied about 35 percent of its revenue.

In 1330, the annexation of Abkhazia resulted in the reunification of the Kingdom of Georgia. However, tribute received by the Il-Khans from Georgia sank by about three-quarters between 1336 and 1350 because of wars and famines.

== Diplomacy ==
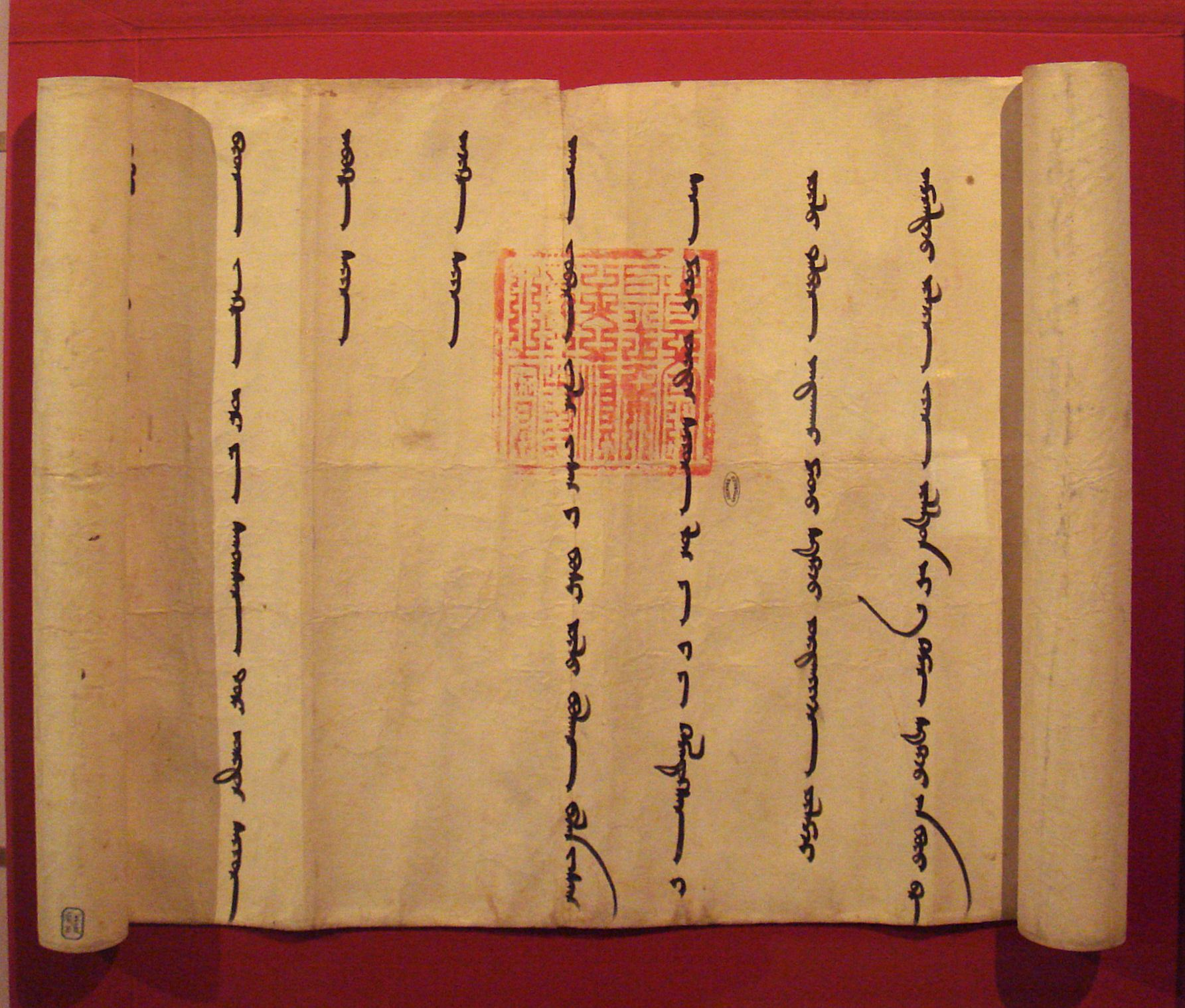
A 1305 letter from the Mongol Ilkhan Öljaitü to King Philip IV of France suggesting military collaboration, on a roll measuring 302 cm × 50 cm (9.91 ft × 1.64 ft). It also bears the Chinese seal and describes the Yuan dynasty as possessing the Mandate of Heaven.

The courts of Western Europe made many attempts to ally with the Mongols, primarily with the Ilkhanate, in the thirteenth and fourteenth centuries, starting from around the time of the Seventh Crusade in the mid-13th century. (Western Europeans were collectively called 'Franks' – ''Farang', 'Faranji' – by Muslims and Asians in the era of the Crusades.) Despite their shared opposition to the Muslims, primarily the Mamluk Sultanate, no formal alliance ever was concluded.

While Abu Sa'id eventually concluded a peace treaty with the Mamluks in 1322, the rivalry between the two powers continued diplomatically. Abu Sa'id, as a Muslim ruler, sought to demonstrate his legitimacy further abroad in Islamic terms, particularly through efforts to exert influence over the two holy cities of Islam, Mecca and Medina. Even prior to the peace treaty's conclusion, the Ilkhan began sending large and richly equipped pilgrimage (hajj) caravans from Iraq. In 1330 he went so far as to include, at great cost, an elephant in the caravan. He also arranged for his name to be read aloud in the khutba (Friday sermon) in Medina for a time in 1318 and sent the kiswa (the ceremonial cloth covering the Kaaba) to Mecca in 1319. In 1325, Chupan undertook the pilgrimage and sponsored repairs to the water supply in Mecca and the construction of a madrasa (college) and a hammam (bathhouse) in Medina. These actions challenged the primacy of the Mamluks in the Hejaz and provoked the Mamluk sultan, al-Nasir Muhammad, into repeatedly reasserting his dominance in the region by sponsoring his own works there, by purging or replacing local officials, and by undertaking the hajj pilgrimage himself.

The Ilkhanid chancery retained important features of the documentary traditions of the wider Mongol Empire. Mongolian was used at the upper levels of the Ilkhanid administration, while Mongolian, Turkic, Persian and Arabic were employed in official documents. Ilkhanid documents shared formulae and structural conventions with documents produced elsewhere in the Mongol Empire.

The Ilkhanate also employed seals based on practices shared with the Yuan administration. Some Chinese-inscribed seals used on Ilkhanid documents were received from the Yuan court. These seals carried the name wangfu (Headquarters of His Royal Highness). Other seals employing Chinese inscriptions and Yuan-derived forms were produced within the Ilkhanate itself. The Ilkhan's Chinese imperial seal reads "Seal of Truly Mandated Emperor for Whom Heaven Indulges the Ten Thousand Things" (zhen ming huang di tian shun wan shi zhi bao; 真命皇帝天順萬事之寶). It was used by at least two Ilkhanid khans, Öljaitü and Abu Sa'id Bahadur Khan. Yasuhiro Yokkaichi interprets this material as evidence both of the continuing place of Yuan-derived imperial institutions in Ilkhanid documentary practice and of their adaptation within the Ilkhanate. The dragon clothing of Imperial China was used by The Ilkhanids used Chinese bureaucratic titles such as Huangdi (Emperor) due to the influence of the Yuan dynasty's Chinese derived political system. The Ilkhanids may have also worn the dragon clothing of Imperial China.

Following the general peace among the Mongol khanates in 1304, the Ilkhans recognized the nominal supremacy of the Yuan emperor in his capacity as qa'an, while the Ilkhanate remained politically autonomous.

== Culture ==
=== Literature ===
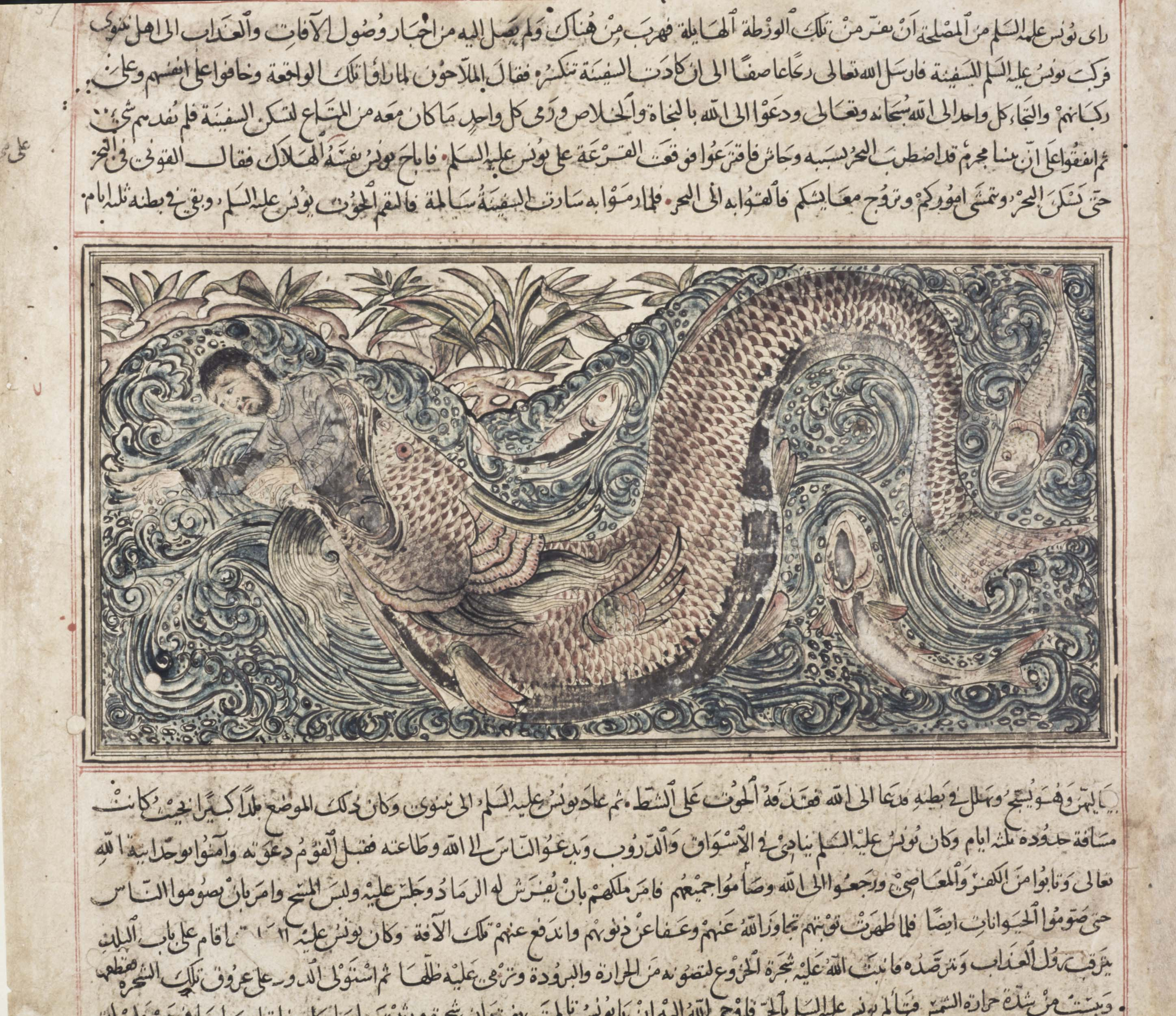
Page from a manuscript of the Jami' al-Tawarikh of Rashid al-Din (1314–15 AD, Tabriz). The illustration here depicts Jonah and the whale.

The Ilkhanid period saw the creation of numerous written works devoted to history. They were typically intended for Ilkhanid administrators or even written for a particular ruler. Many of the writers in the early period were scholars who were trained under pre-Mongol dynasties but received patronage under the new regime. The most famous work of this time is the Jami' al-tawarikh ('Compendium of Histories') of Rashid al-Din, initially commissioned by Ghazan but presented to Öljeitü upon its completion in 1307. Its first surviving volume is a history of the Mongol dynasty while the second is a history of the Iranian and Islamic world, along with stories of other cultures. Ghazan also patronized Abu al-Qasim Qashani, who composed the Ta'rikh-i Uljaytu ('History of Öljeitü'), and Shihab al-Din Waṣṣaf, who wrote the Tajziyat al-amṣar wa-tazjiyat al-a'ṣar ('The Allocation of Cities and Propulsion of Epochs'). The latter was intended as a continuation of Ala' al-Din Juvayni's slightly earlier work, Tārikh-i jahangusha ('History of the World Conqueror') which narrates the fall of the Khwarazmian Empire and the rise of the Mongol Empire. Various other works were also commissioned.

The later years of the Ilkhanate were also marked by interest in the Shahnameh, the Iranian epic by 11th-century poet Firdowsi. Not only were new copies of the work produced, but it also inspired new historical works that copied its style and format, such as those of Hamdallah Mustawfi.

=== Arts ===
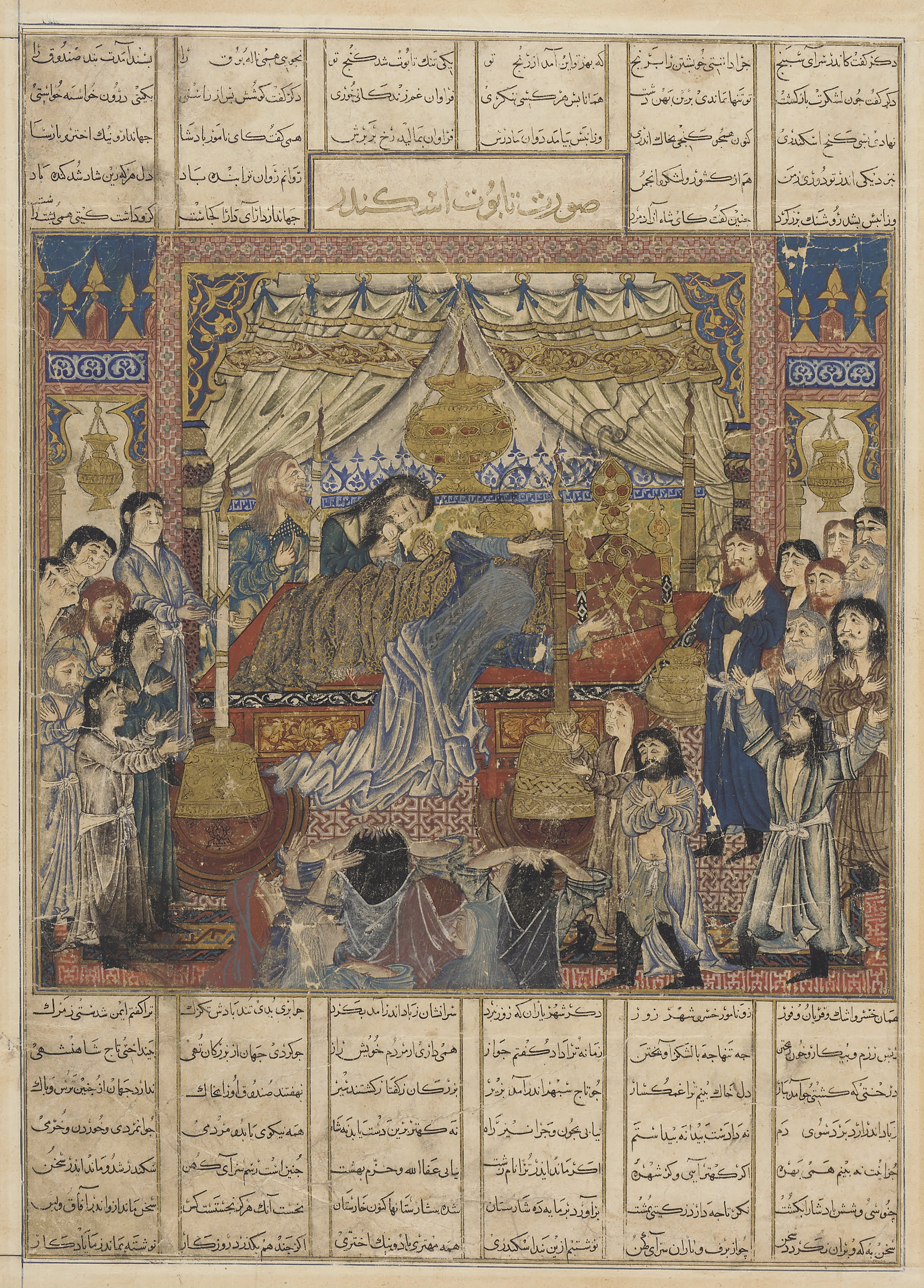
A page from the Great Mongol Shahnameh (early 14th century), with a miniature painting illustrating mourners gathered around the body of Alexander the Great

Among the arts patronized by the Ilkhans, the most important were the arts of the book. The major centers of manuscript production and illumination were Mosul and Baghdad in Iraq. They matched the quality of contemporary production in the Mamluk Sultanate and may have influenced the latter, as there are artistic similarities between Mamluk and Ilkhanid manuscripts. One notable development in this period is the production of manuscripts with very large pages, up to 70 by 50 centimetres (28 in × 20 in) in size, with accordingly large scripts, particularly in muhaqqaq style. Illustrations were common and are found in works on a variety of topics such as history, nature, religion, and astronomy. Among these was also an increased production of copies of the Shahnameh. The most celebrated copy is the Great Mongol Shahnameh, a large manuscript probably produced for Abu Sa'id in the 14th century. Its pages include highly expressive illustrations that reflect influences from across Eurasia, including China and Europe. Some two dozen large-scale Qur'ans have survived and are among the most impressive artistically produced Qur'ans created up to this point. They were each produced over many years – one of the smaller examples from Baghdad took four years to transcribe and eight years to decorate – and feature elaborate multi-coloured frontispieces with geometric designs similar to those seen in Ilkhanid architecture such as the Sultaniyya Mausoleum.

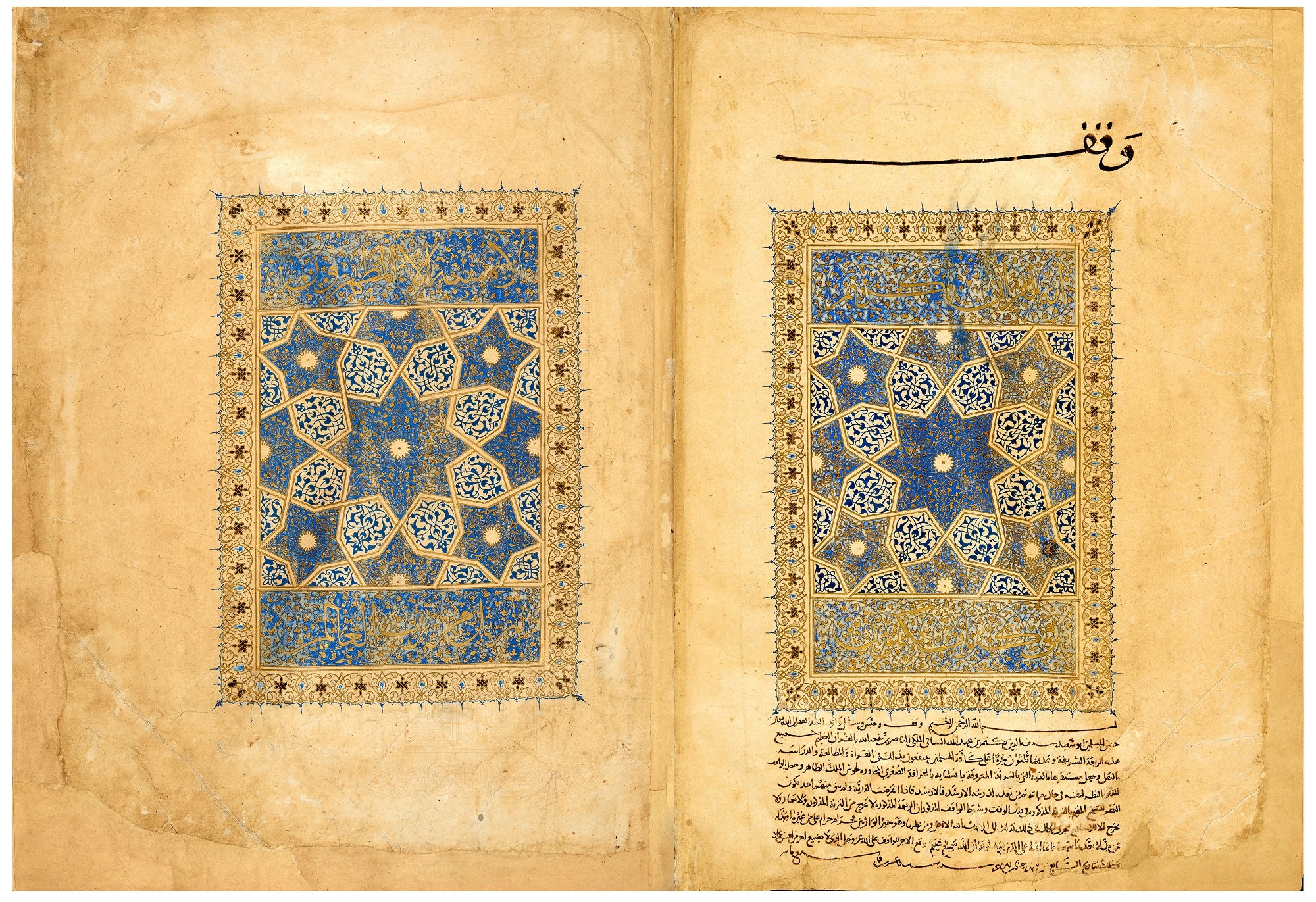
Double frontispiece for a Qur'an commissioned by Öljeitü and completed in 1313 in Hamadan

High-quality silk textiles were also produced under the Ilkhanids. The most important surviving example – possibly the only one definitively attributable to the Ilkhanate – is the large fragment of a burial robe for Duke Rudolf IV of Austria (d. 1365), which was made from an Iranian import. The textile was originally manufactured in an Ilkhanid state workshop, most likely in Tabriz, and bears the name and titles of Abu Sa'id after 1319. It is woven in lampas and compound weaves in tan and red colours, with gold wefts. It features a motif of broad alternating bands: one set of stripes is filled with a repeating pattern of rhomboids and ornate medallions with vegetal motifs and peacocks in between them, while the other stripes are filled with large epigraphic inscriptions in Arabic script. Between these are narrower bands filled with other animals. The use of this piece for a royal funerary shroud in Europe suggests that Iranian textiles were still highly prized abroad during this period.

In metalwork, Ilkhanid productions were often larger and more richly decorated than earlier Iranian works. Major centers of production included Tabriz and Shiraz. Surviving pieces are often made of brass inlaid with copper, a type known in previous periods, as well as brass inlaid with gold, a newer trend used for more costly court objects. Among these examples is the base of the largest preserved candlestick from Islamic-era Iran, commissioned by one of Öljeitü's viziers in 1308–09 and measuring 32.5 centimetres (13 in) high. Objects in gold and silver were likely also important but no examples have survived.

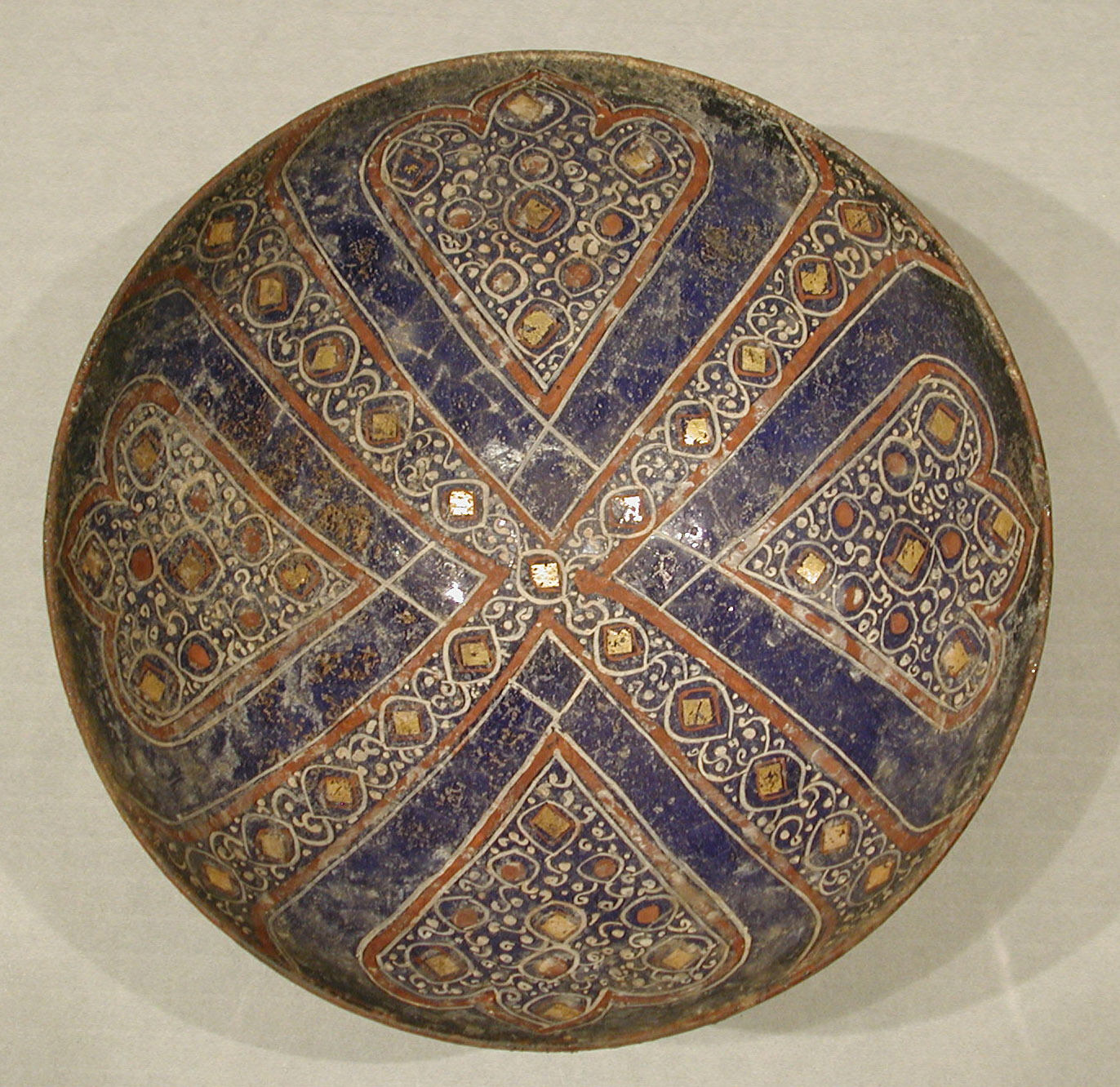
A bowl in the lajvardina technique, produced in Ilkhanid Iran, late 13th or early 14th century

Ceramic production was of good quality but not as fine and as diverse as pottery from the preceding century. The type most commonly attributed to Ilkhanid Iran is the so-called "Sultanabad" ceramics. These were made of a softer white paste with a green or gray-brown slip. Bowls of this type were typically underglaze-painted with animal figures with a background of leaves. Kashan remained an important center of lustreware production until the late 13th century, although it ceased producing ceramic vessels after 1284 and then produced only tiles until 1340. The designs were less accomplished than in previous periods but they started to incorporate new Chinese-inspired motifs such as lotuses and simurghs. Starting around the 1270s or 1280s, a new style of expensive ceramic started to be produced, known as lajvardina, from the Persian word for lapis lazuli. These often had a deep blue or sometimes blue-ish turquoise glaze and were then overglaze-painted with red, black, white, and gold colours. These have been found at Takht-i Sulaymān and they may have replaced the pre-Mongol mina'i ceramics.

=== Architecture ===
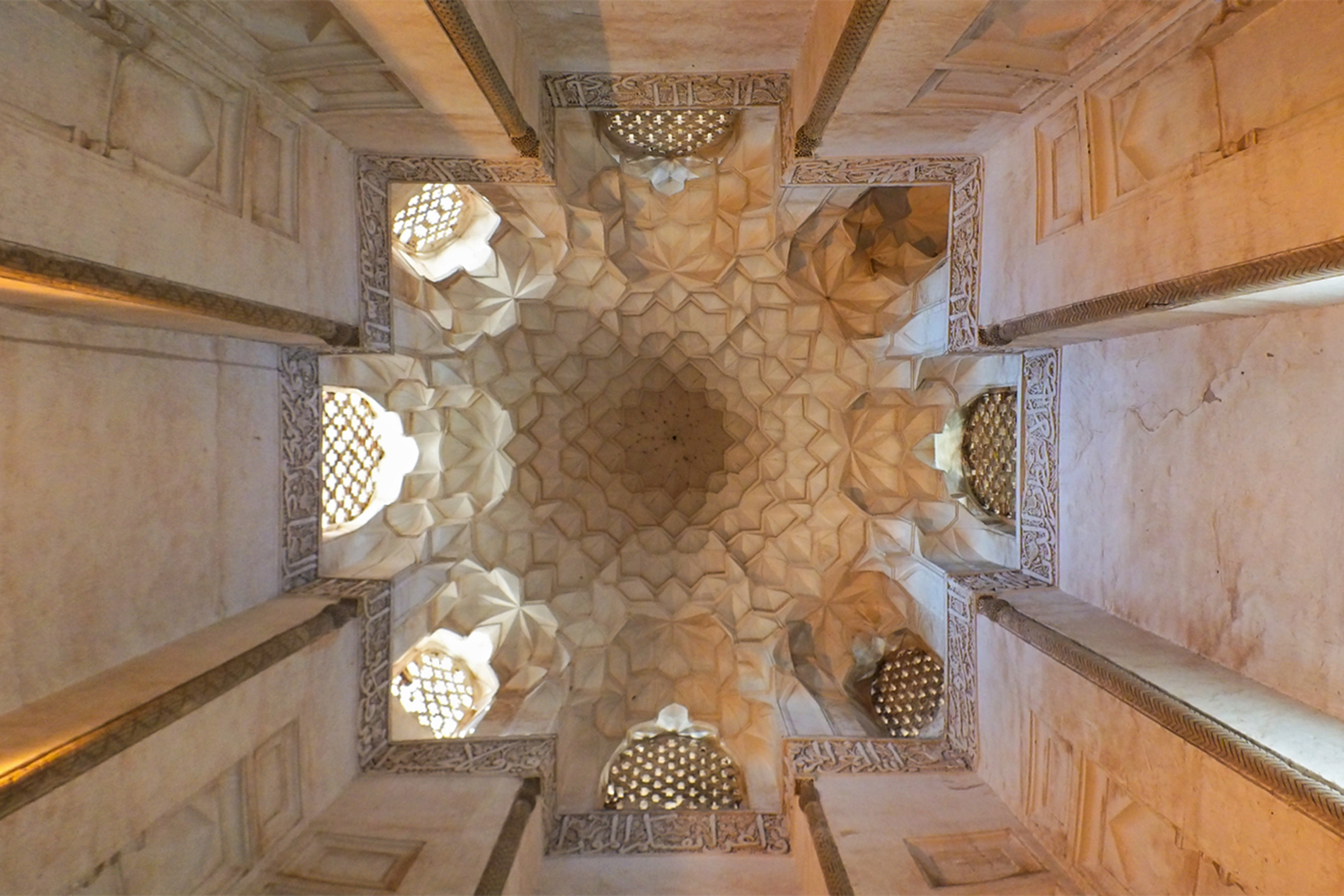
Muqarnas dome inside the Mausoleum of Shaykh 'Abd al-Samad in Natanz (1307–8)

Ilkhanid architecture elaborated earlier Iranian traditions. In particular, greater attention was given to interior spaces and how to organize them. Rooms were made taller, while transverse vaulting was employed and walls were opened with arches, thus allowing more light and air inside. Muqarnas, which was previously confined to covering limited transitional elements like squinches, was now used to cover entire domes and vaults for purely decorative effect. The Tomb of 'Abd al-Samad in Natanz (1307–8), for example, is covered inside by an elaborate muqarnas dome that is made from stucco suspended below the pyramidal vault that roofs the building. Brick remained the main construction material, but more color was added through the use of tile mosaic, which involved cutting monochrome tiles of different colors into pieces that were then fitted together to form larger patterns, especially geometric motifs and floral motifs. Under Ilkhanid rule, Tabriz became a significant hub of commerce and receiving considerable support from the Ilkhanids. By the early 1300s, Tabrizi craftsmen had developed multicolor tile mosaic, known as the Tabrizi tradition.

Various mosques were built or expanded during this period, usually following the four-iwan plan for congregational mosques (e.g. at Varamin and Kirman), except in the northwest, where cold winters discouraged the presence of an open courtyard, as at the Jameh Mosque of Ardabil (now ruined). The iwan on the qibla side (in the direction of prayer), usually led to a domed prayer hall behind. Another hallmark of the Ilkhanid period is the introduction of monumental mosque portals topped by twin minarets, as seen at the Jameh Mosque of Yazd.

Due to increased contact between Yuan China and Ilkhanate Persia, some monuments display motifs inspired by Chinese art or executed by Chinese craftspeople. The "Dāsh Kasan" near Soltaniyeh, for example, juxtaposes relief carvings of Chinese dragons and flanking niches with muqarnas decorations, leadings scholars to speculate on the Buddhist or Islamic possibilities of its religious use.

== Legacy ==
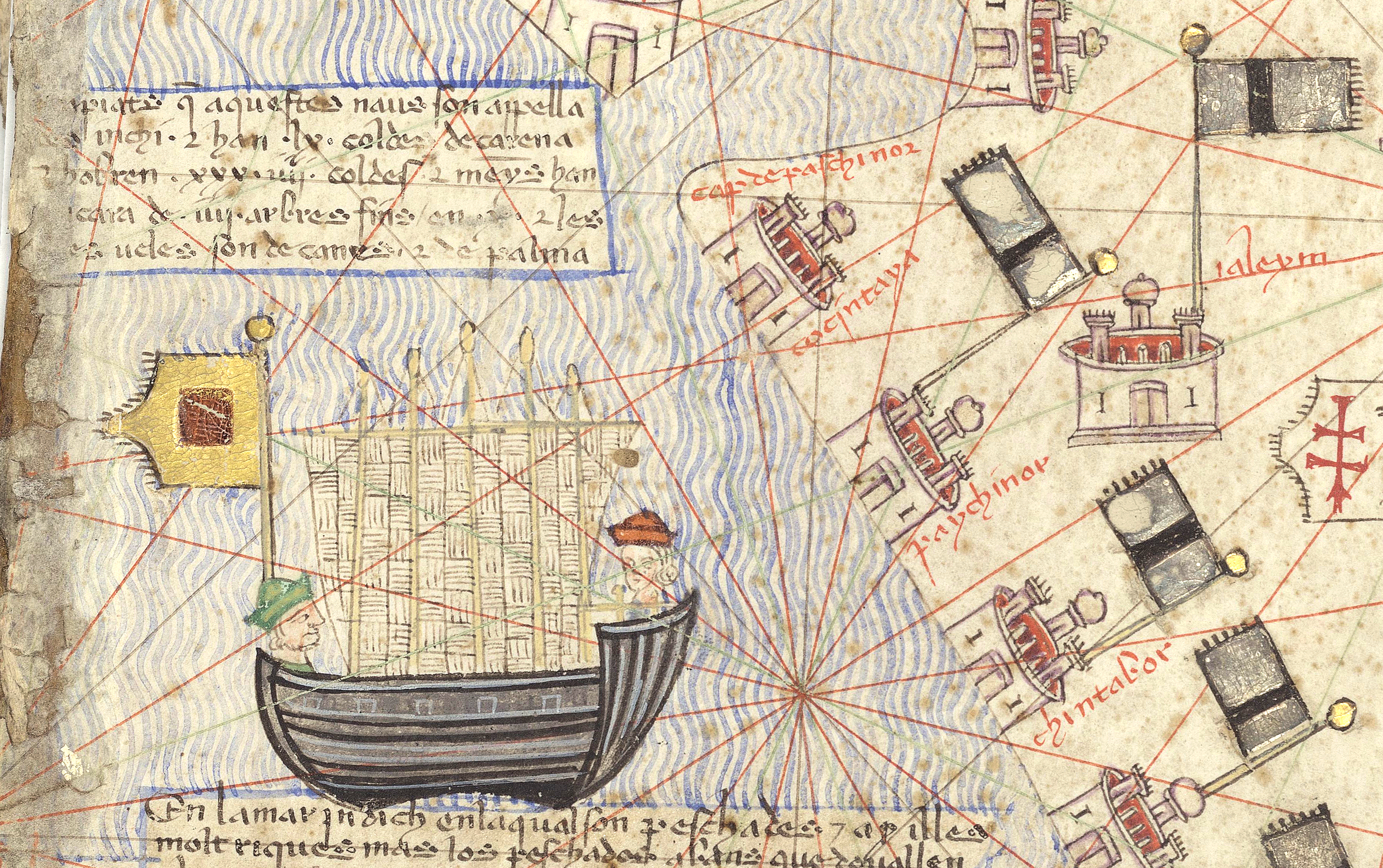
A ship under the Ilkhanate flag, sailing the Indian Ocean towards the coast of India under the control of the Delhi Sultanate, in the Catalan Atlas (1375).

The emergence of the Ilkhanate had an important historical impact in West Asia. The establishment of the unified Mongol Empire had significantly eased trade and commerce across Asia. The communications between the Ilkhanate and the Yuan dynasty headquartered in China encouraged this development. The dragon clothing of Imperial China was used by the Ilkhanids, the Chinese Huangdi (Emperor) title was used by the Ilkhanids due to heavy influence upon the Mongols of the Chinese system of politics. Seals with Chinese characters were created by the Ilkhanids themselves besides the seals they received from the Yuan dynasty which contain references to a Chinese government organization.

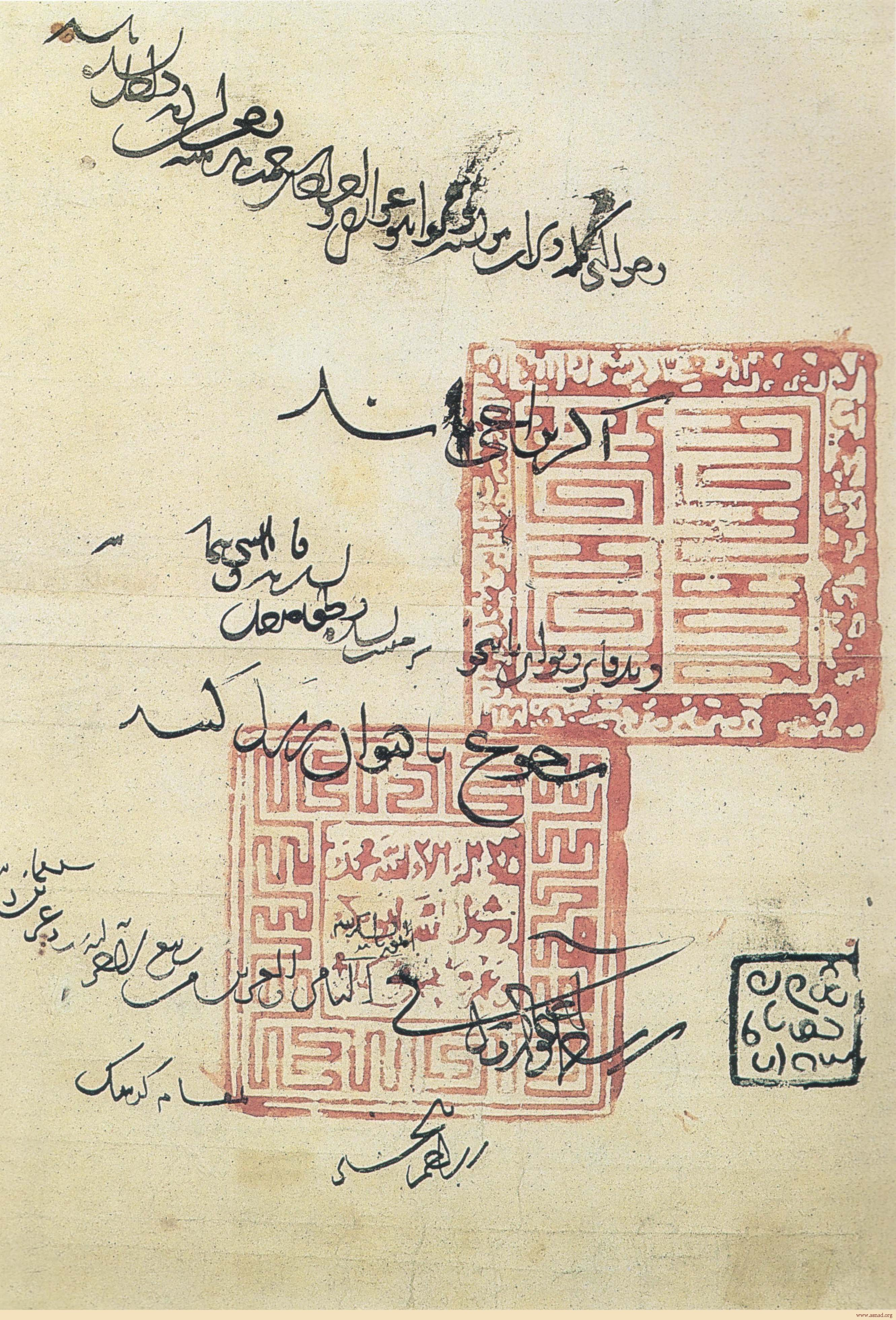
Abu Sa'id Bahadur Khan's Imperial edict (Firman) in Persian language with two bilingual East Asian-style seals in Chinese and Arabic.

The Ilkhanate also helped to pave the way for the later Safavid dynastic state, and ultimately the modern country of Iran. Hulegu's conquests had also opened Iran to Chinese influence from the east. This, combined with patronage from his successors, would develop Iran's distinctive excellence in architecture. Under the Ilkhans, Iranian historians also moved from writing in Arabic to writing in their native Persian tongue.

The rudiments of double-entry accounting were practiced in the Ilkhanate; merdiban was then adopted by the Ottoman Empire. These developments were independent from the accounting practices used in Europe. This accounting system was adopted primarily as the result of socio-economic necessities created by the agricultural and fiscal reforms of Ghazan Khan in 1295–1304.

=== Ilkhan as a tribal title in 19th/20th century Iran ===
The title ilkhan resurfaced among the Qashqai nomads of southern Iran in the 19th century. Jan Mohammad Khan started using it in 1818/19, and this was continued by all the following Qashqai leaders. The last Qashqai ilkhan was Nasir Khan, who in 1954 was pushed into exile after his support of Mohammad Mosaddegh. When he returned during the Islamic revolution in 1979, he could not regain his previous position and died in 1984 as the last Ilkhan of the Qashqai.

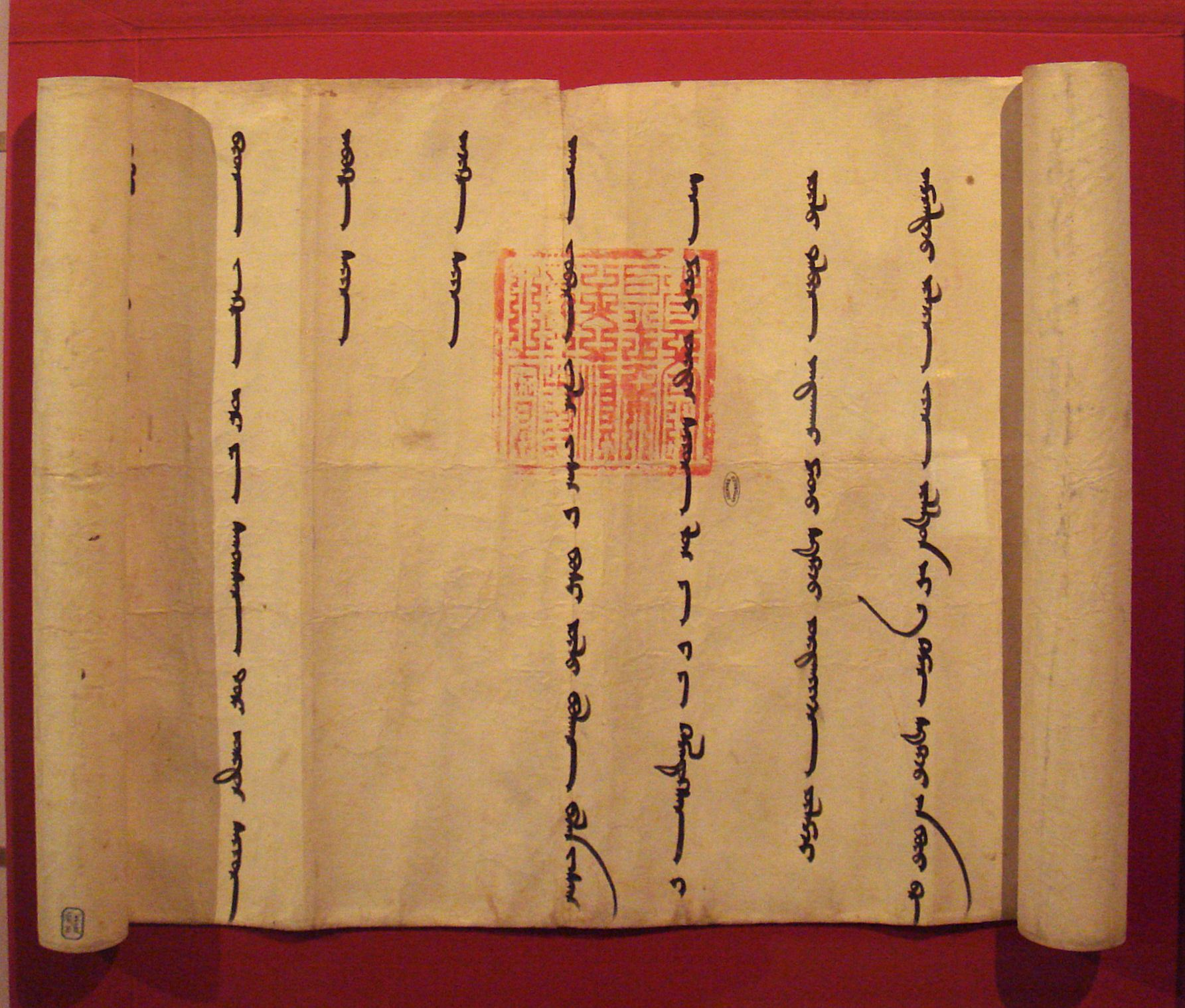
1305 letter of the Ilkhanid Mongol öljaitü (official square red stamp of the Ilkhanate).

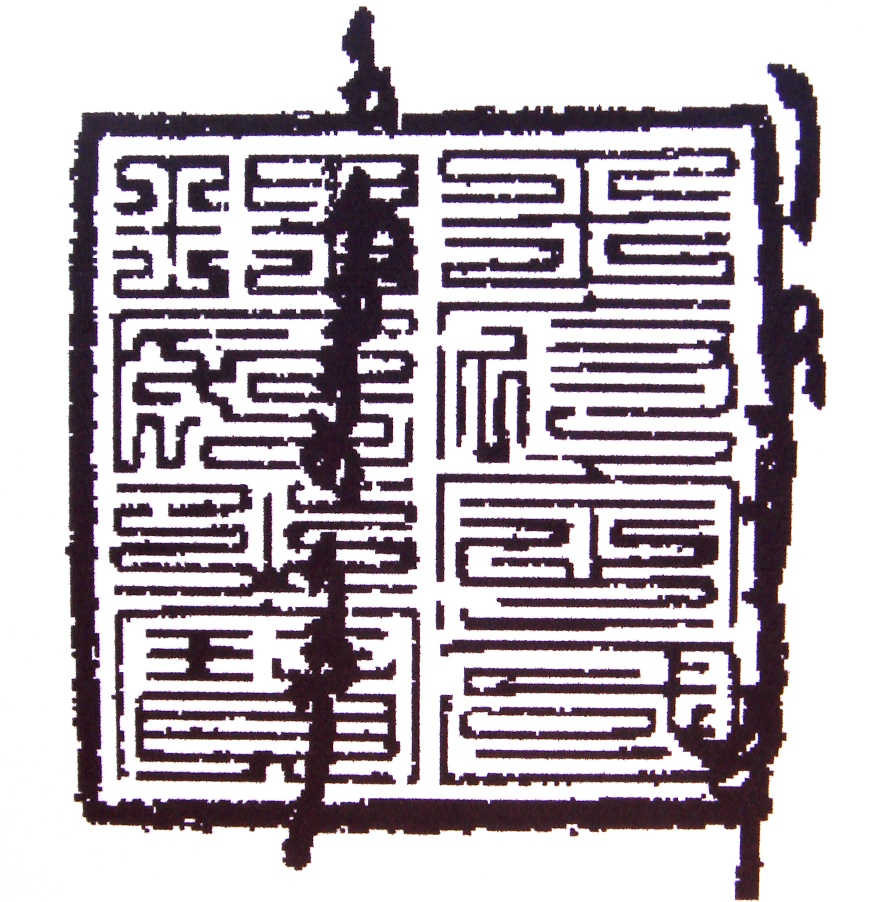
Seal of Ghazan

== Ilkhans ==
The title of Il Khan was used consistently only in the first half of the dynasty, and after the reign of Geikhatu it was rarely used, with the titles Padishah or Sultan being used instead.

=== House of Hulegu (1256–1335; Ilkhanate Mongol kings) ===
- Hulegu Khan (1256–1265)
- Abaqa Khan (1265–1282)
- Ahmad Tegüder (1282–1284)
- Arghun (1284–1291)
- Gaykhatu (1291–1295)
- Baydu (1295)
- Mahmud Ghazan (1295–1304)
- Muhammad Khodabandeh (Oljeitu or Öljaitü) (1304–1316)
- Abu Sa'id Bahadur (1316–1335)

After the death of Abu Said, the Warlords, governors and regional states raised their own candidates as claimants.

=== House of Ariq Böke ===
- Arpa Ke'ün (1335–1336)

=== House of Hulegu (1336–1357) ===
- Musa (1336–1337) (puppet of 'Ali Padshah of Baghdad)
- Muhammad (1336–1338) (Jalayirid puppet)
- Sati Beg (1338–1339) (Chobanid puppet)
- Sulayman (1339–1343) (Chobanid puppet, recognized by the Sarbadars 1341–1343)
- Jahan Temür (1339–1340) (Jalayirid puppet)
- Anushirwan (1343–1356) (Chobanid puppet)
- Ghazan II (1356–1357) (known only from coinage)

=== House of Hasar ===
Claimants from eastern Persia (Khurasan):

- Togha Temür (c. 1338–1353) (recognized by the Kartids 1338–1349; by the Jalayirids 1338–1339, 1340–1344; by the Sarbadars 1338–1341, 1344, 1353)
- Luqman (1353–1388) (son of Togha Temür and the protégé of Timur)

== Family tree (House of Hulegu) ==
Ilkhanate family tree

Temüjin (b. 1158–d. 1227)	Börte Ujin (b. 1162–d. 1230)
Tolui (b. 1193–d. 1232)	Sorghaghtani Beki (b. 1198–d. 1252)
1 Hulagu Khan (b. 1217–d. 1265); Ilkhan; 1256–1265	Doquz Khatun (d. 1265)	Ariq Böke (b. 1219–d. 1266)
3 Tekuder (b. 1233–d. 1284); Ilkhan; 1282–1284	2 Abaqa Khan (b. 1234–d. 1282); Ilkhan; 1265–1282	Taraqai	Mengu Timur	Yoshmut	Malik Temür
4 Arghun (b. 1258–d. 1292); Ilkhan; 1284–1291	5 Gaykhatu (d. 1295); Ilkhan; 1291–1295	6 Baydu (d. 1295); Ilkhan; 1295	Ambarji	Sogai	Mingqan
7 Ghazan (b. 1272–d. 1304); Ilkhan; 1295–1304	8 Öljaitü (b. 1280–d. 1316); Ilkhan; 1304–1316	Alafireng	Ali	Timur	Yusufshah	Söse
13; Sati Khatun (c. 1300–1345); Ilkhan; 1338–1339	9 Abu Sa'id (b. 1305–d. 1335); Ilkhan; 1316–1335	14; Jahan Temür; Ilkhan; 1339–1340	11; Musa (d. 1336); Ilkhan; 1336–1336	Yul Qotloq	15; Suleiman Khan; Ilkhan; 1339–1343	10; Arpa Ke'un (d. 1336); Ilkhan; 1335–1336
12; Muhammad (d. 1338); Ilkhan; 1336–1338

== Genealogy of Ulus of Hulagu ==
House of Borjigin

Mongol Empire
Il-Khanate
Astarabad Emirate
Salghurids
Qutluq-Khanids

Yisughay
Temüjin r. 1206–1227	Jochi-Qasar
Tolui r. 1227–1229	Tuqu
Hulagu r. 1256–1265	Ariq-Buqa r. 1259–1264	Ibugan
Abaqa r. 1265–1282	Yashmut	Taraghay	Tegudar r. 1282–1284	Möngke-Timur r. 1272–1282	Malik-Timur	Imugan
Arghun r. 1284–1291	Ghaykhatu r. 1291–1295	Sughay	Baydu r. 1295–1295	Kurdujin r. 1295–1295	Anbarchi	Mingqan	Baba
Ghazan I r. 1295–1304	Uljaytu r. 1304–1316	Alafrang	Yusuf-Shah	Ali	Esen-Timur	Susa	Suday
Abu Sa'id r. 1316–1335	Sati-Beg r. 1338–1339	Jahan-Timur r. 1339–1340	Sulayman r. 1339–1343	Musa r. 1336–1336	Yul-Qutluq	Arpa r. 1335–1336	Taghay-Timur r. 1336–1353
Anushirwan r. 1343–1356	Ghazan II r. 1356–1357	Muhammad r. 1336–1338	Wali r. 1353–1384	Luqman-Padishah r. 1384–1388
Bir-Padishah r. 1388–1406
Ali-Sultan r. 1406–1407

== See also ==
- Division of the Mongol Empire
- List of Mongol states
- List of medieval Mongol tribes and clans
- Full list of Iranian Kingdoms
- Sarbadars, separatist movement of the late Ilkhanid era
- Hazaras, ethnic group in today's Afghanistan
