= Buqa =

Mongolian minister in Iran

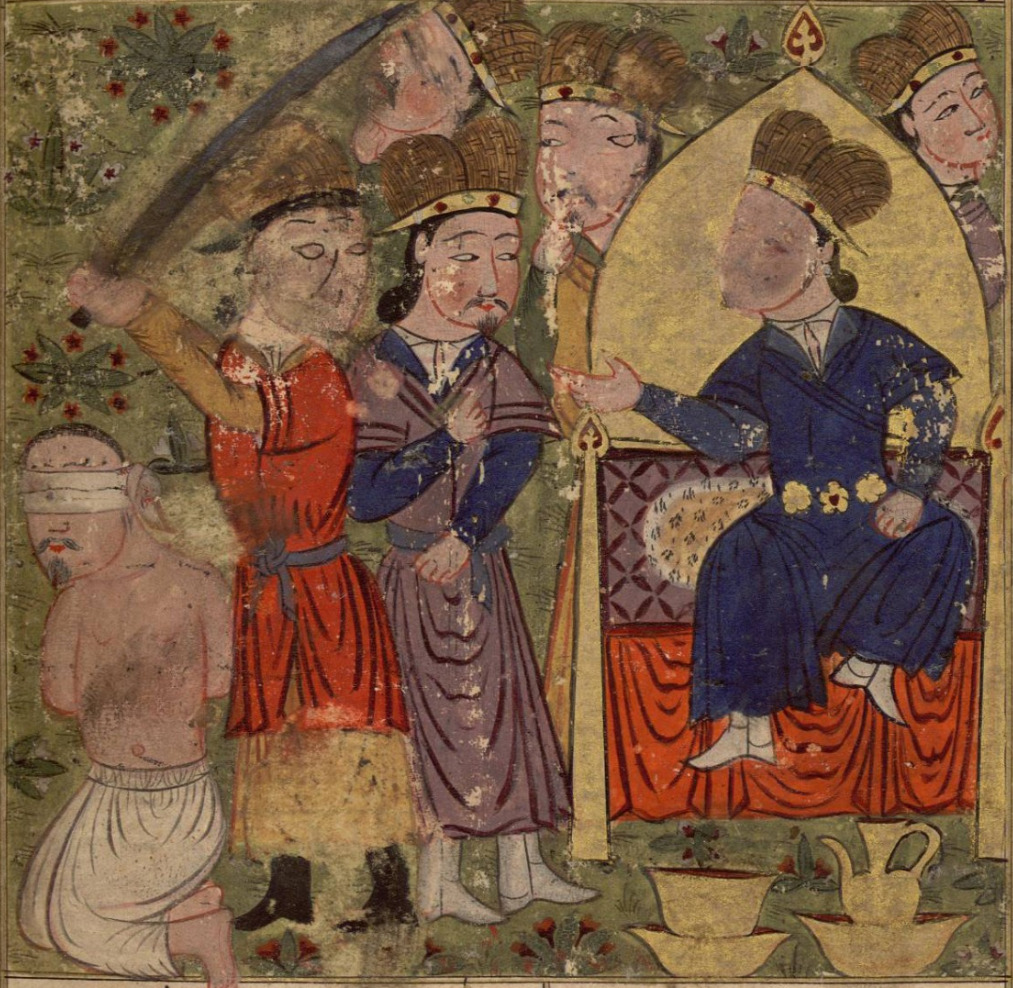
- Execution of Buqa on the orders of Arghun, 15th century

Sahib-i divan of Ilkhanate
- In office 1284–1289
- Appointed by: Arghun
- Monarch: Arghun
- Preceded by: Shams al-Din Juvayni
- Succeeded by: Sa'ad al-Dawla

Personal details
- Died: January 16, 1289

Buqa (or Bugha) (died January 16, 1289) was a Mongol lord and chancellor who was instrumental in sweeping Arghun to power as the fourth Il-Khan of Iran in 1284 and became his chief minister (vizier) and advisor, succeeding Shams ad-Din Juvayni whom Arghun had executed in October 1284. Buqa too was executed on Arghun's order in January 1289.

== Life ==
=== Childhood ===
Buqa was an orphan from the Jalayir tribe. His father was Ugulay Qurchi who accompanied Hulagu Khan as his scout. He was given to Abaqa's court alongside his brother Aruq as an orphan kid and became his follower.

=== Life under Abaqa and Tekuder ===
He served Abaqa as his trusted counselor, keeper of treasury, keeper of pelts and keeper of seal; meanwhile befriending his son Arghun. After Abaqa's death in 1282, he supported Arghun for the throne in opposition to Tekuder, however, still served him as keeper of seal after his election and became his trusted commander. During Arghun's insurrection against Tekuder in 1284, ilkhan entrusted him to collect Prince Gaykhatu as hostage from Arghun. Arghun agreed to terms and sent his brother accompanied by two amirs, including Nawruz to custody of Buqa, then most senior of Tekuder's commanders on 13 or 28 June. Buqa in turn handed over him to Ahmad who put Gaykhatu in Tödai Khatun's encampment. Despite this, Tekuder continued hostilities and kept advancing on Arghun. This made Buqa to harbor resentment towards Tekuder and grow more sympathetic to Arghun. On the other hand, he lost Tekuder's favor who started to invest his trust in Aq Buqa, another Jalair general and his cousin.

Starting to plan his coup, he broke into Arghun's captor and Tekuder's son-in-law Alinaq's camp and set Arghun free, while killing Alinaq. Tekuder fled west and looted Buqa's encampment near Sultaniya in revenge. He continued on to his own pasturelands near Takht-i Suleyman on 17 July planning to escape to Golden Horde via Derbent. However, Qaraunas sent by Buqa soon caught up with him and arrested Tekuder. He was turned over to Arghun on 26 July on Ab-i Shur pasturelands, near Maragha.

=== Life under Arghun ===
After deposition of Tekuder, Arghun became the new il-khan while Buqa succeeded Shams ad-Din Juvayni as new sahib-i divan (grand vizier) and actual ruler of the empire. He was the first person to hold both amir al-umara and sahib-i divan titles, managing both military and civil matters. Aided by his elder brother Aruq, Buqa embarked on a reform that revolutionized the monetary and fiscal structure of the empire. The Great Khan Kublai Khan rewarded Buqa the title of chingsang (Chinese: 丞相; lit. 'Chancellor') for his loyalty to the Ilkhan Arghun in 1286. To strengthen his position, he appointed his brother Aruq as governor of Baghdad (while Jumghur's son Prince Jushkab was practically his puppet) and his follower Imad ud-Din Alavi as governor-general of Fars. Another one of his associates, Tegüne Yarguchi was stationed in Anatolia with Prince Hulachu. Under his orders, Arghun's infant son Ghazan was as viceroy of Khorasan with Nawruz as his military governor.

His and Aruq's arrogance and excesses soon raised him many enemies. Aruq practically ruled Baghdad as his own appanage, not paying taxes to central government, murdering his critics. Sayyid Imad ud-Din Alavi's murder on 30 December 1284 angered Buqa to the point summoning Abish Khatun herself to his court. It was Jalal ad-Din Arqan, one of her attendants first to reveal the details of murder, after which he was sawed in half. She was ordered to pay blood money worth 700.000 dinars to Sayyed's sons as the result of court. Other emirs, including Tuladai, Taghachar and Toghan started to conspire with Arghun to depose overpowered Buqa. His first step was to investigate former non-paid Salghurid taxes. As a result, he gained over 1.5 million dinars from Fars province. His next step came in 1287, when Buqa fell ill. He investigated Aruq in same fashion and started to control Baghdad's income as well, replacing him with Ordo Qiya. Another replacement came when Buqa's ally Amir Ali was removed from governorate of Tabriz.

Perceiving that he had lost the khan's favour, Buqa organized a conspiracy in Prince Jushkab and Arghun's vassal king Demetre II of Georgia (whose daughter Rusudan was married to Buqa's son) were implicated. Buqa promised Jushkab the throne on condition of appointment as naib of the empire upon success. However Jushkab sent news to Arghun about the treachery. Arghun in his turn sent his new emir Qoncuqbal to arrest Buqa. It's unknown how Rusudan escaped the purge by Arghun but Demetre II was summoned to capital and imprisoned as well. Buqa was put to death on January 16, 1289. He was succeeded as vizier by a Jewish physician Sa’d al-Daula of Abhar.
