= Tommaso Ugi di Siena =

Italian diplomat in the service of the Mongols

Tommaso Ugi di Siena was a 14th-century Italian adventurer, native of the city of Siena in Italy. He resided at the court of the Mongol Ilkhanid ruler Oljeitu in the Persian capital of Tabriz, where he held the high position of Ildüchi, "Sword bearer", for Oljeitu. Other adventurers, such as Buscarello de Ghizolfi or Isol the Pisan, are known to have played similar roles at the Mongol court. Hundreds such Western adventurers entered into the service of Mongol rulers.

In 1307, Tommaso led a Mongol embassy sent by Oljeitu to European monarchs. This embassy encouraged Pope Clement V to speak in 1307 of the strong possibility that the Mongols could remit the Holy Land to the Christians, and to declare that the Mongol embassy from Oljeitu "cheered him like spiritual sustenance". Relations were quite warm: in 1307, the Pope named John of Montecorvino the first Archbishop of Khanbalik and Patriarch of the Orient.

The embassy further promised the delivery of between 100,000 and 200,000 horses to the Crusaders upon their arrival in the Holy Land.

European nations accordingly prepared a crusade, but were delayed. A memorandum drafted by the Grand Master of the Knights Hospitallers Guillaume de Villaret about military plans for a Crusade envisaged a Mongol invasion of Syria as a preliminary to a Western intervention (1307/8). A corps of Frank mangonel specialists is known to have accompanied the Ilkhanid army in the conquest of Herat in 1307.

== See also ==
- Franco-Mongol alliance
