= Aq Buqa =

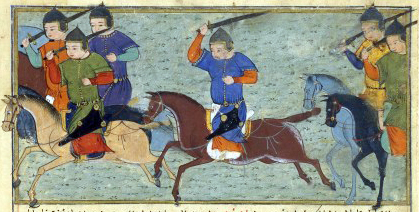
Tekuder leading his Mongol warriors.

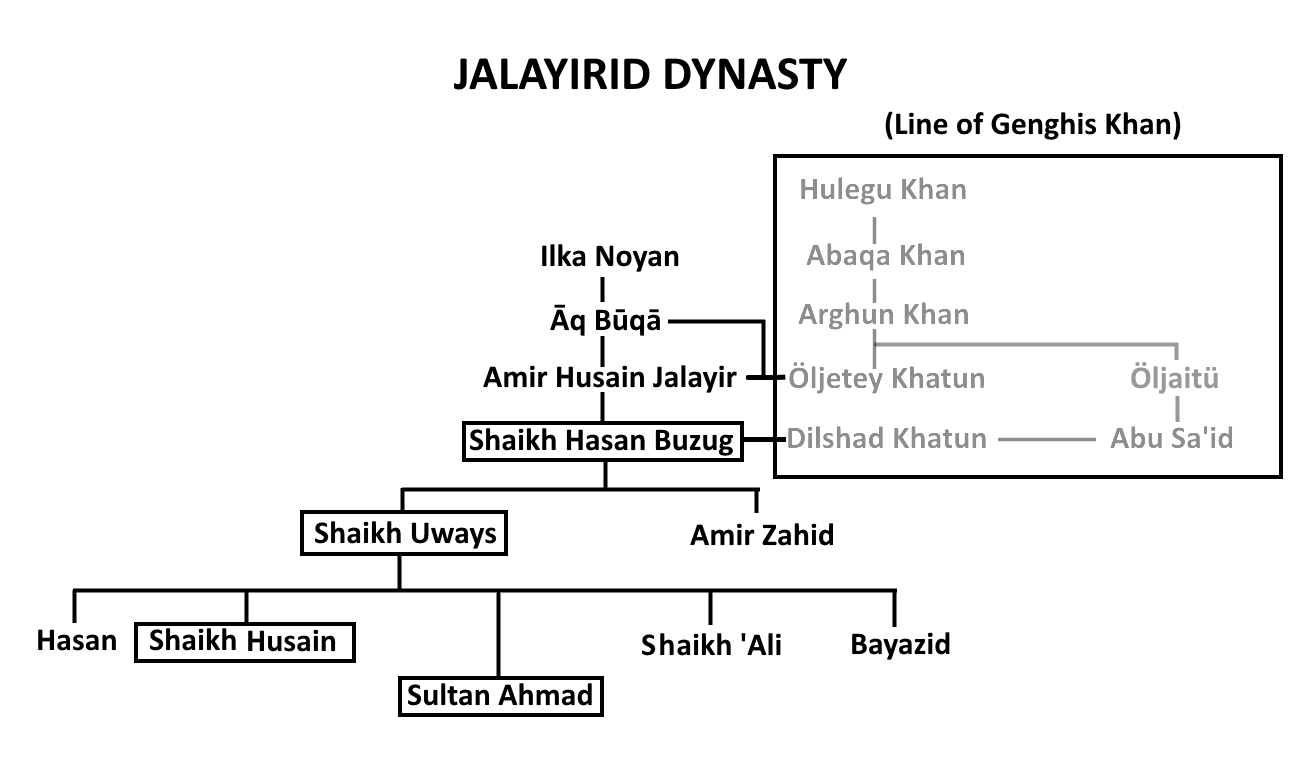
Jalayirid dynasty, and contribution from the line of Genghis Khan.

Aq Buqa, or Āq Būqā (died 1295) was a Jalayirid general of the Mongol ruler Tekuder. He was a son of Ilka Noyan, a follower of Hülegü Khan. He was the father of Amir Husain Jalayir, and grandfather of Hasan Buzurg, founder of the Jalayirid dynasty. He was a cousin of Buqa, a Mongol lord and chancellor who was instrumental in bringing Arghun to power as the fourth Il-Khan of Iran in 1284. Aq Buqa had a brother named Tughu.

Aq Buqa was in the service of Abaga khan. Aq Buqa, who was promoted to mir-e mirān (commander-in-chief) by Gaykhatu, was later assassinated by Baydu's supporters in 1295. He became the patron (murabbī) of Sadr al-Din Zanjani, Kaykhatu's grand vizier. Aq Buqa was married to Ghazan khan's sister Ūljatāy Sulṭān, but after his death, his son Husain married his father's wife and took the title of gūrgān (greregen) or royal son-in-law.

== Sources ==
- Jackson, Peter (2008). "Jalayerids". Encyclopaedia Iranica, Vol. XIV, Fasc. 4. pp. 415–419.
- Wing, Patrick (2016). The Jalayirids: Dynastic State Formation in the Mongol Middle East. Edinburgh University Press. ISBN 978-1474402255.
- Jackson, Peter; Lockhart, Laurence, eds. (1986). The Cambridge History of Iran, Volume 6: The Timurid and Safavid periods. Cambridge, New York: Cambridge University Press. ISBN 0521200946.
