= Taghachar =

Mongol commander

Viceroy of Anatolia
- In office 1295–1296
- Appointed by: Baydu
- Preceded by: Tashtemür Khitai'i
- Succeeded by: Baltu

Viceroy of Diyar Bakr
- In office 1295–1296
- Appointed by: Baydu
- Preceded by: Baybuqa
- Succeeded by: Mulay

Personal details
- Died: 1296

Taghachar, also spelled Tajir, Ta'achar (Georgian: ტოღაჩარ, Persian: طغاچار; died c. 1296) was a commander in the Mongol Empire's army. He was one of the conspirators involved in the overthrow of three Ilkhanate khans, and placed the short-lived Baydu on the throne in 1295.

== Background ==
Taghachar was a member of the Suquai'ud branch of the Baarin tribe. His father was Qutu Buqa, a tümen commander who operated under Hulagu and Abaqa and died in battle against the Golden Horde. He also had an elder brother called Taiju, who died in infancy. His other relatives, including his grandfather Temüge Noyan, who was an emir, and his uncle Jangqun, who was head of the security force responsible for the roads, were all important emirs of the Mongol armies. When Hulegu entered Persia in 1256, Taghachar commanded a battalion of his western wing. He was mainly stationed in the province of Fars.

== Career under Abaqa and Tekuder ==
His rise to prominence mainly began after the Battle on the Ağsu banks against the Golden Horde on 19–20 July 1265. Although Prince Yoshmut's army defeated Nogai, Taghachar's father Qutu Buqa died in this battle. Like Buqa, as an orphan whose father had died in battle, he was given great importance and care by Abaqa, and later became his inaq – a trusted follower – and a member of the keshig. In his new position as overseer of the vizier Majd al-Mulk Yazdi, he imprisoned Ata-Malik Juvayni on behalf of Abaqa in 1281, accusing him of embezzling the treasury – a charge that was brought by Majd al-Mulk. Soon after Abaqa's death in 1281, Taghachar was among the commanders who were present at Tekuder's election, along with the new ilkhan's mother, Qutui Khatun. Nevertheless, he later supported Arghun, who believed the Juvayni brothers were responsible for his father Abaqa's death by poisoning. Tekuder, seeing Arghun as a strong rival, seized Taghachar along with other emirs who supported Arghun and kept him imprisoned in Tabriz. He was released after Tekuder's arrest on 26 July 1284 and became one of the prominent emirs under Arghun.

== Under Arghun ==
Arghun rewarded Taghachar by making him a commander of the Qara'unas and appointing him as atabeg of his youngest son Khitai-Oghul. In 1289 Taghachar took action against Buqa, who had concentrated absolute power in his hands. Arghun's first step was to investigate unpaid Salghurid taxes. As a result, he appointed Taghachar as the new head of the inju treasury of Fars province, and collected over 1.5 million dinars from the province. After Buqa's death, his associates, including the Georgian king Demetre II, were executed. Demetre's 16-year-old son, David, was placed in Taghachar's household. Taghachar's status was strengthened to the point that he became one of the recipients of letters from Nicholas IV as a person of power.

In 1290, he participated in Arghun's campaign against the Golden Horde emir Nogai in the Caucasus. Moving from the capital on 28 March, he arrived on the banks of the Karasu river ( north of Derbent) and was victorious against Nogai's commanders Toqay Noyan and Terktay Bahadur. Following the victory, Taghachar was sent to the Khorasan front in April. Towards the end of Arghun's reign, Taghachar allied himself with other powerful emirs such as Tugel, Toghan and Qoncuqbal in order to remove the powerful vizier Sa'ad al-Dawla in 1291. Arghun was seriously ill and apparently could not speak, which gave Taghachar and his allies the opportunity to remove their rivals at court, starting with Sa'ad al-Dawla. He invited Arghun's senior emirs Orduqiya, Josh, and Qujan to a feast in honor of his ward Khitay's birthday on 4 March, where they were arrested. Sa'ad al-Dawla was found in suburban Tabriz and was executed in Taghachar's house the next day.

== Under Gaykhatu ==
After the death of Arghun, Taghachar and his allies supported Baydu, fearing that the other candidate, Gaykhatu, would replace them with his subordinates from Anatolia, and falsely told Gaykhatu that Baydu had already taken the throne. The suspicious Gaykhatu tortured the envoy to learn the truth and, upon learning it, sent 10.000 men ahead, while he himself moved to Arran and Azerbaijan. In any case, Baydu refused the throne. Gaykhatu took Taghachar's tumen and gave it to Shiktur Noyan of the Jalairs in 1291. However, he could not stay long in the capital and had to leave for Anatolia upon hearing news of a Turcoman rebellion, appointing Shiktur Noyan as regent of the state while confirming Prince Anbarchi (son of Möngke Temür) as viceroy of the East, stationed in Ray. His absence from Iran was followed by a conspiracy led by Taghachar and his follower Sa'ad al-Din Zanjani. They falsely informed the viceroy Anbarchi – via Sad al-Din's brother Qutb al-Din, who was Anbarchi's vizier – of Gaykhatu's defeat by the Turcomans in Anatolia and called on him to take the throne. Although ambitious, Anbarchi regarded this news with suspicion. After contacting Shiktur Noyan, who was residing near Karachal, Anbarchi had them imprisoned by Shiktur. Taghachar was pardoned by Gaykhatu only in 1292; Gaykhatu even appointed Sa'ad al-Din Zanjani to the post of vizier on 18 November 1292 and Taghachar's ward David as king of Georgia.

After his release, Taghachar continued to serve Gaykhatu. He was mentioned by Rashid al-Din as Gaykhatu's second-in-command in June 1292 in Syria and as an enforcer of Jiaochao in Tabriz. Seeing growing resentment against Gaykhatu, Taghachar secretly changed his allegiance to Baydu again. When Gaykhatu sent Taghachar against Baydu on 17 March 1295, he openly changed sides and led Baydu's armies against Gaykhatu, finally placing the former on the throne on 24 March 1295.

== Under Baydu ==
As Baydu's kingmaker, Taghachar obtained the viceroyalty of Anatolia and Diyar Bakr in 1295. However, seeing the advances of Nawruz against Baydu and his protege Sa'ad al-Din Zanjani's loss of the vizierate, he again changed sides and joined Ghazan. A civil war ensued, led by Ghazan Khan, who executed Baydu on 5 October 1295.

== Under Ghazan ==
Ghazan confirmed Taghachar as viceroy in Rûm on 9 December because he had concerns over his continued loyalty and thought it safer to keep him at a distance. Meanwhile, Nawruz became naib of the Ilkhanate and headed Ghazan's army against the Chagatai khan Duwa's invasion of Khorasan in 1295. However, the Ilkhanid prince Sogai (son of Yoshmut) refused to join the campaign in Khorasan, believing it was a plot by Nawruz to further deprive the nobility of their possessions. Taghachar was thought to have been implicated in the rebellion of Prince Sogai and was declared a rebel. Taghachar strengthened himself in Tokat and resisted Ghazan's commanders Harmanji, Baltu and Arap (son of Samagar). He was soon arrested by Baltu near Delice and was delivered to Ghazan in 1296.

Shortly afterwards, Ghazan reluctantly ordered the murder of Taghachar. He recognised that Taghachar had been of help and was not an imminent threat, and explained his decision by reference to a Chinese story about the execution of a commander who saved a future emperor by betraying a former one.

== Family ==
It is not known whom Taghachar married, but he had at least two sons: Mubarak and Jaruq. Mubarak died in his youth, but Jaruq was apparently alive during the reigns of Ghazan and Öljaitü. According to Kazakh researcher Jaqsylyq Sabitov, Jaruq may have fled to the Golden Horde, where he married a daughter of Mengu Timur and fathered the Golden Horde emirs Khwaja, Saray-Timur and Kutluk-Timur (d.1336).
