= Ilga Noyan =

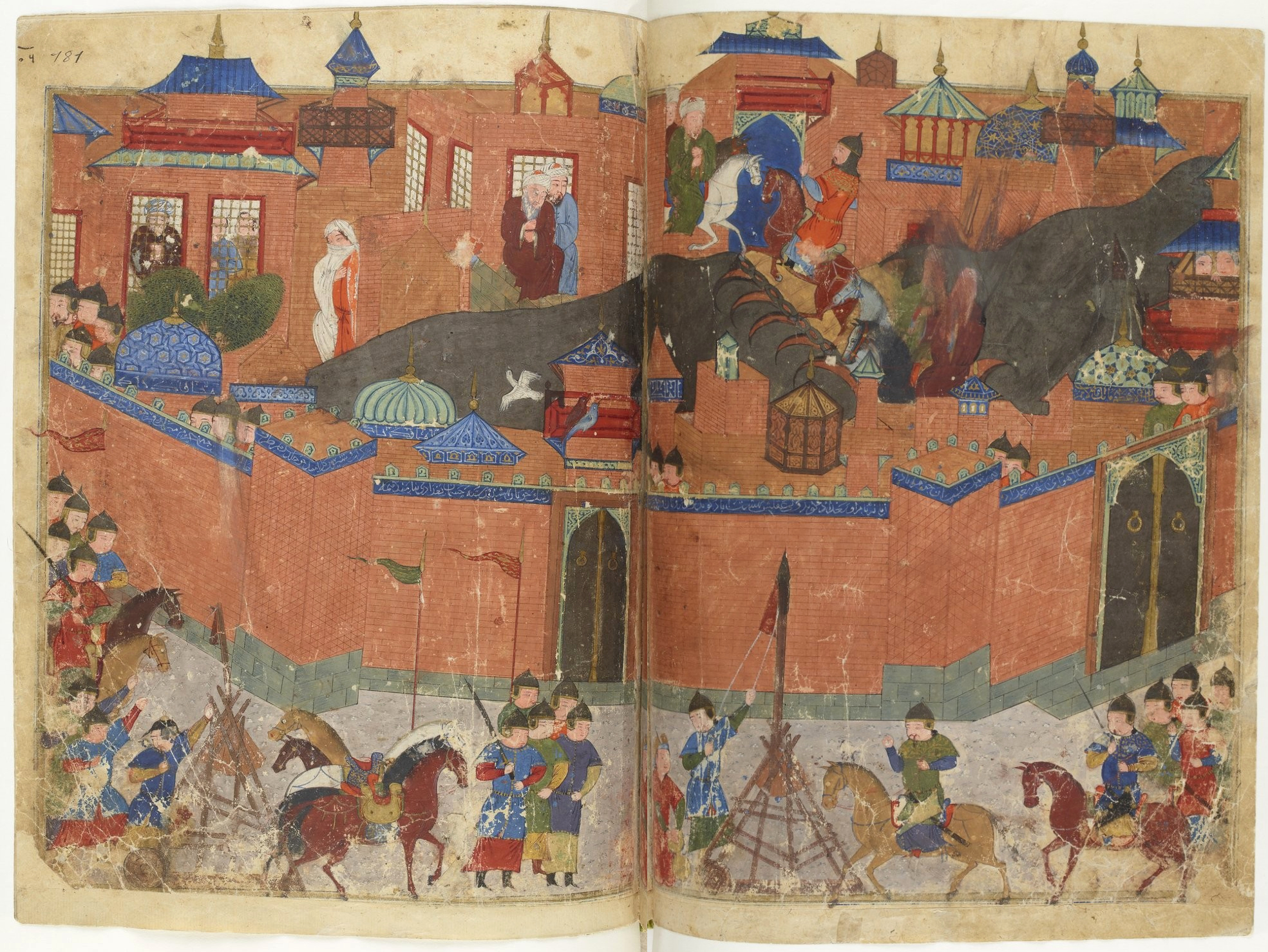
Ilka Noyan participated to Hulegu's Siege of Baghdad in 1258, and was put in charge of rebuilding the city.

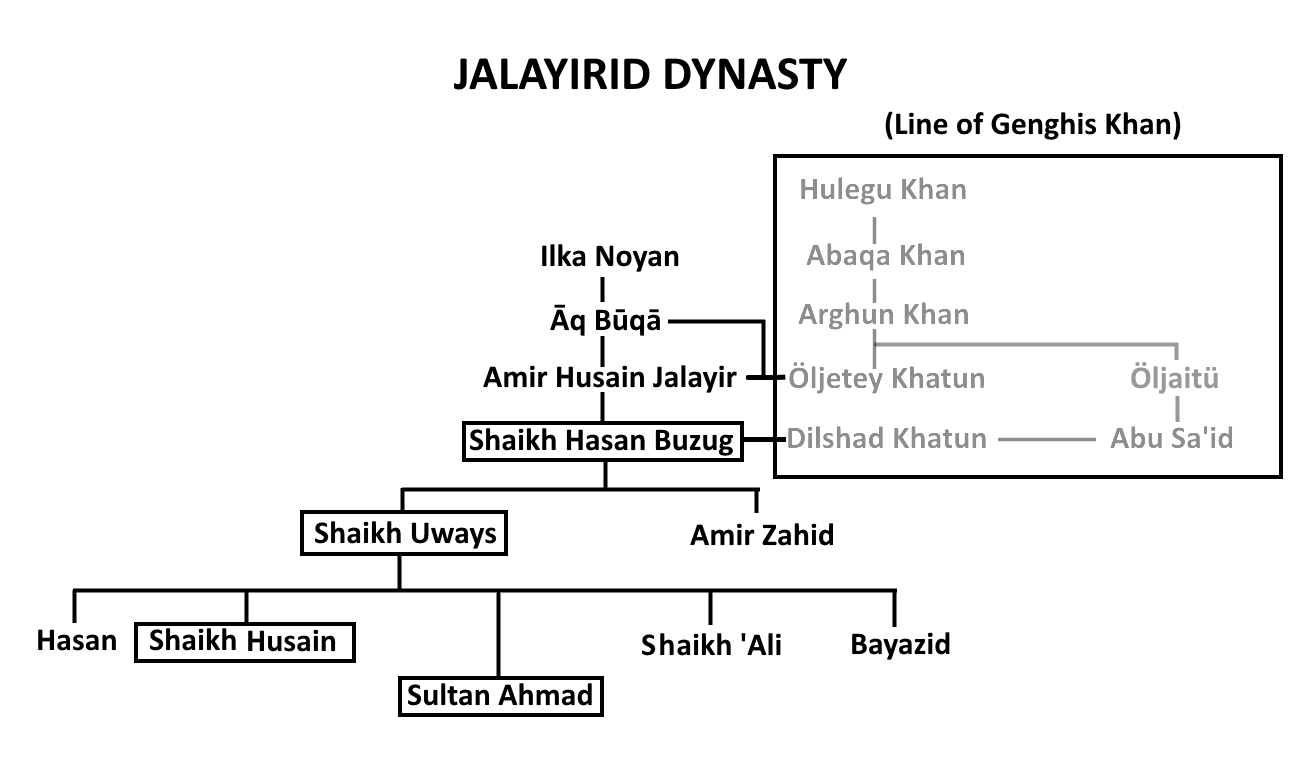
Jalayirid dynasty, and contribution from the line of Genghis Khan.

Ilga Noyan, Ilka Noyan, also Ilge Noyan or Elgäi Noyan (born in Mongolia, died after 1265), was a Jalayirid general of the Mongol ruler Hulegu Khan. He was the father of Aq Buqa, and grandfather of Amir Husain Jalayir, and great-grandafather of Hasan Buzurg, founder of the Jalayirid dynasty. The Mongol Jalayirid dynasty was also called "Ilka dynasty" or "Ilkanids" after him.

Ilka Noyan was also known as Köke (Kukā, ‘Blue’) Ilge. He belonged to the Mongol Jalair (Jalāyer) tribe, whose ancestral location before the conquests of Genghis Khan was along the River Onon in Mongolia. Ilka Noyan accompanied Hülegü on his expedition to Western Asia in the 1250s, participating in the capture of the Assassin fortress in Qohestan in 1256. He participated in the Siege of Baghdad in 1258, and was put in charge of rebuilding the city thereafter. He also participated in the campaign to Mayyāfāreqin, and in the late 1260s the campaign to avenge the defeat in the 1260 Battle of Ain Jalut against the Mamluk Sultanate.

As of 1265, Ilka Noyan was Commander in Chief of the Il-khanid armies of Hulegu.

When Abaqa was enthroned in 1265, in charge of the ordos (“royal encampment”), and was described as a "veteran amir".

Many of his sons were in the service of Abaqa's successors, particularly Shīktūr Noyan and Aq Būqā.

== Sources ==
- Jackson, Peter (2008). "Jalayerids". Encyclopaedia Iranica, Vol. XIV, Fasc. 4. pp. 415–419.
- Wing, Patrick (2016). The Jalayirids: Dynastic State Formation in the Mongol Middle East. Edinburgh University Press. ISBN 978-1474402255.
- Jackson, Peter; Lockhart, Laurence, eds. (1986). The Cambridge History of Iran, Volume 6: The Timurid and Safavid periods. Cambridge, New York: Cambridge University Press. ISBN 0521200946.
- Jackson, Peter (2014). Jalayerids. Encyclopedia Iranica Vol. XIV, Fasc. 4. pp. 415–419.
