= Amir Husain Jalayir =

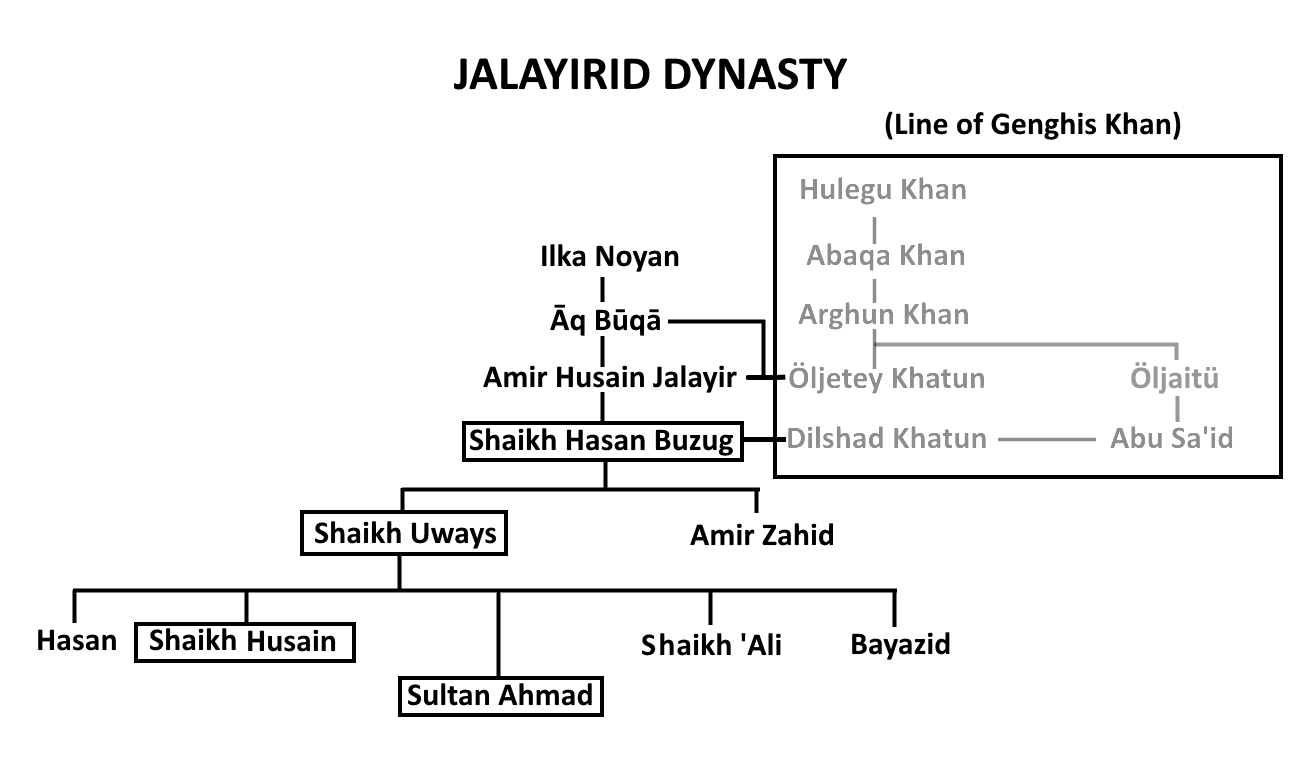
Jalayirid dynasty, and contribution from the line of Genghis Khan.

Amir Husain Jalayir, also Amir Husayn Küregen (died 1322), was a Jalayirid general of the Mongol Il-Khanate. He was a grandson of son of Ilka Noyan, a follower of Hülegü Khan. His father was Aq Buqa, a Mongol general of Tekuder. He was the father of Hasan Buzurg, founder of the Jalayirid dynasty.

After his father Aq Buqa was assassinated by Baydu's supporters in 1295, Husain Jalayir married his father's wife, a Chinggisid princess and sister of Ghazan Khan named Ūljatāy Sulṭān. He took the title of gūrgān (greregen) or "royal son-in-law".

Husain first served Oljaitu and then Abu Sa'id, and took part in the march on Gilan in 1317. He was later appointed ruler of Arran in 1313 and died in Khorasan in 1322.

While Amīr Ḥusayn’s wife, Öljetey Sultan, was the khan’s sister, Amīr Ḥusayn’s own daughter, Suyurghatmish, was married to Öljeytü.

== Sources ==
- Jackson, Peter (2008). "Jalayerids". Encyclopaedia Iranica, Vol. XIV, Fasc. 4. pp. 415–419.
- Wing, Patrick (2016). The Jalayirids: Dynastic State Formation in the Mongol Middle East. Edinburgh University Press. ISBN 978-1474402255.
- Jackson, Peter; Lockhart, Laurence, eds. (1986). The Cambridge History of Iran, Volume 6: The Timurid and Safavid periods. Cambridge, New York: Cambridge University Press. ISBN 0521200946.
