= Geoffrey of Langley =

English ambassador (1243–1307)

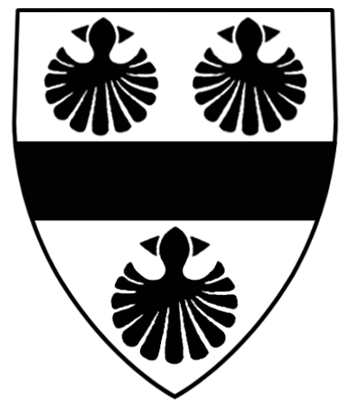
Coat of arm of Geoffrey of Langley

Geoffrey of Langley was an English knight and ambassador of the 13th century. He participated in the crusade of Edward I of England in the Holy Land in the years 1270–71.

Geoffrey de Langley was also sent to the Mongol Il-Khanate court of Ghazan in 1291. Geoffrey left from Genoa, where he was joined by the Khan's ambassador to the West Buscarel of Gisolfe to go to the Mongol capital of Tabriz. The embassy is known in some detail because the financial accounts of it have remained. Geoffrey returned to Genoa on 11 January 1293.

Geoffrey of Langley was a member of the English knights under Edmond of Lancaster who went to France in 1294.
