= Laurent Dailliez =

"Les Templiers", Laurent Dailliez.

Laurent Dailliez (died 1991) was a French history doctor who graduated from Ecole pratique des hautes études. He was a researcher in medieval studies at the CNRS, a historian of the Crusades, and a specialist of the Knights Templar. Among other books, he wrote "Les Templiers". Dailliez was also the author of the article on the Templars in the leading French language encyclopedia, Encyclopedia Universalis.

== Reviews ==
Dailliez is mentioned in the bibliography of the French specialist of the Knight Templars Alain Demurger, and referenced repeatedly from his book Jacques de Molay, dernier grand maitre du Temple (1974). Dailliez's collection of the Templar's Rule was used in the bibliography of The Real History Behind the Templars by Sharan Newman. Newman noted that many versions of the Rule were available, but chose the Dailliez version since it was in both Old French and Modern French. Some work by Dailliez is also referenced in Reconquest and Crusade in Medieval Spain by Joseph F. O'Callaghan. Daillez is referenced by Malcolm Barber in the bibliography and notes of his book The New Knighthood- A History of the Order of the Temple for his book on the rule of the Templars; in Ivanhoe (Penguin Classics) by Walter Scott and Graham Tulloch; in Les Chevaliers teutoniques by Henry Bogdan for his book on the Teutonic Knights; in "Monasticon Praemonstratense: Id Est, Historia Canoniarum Atque Circariarum : 2 Parts" by Norbert Backmund for his work on the Abbaye Notre-Dame D'Huveaune.

Various works of Dailliez are also referenced in De tempeliers: de tempelorde tijdens de kruistochten en in de Lage landen J. Hosten (Dutch); The Crusades and the Military Orders by József Laszlovszky, Zsolt Hunyadi; The "polytyque Churche": Religion and Early Tudor Political Culture, 1485-1516 by Peter Iver Kaufman; Europa an der Wende vom 11. Zum 12. Jahrhundert by Klaus Herbers and Werner Goez; Knighthoods of Christ: Essays on the History of the Crusades by Norman Housley and Malcolm Barber, Tournament by David Crouch; Il mezzogiorno normanno-svevo e le crociate by Giosuè Musca for his work Les Templiers en Flandre; Historia, clima y paisaje by Antonio López Gómez for his work on The order of Montesa; Crusader Archaeology: The Material Culture of the Latin East by Adrian J. Boas; Saint Blaise: Evêque de Sébaste, Arménie mineure by Armand Tchouhadjian.

== Criticism ==
Demurger complained that Dailliez usually does not provide references for his work, and also accused him of taking "mischievous pleasure in muddying the waters," such as by asserting the claim that Jacques de Molay, Grand Master of the Knights Templar, had been a general in the Mongol army and participated in an attack on Jerusalem. Demurger elsewhere highlighted some mistakes made by Dailliez, saying an assertion was "false but held as true by Dailliez, who is usually more serious."

== Bibliography ==
- La Roque d'Antheron, 1967
- Les templiers: ces inconnus, 1972
- Bibliographie du Temple, C.E.P, Paris, 1972, 216p.
- Les Templiers et les règles de l'Ordre du Temple, P. Belfond, Paris, 1972, 267p.
- Jacques de Molay : dernier maître du Temple, R. Dumas, Paris, 1974, 208p. ISBN 2-85338-003-3
- À la recherche la Bretagne celtique, 1974
- La France des Templiers, Marabout, coll. « Guide Marabout », Paris, 1974, 185p.
- Combat contre le cancer, 1974
- Sur les chemins de la Bretagne des calvaires, 1975
- Découvrir la Provence romane, 1976
- Les Templiers ces inconnus, Libr. académique Perrin, coll. « Présences de l'histoire », Paris, 1977, 405p. ISBN 2-262-00024-7
- La Règle des Templiers, 1977
- Les Chevaliers de Montjoie, 1977
- Les Templiers en Provence, 1977
- Ordre de Saint-Jean de Jérusalem au Portugal, XI-XVe siècles, 1977
- L'ordre de Montesa, successeur des Templiers, Alpes Méditerranée édition, Nice, 1977, 160p.
- Les Saintes Maries de la Mer: mythes ou légendes, 1978
- Abbaye de Silvacane, 1978
- Abbayes de Provence, 1978
- Les templiers : Flandre, Hainaut, Brabant, Liège et Luxembourg, 1978
- Les Cloîtres de Provence, 1978
- La Règle des Templiers, Alpes Méditerranée édition, Nice, 1978, 400p.
- Aix-en-Provence : le Cloître de la cathedrale, 1978
- Templiers de Provence, Presses universitaires de Nice et de Corse, coll. « Collection Connaissance de la Provence et de la Corse » n°5, Nice, 1979, 130p. ISBN 2-86331-008-3
- Les chevaliers teutoniques, 1979, Librairie Académique Perrin
- Vence: une cité, un évêché, un canton, 1979
- Le Thoronet, 1979
- Saint-Pons de Gemenos, 1979
- Histoire de l'ordre du Temple, 1980
- Les Templiers : gouvernement et institutions, Alpes Méditerranée édition, coll. « Histoire de l'ordre du Temple », Nice, 1980.
- Les Templiers et l'agriculture, ou les composts templiers, 1981
- Abbazie Cistercensi e ordine di Citeaux in Italia = Abbayes Cisterciennes en Italie et ordre de Cîteaux, 1983
- Guide de la France templière, 1992
- Règles et statuts de l'ordre du Temple, Dervy, Paris, 1996 (2e éd. augm.), 399p. ISBN 2-85076-733-6
- Les Templiers, Perrin, coll. « Tempus », Paris, 2003, 404p. ISBN 2-262-02006-X

=== As co-author ===
- With A. Joubert-Chapdeleine: À la recherche de la Bretagne celtique, 1974
- With Jacques Basnage, sieur de Beauval, Jean Pol Lombard: Règle et statuts de l'Ordre du Temple, 1996
- With Jean-Marie Rouart & Bruno Cortequisse: Mémoire de l'histoire, 1999
