= Sa'd al-Dawla al-Safi ibn Hibatullah =

Jewish physician and statesman

Saʿd al-Dawla ibn Ṣafī ibn Hibatullāh ibn Muhassib al-Dawla al-Abharī (Arabic: سعد الدولة بن هبة الله بن محاسب ابهري) (c. 1240 – March 5, 1291) was a Jewish physician and statesman in thirteenth-century Persia (Iran).

Sa'ad was sahib-i divan (vizier and minister of finance) from 1289 to 1291 under the Mongolian Ilkhan in Persia, Arghun Khan. According to Abu al-Faraj, Sa'ad was the father-in-law of the prefect of Baghdad.

== Biography ==
Sa'ad was originally from the town of Abhar in western Iran. He held a position in the treasury department, where he so distinguished himself that the Mongolian governor was jealous and recommended him to court as a physician. Here Sa'ad made a friend of Ordu Kia, a powerful general, and through his influence was sent to collect some 5 million gold dinars in arrears of taxes in Baghdad. He was so successful in raising money that Arghun appointed him assistant (musharrif) in the department of finances at Baghdad, Ordu Kia was appointed military governor, or emir, of that province.

The historian Wassaf says that Sa'ad cured Arghun of an illness, and, having thus gained his confidence, informed the Ilkhan of the corruption among the officials at Baghdad. At the same time he impressed Arghun with his ability, his knowledge of the Mongolian and Turkish languages, and by his intimate acquaintance with the conditions existing in the province. He was soon made general controller of the finances of Baghdad, and then of the whole empire, becoming grand vizier. "Thus," remarks Abu al-Faraj, "were the Muslims reduced to having a Jew in the place of honor," a situation which they greatly resented. Arghun, as a Lamaist Buddhist, had no such compunctions.

The administration of Sa'ad al-Daulah (Arabic for "Felicity of the Empire," an honorific name which he took as vizier) appears to have been wise and just, although Von Hammer calls it "sanguinary and golden." He instituted regulations which, although strict, were wise and aimed at a sure increase of the revenue. The taxes were on a fixed basis, and no extraordinary requisitions—of food or animals—were allowed. He employed only Jews and Christians in office, and, as was natural, a large share of the positions fell into the hands of his own relatives. Under him the Jews enjoyed a short period of prosperity, and Abu al-Faraj says they flocked to Baghdad from all parts of the world. It is possible that Sa'ad was instrumental in establishing diplomatic relations with Europe. Besides, he patronized the arts and literature; and a collection of poems and eulogies dedicated to him was made and circulated in Baghdad. On account of this work, mentioned by Wassaf, Heinrich Grätz identifies Sa'ad with Mordecai ibn al-Kharbiya, who is described in a poem (still extant) dedicated to him in terms that might well apply to Sa'ad (Grätz, "Gesch." vii, note 10).

Sa'ad had many enemies. The Mongolian officials hated him because they could no longer divert the revenues to their own use; and the Muslims felt it a degradation to have a Jew placed over them. Sa'ad had also made an enemy of Arghun's favorites and was himself proud and haughty in his bearing. False reports were circulated about him; and no opportunity was lost of maligning him to Arghun, although without effect. It was said that Sa'ad was trying to introduce a new religion at the head of which was to be the Ilkhan. Finally Arghun fell ill, and Sa'ad's enemies - among which Taghachar, Qunchuqbal, and other noyans - took advantage of the opportunity to murder the paralysed Khan, execute Saʿd al-Dawla, Ordu Kia, and their clique in March to April 1291. His goods were confiscated and his estate pillaged. Important anti-Jewish riots ensued in Isfahan and Baghdad.

== Resources ==
- Jacobs, Joseph and Mary W. Montgomery. "Sa'd al-Daulah". Jewish Encyclopedia. Funk and Wagnalls, 1901–1906, which gives the following bibliography:
  - Abu al-Faraj, Chronicon Syriacum, pp. 610, 624–625, Leipzig, 1789;
  - Hammer-Purgstall, Gesch. der Ilchane, i.377 et seq., Darmstadt, 1842;
  - Howorth, History of the Mongols, iii.331 et seq., London, 1888;
  - Grätz, Gesch. vii.173, 183–186;
  - Weill, Gesch. der Chalifen, iv.146 et seq.
