= Tomb of Hüdavent Hatun =

Tomb in Turkey

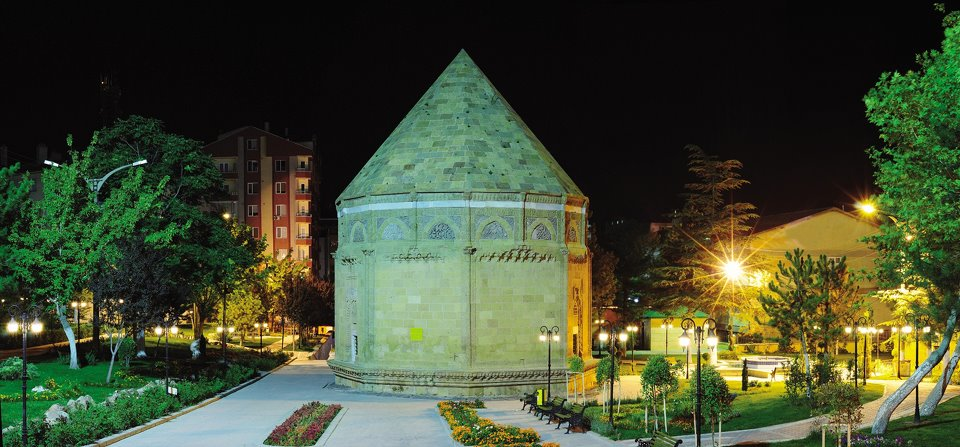
- View of the Türbe

- Location within Turkey

Religion
- Affiliation: Islam
- Province: Niğde Province
- Region: Central Anatolia

Location
- Location: TUR Niğde, Turkey
- Country: Turkey
- Interactive map of Tomb of Hüdavent Hatun
- Coordinates: 37°58′20″N 34°40′33″E

Architecture
- Type: Kümbet
- Style: Islamic, Seljuk
- Completed: 1312; 714 years ago

Specifications
- Height (max): 15,5 m
- Materials: cut stone, marble

The tomb of Hüdavent Hatun (Turkish: Hüdâvent Hatun Türbesi) is a 14th-century Seljuk tomb in Niğde, Turkey.

== Architecture ==
It was built as a türbe (tomb) for Hudavend Hatun, the daughter of Kilij Arslan IV in 1312. It was restored by the General Directorate of Religious Endowments (Vakiflar Genel Mudurlugu) in 1962. The tomb is made of yellow cut stone and is covered by a dome topped with a sixteen-sided pyramidal roof on an octagonal body. Total height is 15,5 metres. White marble was used in the lintels, the arches, the inscription plaques, and the cornice of the dome. The tomb is most known for its elaborate vegetal and zoomorphic carvings.

== Gallery ==
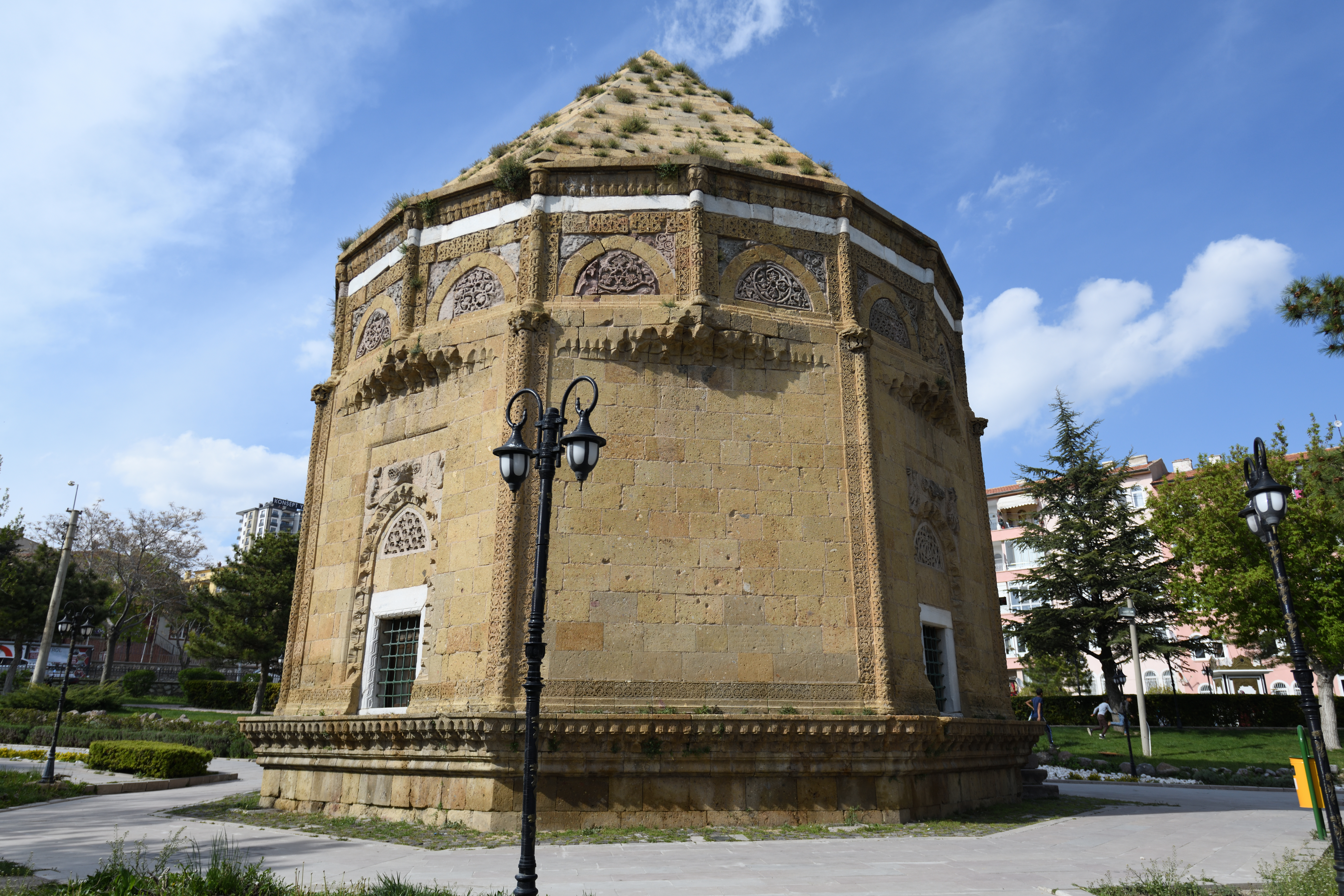
Niğde Hüdavent Hatun Tomb

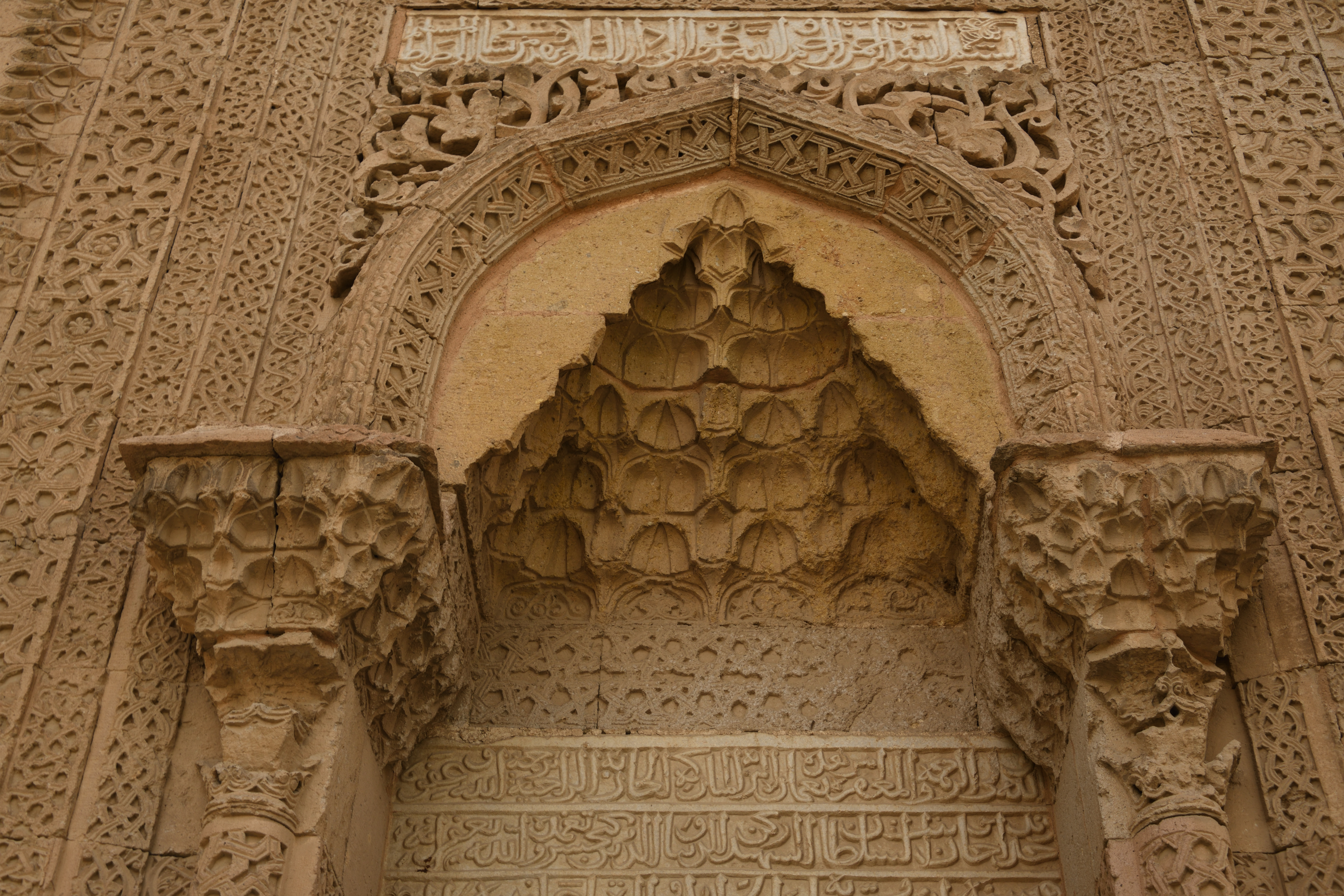
Niğde Hüdavent Hatun Tomb detail above entrance

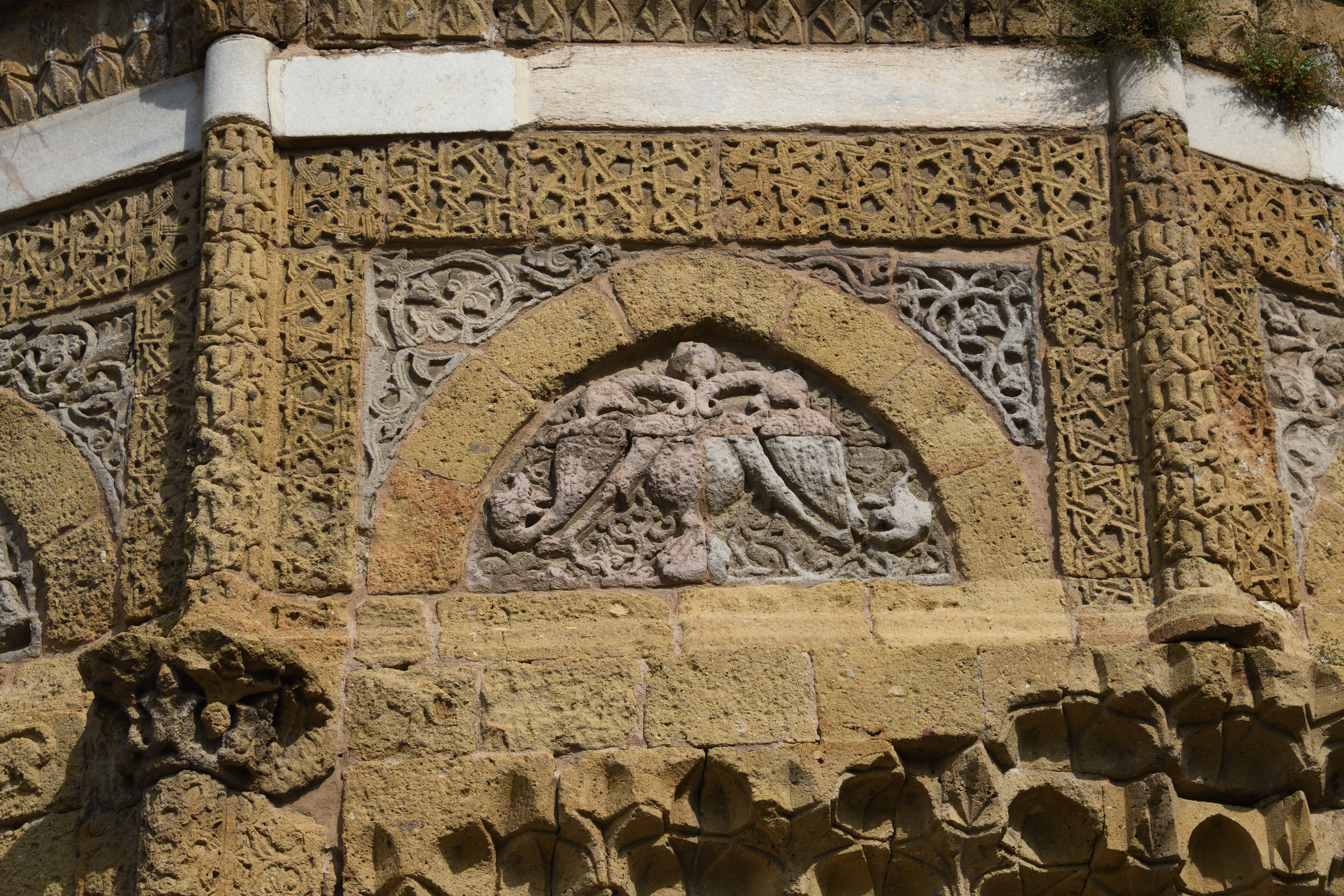
Niğde Hüdavent Hatun Tomb

== Online pictures ==
- Over 40 pictures
- Closer picture from the building
- Picture of the stone carvings
- Picture of the stone carvings of the portal
