= Isol the Pisan =

Italian diplomat in the service of the Mongols

Isol the Pisan, also known as Ciolo Bofeti di Anastasio or Zolus Bofeti de Anestasio (fl. 1300), was an Italian merchant, diplomat, and military leader. For some time he resided at the court of the Mongol Ilkhan, Ghazan, in Persia, rising to become his ambassador or liaison to the Kingdom of Cyprus. His high status at Ghazan's court may stem from his being the godfather of Öljeitü at the latter's baptism.

Little is known about Isol, but the French historian Jean Richard concluded that he was probably the governor of a Persian province. In a letter dated 20 September 1300 from Pope Boniface to the Archbishop of Nicosia, Isol was titled "Vicar of Syria and the Holy Land for Ghazan the Emperor of the Tartars", suggesting that he was put in charge of coordinating relations between the Crusader states and the Mongols. Isol is also a probable source for some of the information about Europe in the "History of the World" chronicle by the Mongol historian Rashid-al-Din Hamadani.

In 1300, Isol acted as an intermediary between Ghazan and European leaders such as Henry II of Cyprus and Pope Boniface VIII. This is mentioned in a letter dated 2 July 1300 written from Barcelona by Romeu de Marimundo, counsellor of James II of Aragon:

From the Tatars, the king of Armenia, the king of Cyprus, the Great Master of the Templars or other nobles from Outremer, are arriving ambassadors on a visit to the Pope. They are already in Apulia and should reach the Pope in the next few days.

Isol was also present as the Mongol representative in July 1300 aboard a small Cypriot fleet of sixteen galleys which were attacking Rosetta and other targets along the Palestinian coast.
