= Kalīla wa-Dimna =

Arabic collection of fables

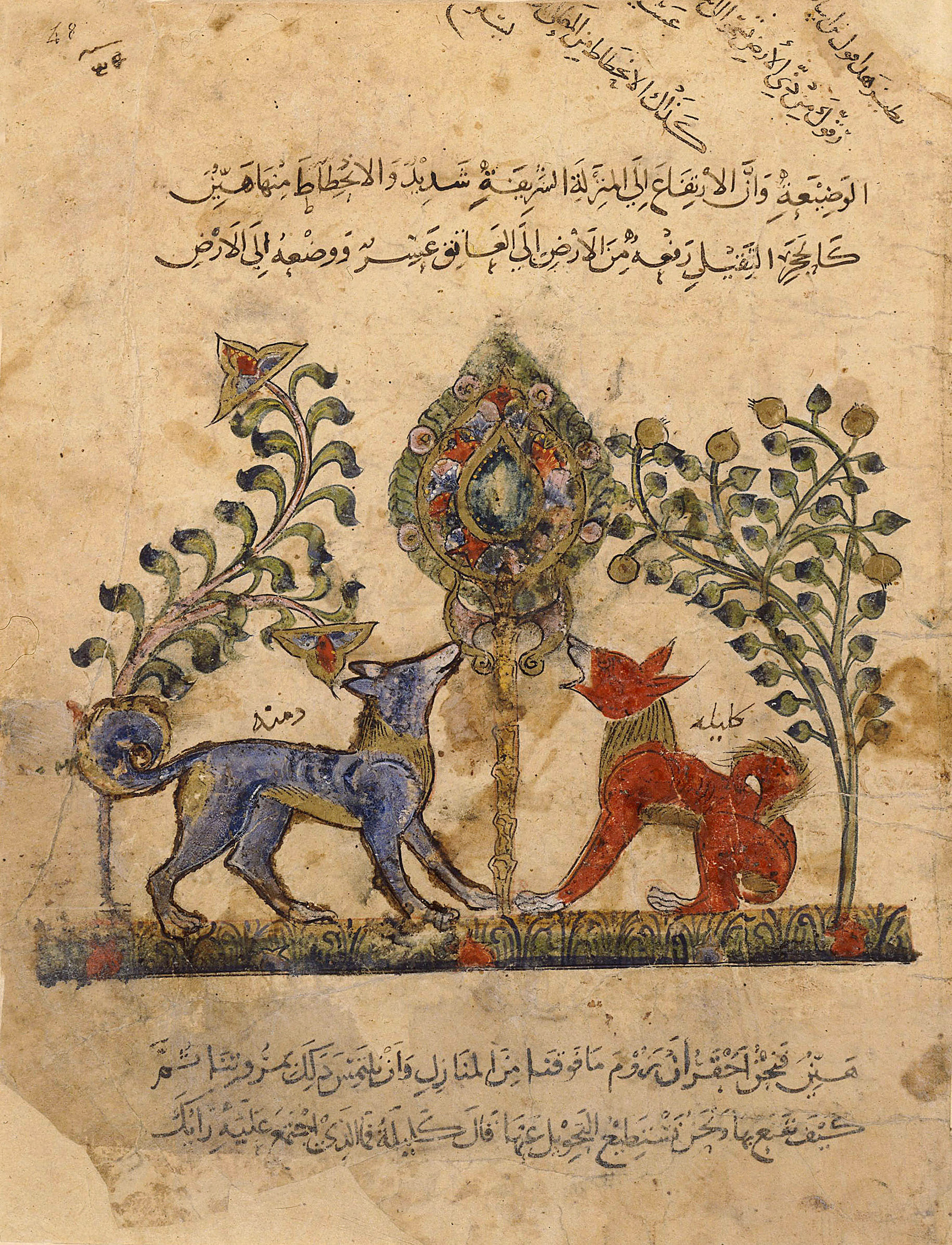
- The two jackals of the title, Kalila and Dimna. Arabic illustration, 1220 (BNF, Arabe 3465)
- Author: Unknown (originally Sanskrit, translated by Ibn al-Muqaffa')
- Original title: كليلة ودمنة
- Translator: Ibn al-Muqaffa'
- Language: Arabic, Early New Persian
- Subject: Fables
- Genre: Beast fable
- Published: 8th century (Arabic translation)
- Publication place: Abbasid Caliphate
- Media type: Manuscript

Kalīla wa-Dimna (Arabic: كليلة ودمنة) or Kelileh o Demneh (Persian: کلیله و دمنه) is a collection of interconnected animal fables that combine moral instruction and political lessons with entertainment. The work derives from the ancient Indian Panchatantra (4th-6th centuries CE), but it became known throughout the Middle East and beyond through a long process of translation, adaptation, and retelling. Traditional accounts describe its creation by the philosopher Bidpai for the Indian king Dabshalim and its later transmission to Sasanian Iran through the physician Borzuya, who is said to have obtained and translated the text.

The fables are presented through a larger narrative frame in which personified animal rulers and advisors discuss questions about good behavior, decision making, and the consequences of good and bad choices. A remarkable animal character is the lion, who plays the role of the king, while the two jackals of the title, Kalila and Dimna, appear both as narrators and as protagonists. Their contrasting personalities and interactions with other animals create one of the central moral tensions of the collection.

The work has been translated into many languages. The most influential version is the eighth-century Arabic translation by Ibn al Muqaffa, who helped shape the structure of the book. Later adaptions include Persian translations by Nasrallah ibn Abd al-Hamid, Ahmad ibn Mahmud al-Tusi, and Husayn Vaiz Kashifi, as well as Georgian translations associated with King David I of Kakheti and Sulkhan-Saba Orbeliani. The work also survives in numerous illustrated manuscripts held in libraries across Paris, Cambridge, Istanbul, Oxford, Riyadh, Rabat, and Munich.

== Origins ==
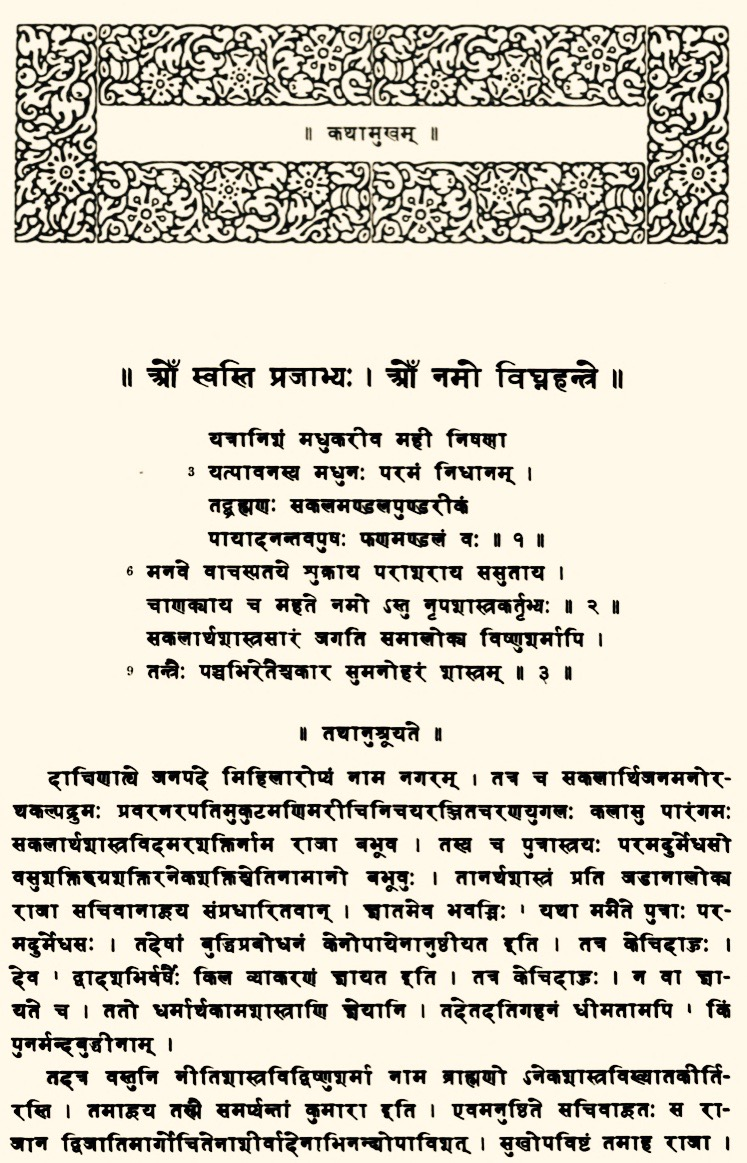
The first page of surviving Panchatantra text in Sanskrit, from which Kalila wa-Dimna can trace the origins of five stories.

The work’s origins can be traced via introductions added by its many translators, many of whom were writing in Persian. According to the preface by Ali ibn al-Shah Farisi, added in 1330, which appears in some Arabic versions, the book was brought during the reign of Sasanian King Khosrow I (r. 531–579). According to tradition, it was created by Bidpai, a Brahman philosopher advising the cruel King of India, Dabshalim, on how to rule as a moderate, merciful king. Bidpai made fourteen chapters, each with a moral guide. News of Bidpai’s book reached the court of Khosrow I, who dispatched the learned physician Borzuya to India to procure a copy for Iran and translate it. As a reward, Borzuya requested a brief biography of his life be written and inserted into the book.

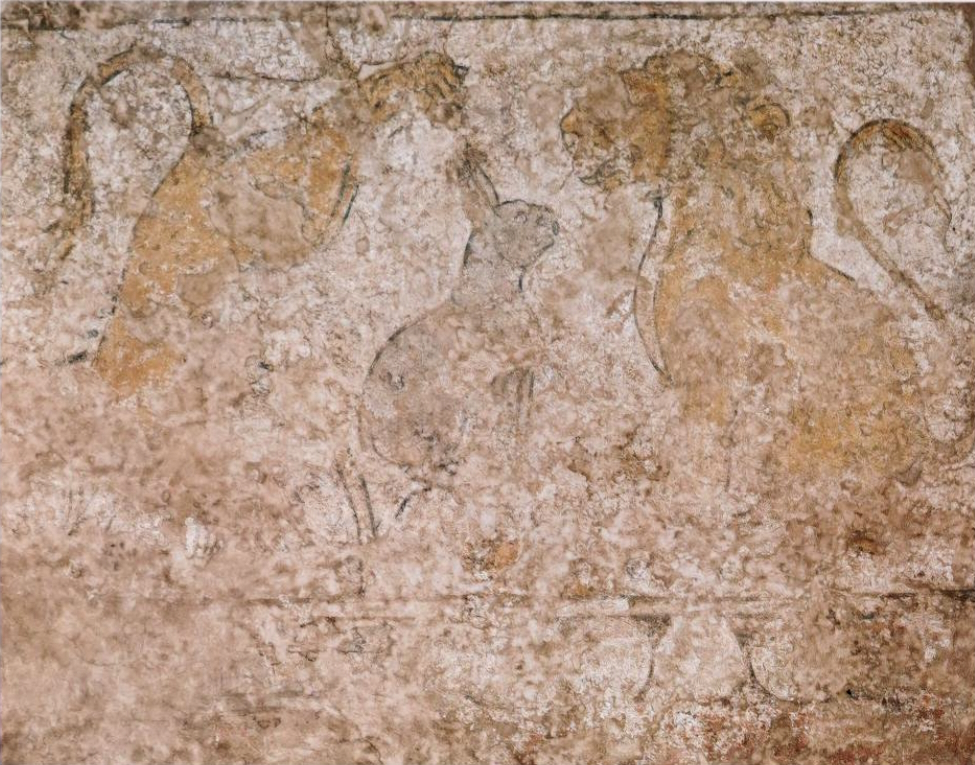
Scene from Kalīla wa-Dimna: The Lion and the Hare at The Well. Painted mural in a private house in Panjikent, Sogdia, ca. 740 CE. St. Petersburg, State Hermitage Museum.

This legendary origin is likely a combination of fact and fiction. The work appears to have been translated into Middle Persian around 570 by Borzuya; the Sanskrit and Middle Persian texts are lost, and the Old Syriac version is unreliable. The Sanskrit version contained five stories from the original Indian Panchatantra; the Middle Persian version added three from the Mahabharata, together with four or five tales from other Indian sources. The popular known version was translated into Arabic by the Persian Ibn al-Muqaffa in 750 CE. Al-Muqaffa also added the chapter on Dimna’s trial and wrote an introduction. Although the tales often appear simple, the direct style makes complex ethical dilemmas easy to understand. Al-Muqaffa emphasized that the fables communicate through animals, allowing audiences of different backgrounds to engage with deeper meanings and lessons.

Thiss immensely popular version inspired works including tales in One Thousand and One Nights.The whole collection was even added to the One Thousand and One Nights in the 17th century's Maillet Manuscript. Kalila wa-Dimna appears in an incomplete but extensive form in the 28th and 29th parts of that Manuscript, covering Nights 841-905. It doesn't appear in other Nights manuscripts.

Al-Muqaffa’s version became the foundation for many subsequent versions. The work was later expanded and retranslated multiple times: Nasrallah ibn Abd al-Hamid produced an influential Persian translation in the mid-12th century, while other notable versions include Ahmad ibn Mahmud al-Tusi’s rendition for a Seljuk sultan, Husayn Kashifi's Persian versification completed in 1504, and King Vakhtang VI of Kartli's translation from Persian to Georgian in the 18th century. Vakhtang VI's work, later edited by his mentor Sulkhan-Saba Orbeliani, has been used as a reference while determining the possible original text, along with an earlier unfinished translation by King David I of Kakheti.

== Synopsis ==
The King Dabschelim is visited by the philosopher Bidpai who tells him a collection of stories of anthropomorphised animals with important morals for a King. The stories are in response to requests of parables from Dabschelim and they follow a Russian doll format, with stories interwoven and nested to some depth. There are fifteen main stories, acting as frame stories with many more stories within them. The two jackals, Kalila and Dimna, feature both as narrators of the stories and as protagonists within them. They work in the court of the king, Bankala the lion. Kalila is happy with his lot, whereas Dimna constantly struggles to gain fame. The stories are allegories set in a human social and political context, and in the manner of fables illustrate human life.

Because of this focus on statecraft, justice, and the relationship between a ruler and his advisors, the book was used for centuries as a foundational text in the "Mirror for Princes" genre, serving as a manual on governance for royalty and the political elite.

== Contents ==
According to the text of the arabic edition of De Sacy and its English translation by Wyndham Knatchbull in 1819, the book has 18 chapters:

- Chap. I. Preface of Ali the son of Alschah Faresi.
- Chap. II. The mission of Barzouyeh to India in search of the Book called Kalila and Dimna.
- Chap. III. The subject-matter of the Book of Kalila and Dimna, from the pen of Almokaffa.
- Chap. IV. The History of Barzouyeh the Physician composed by Buzurdjmihr the son of Bakhtgai
- Chap. V. The Lion and the Bull, or the emblem two friends whom a liar contrives to disunite.
- Chap. VI. Investigation of the conduct together with the defence of Dimna.
- Chap. VII. The Ring-dove, or the emblem of sincere friends.
- Chap. VIII. The Owls and the Crows, or the danger of being deceived by an enemy.
- Chap. IX. The Monkey and the Tortoise, or the emblem of a person who having obtained what he wanted loses it again.
- Chap. X. The Monk and the Weasel, or the danger of haste in an affair with which we are but imperfectly acquainted.
- Chap. XI The Rat and the Cat, or the emblem of a person who has a great many enemies.
- Chap XII. The King and the Bird, or the emblem of revengeful persons who are unworthy of trust.
- Chap. XIII. The Lion and the Jackal, or the emblem of a man who wishes to be reconciled with one whom he has ill treated.
- Chap. XIV. The History of Iladh, Beladh, Irakht, and the wise Kibarioun.
- Chap. XV. The Lioness and the Horseman, or the emblem of a man who abstains from injuring another on account of the evil consequences to himself.
- Chap. XVI. The Monk and his Guest, or the emblem of a man who forsakes one condition of life in order to embrace another.
- Chap. XVII. The Traveller and the Goldsmith, the emblem of a man who bestows his favours in an unworthy object.
- Chap. XVIII. The King's Son and his Companions, the emblem of fate and of the inevitable consequences of the divine decrees.

=== Chapter summaries ===
Below is a summary of the major chapters. Both the chapters and the illustrations are sometimes known by other names, as are the characters.

=== Nasr Allah’s Prologue ===
The first painting illustrates Bahram Shah, twelfth-century Ghaznavid ruler who commissioned the Persian text for the cycle featured in Cowen’s book. This chapter explores the similarities between past and present.

=== The Chapter of Burzuya (or Burzoe) the Physician ===
Burzuya is the main character of this chapter, and because of the events and ethical challenges that occur in the text and illustrations, journeys to India to study, returning with a copy of the Panchatantra, the ancient collection of animal tales that Kalila wa Dimna is based on. The ethical challenges are given each an illustration.

Illustrations: The Fool and the Well, The Clever Merchant and the Gullible Thief, The Greedy Dog and His Bone, Man’s Fate

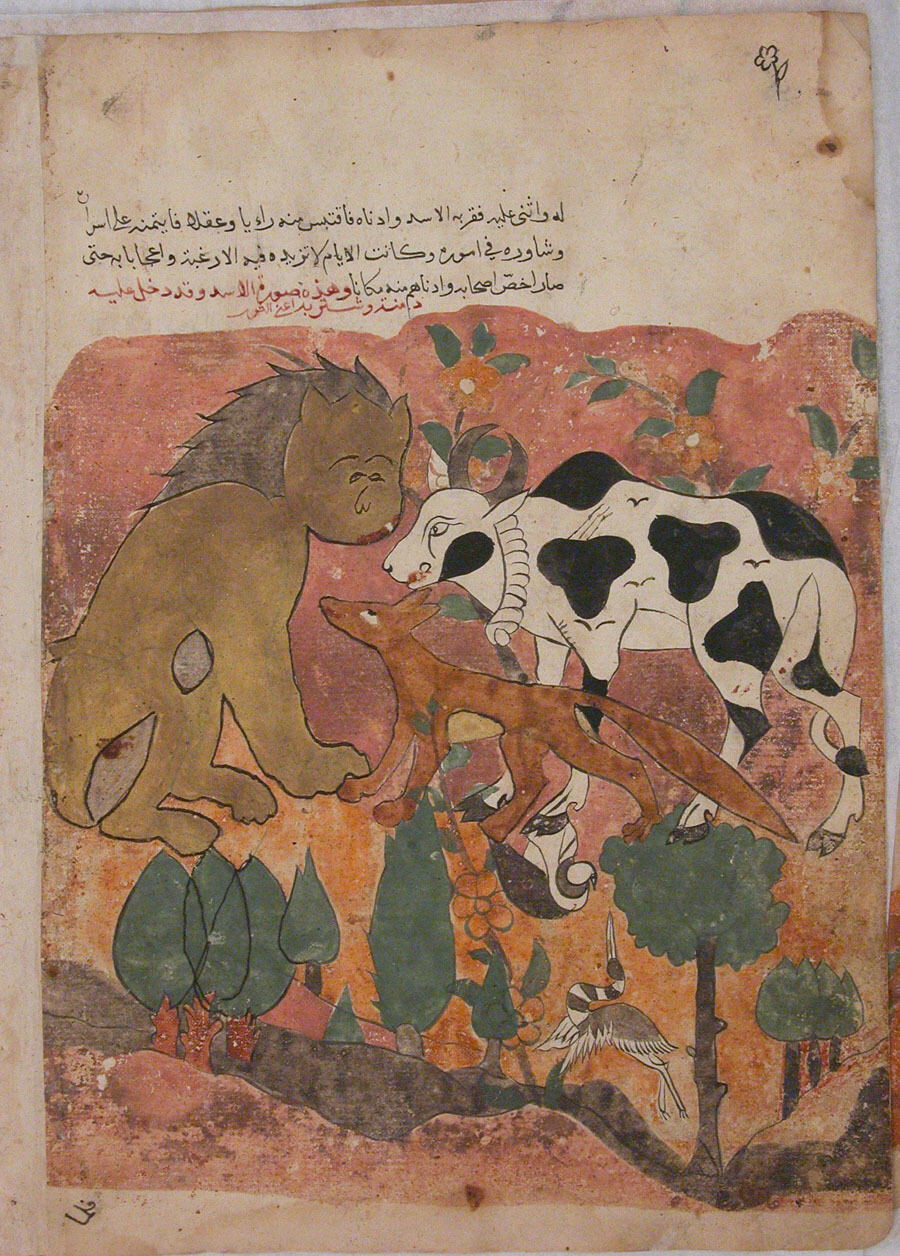
"The Lion King Receives the Ox, Shanzabeh, Escorted by Dimna", Folio from a Kalila wa Dimna

=== The Chapter of Kalila and Dimna ===
Bidpai is asked to tell a story of two friends whose relationship is broken by a scheming individual, who turns them against each other. Readers are introduced to the ox Shanzaba, who while initially scared of the Lion-King, became friends with him. There are two jackals, Dimna and Kalila. Dimna’s introduction led them to become close friends, but Dimna’s scheming caused a rift between them, starting a fight which ended in Shanzaba’s death. It’s the longest chapter in the book.

Illustrations: The Indians, The Father’s Advice, Dimna and Kalila Talking, The Monkey Who Tries Carpentry, The Fox and the Dream, The Lion-King Receives Shanzaba, The Fox and the Battling Rams, The Old Madam and the Young Couple, The Go-Between and the Shoemaker, The Fate of the Go-Between, The Crab Hears the Heron’s Story, The Crab Kills the Heron, Dimna Deceives the Lion-King, The Fish and the Fishermen, The Stars’ Reflection and the Bird’s Illusions, The Battle of the Lion-King and the Shanzaba, The Weasel and the Deceitful Frog, The Rogue and the Simpleton

=== The Chapter of Dimna’s Trial ===
Dimna is judged to be guilty of malice towards the Lion-King, and is killed for his crimes. This chapter discusses that forgiveness and charity are important, but allowing evil will encourage further evil. It only has one illustration, that of Dimna’s Death.

=== The Chapter of the Four Friends ===
In this chapter the Raja asks Bidpai to tell him a story where true friends enjoy the benefits of an honest relationship. It talks of the Ringdove, Crow, Mouse, Tortoise, and Gazelle. The brave mouse, Zirak, saves the Ringdove, and befriends the Crow, Tortoise, and Gazelle with stories. They save each other repeatedly, and help each other in hard times.

Illustrations: The Mouse Frees the Doves, The Crow and the Mouse in Transit, The Dead Hunter and the Wolf, The Ascentic’s Guest Beat the Mouse, The Hunter Pursues the Tortoise, The Hunter Pursues the Gazelle

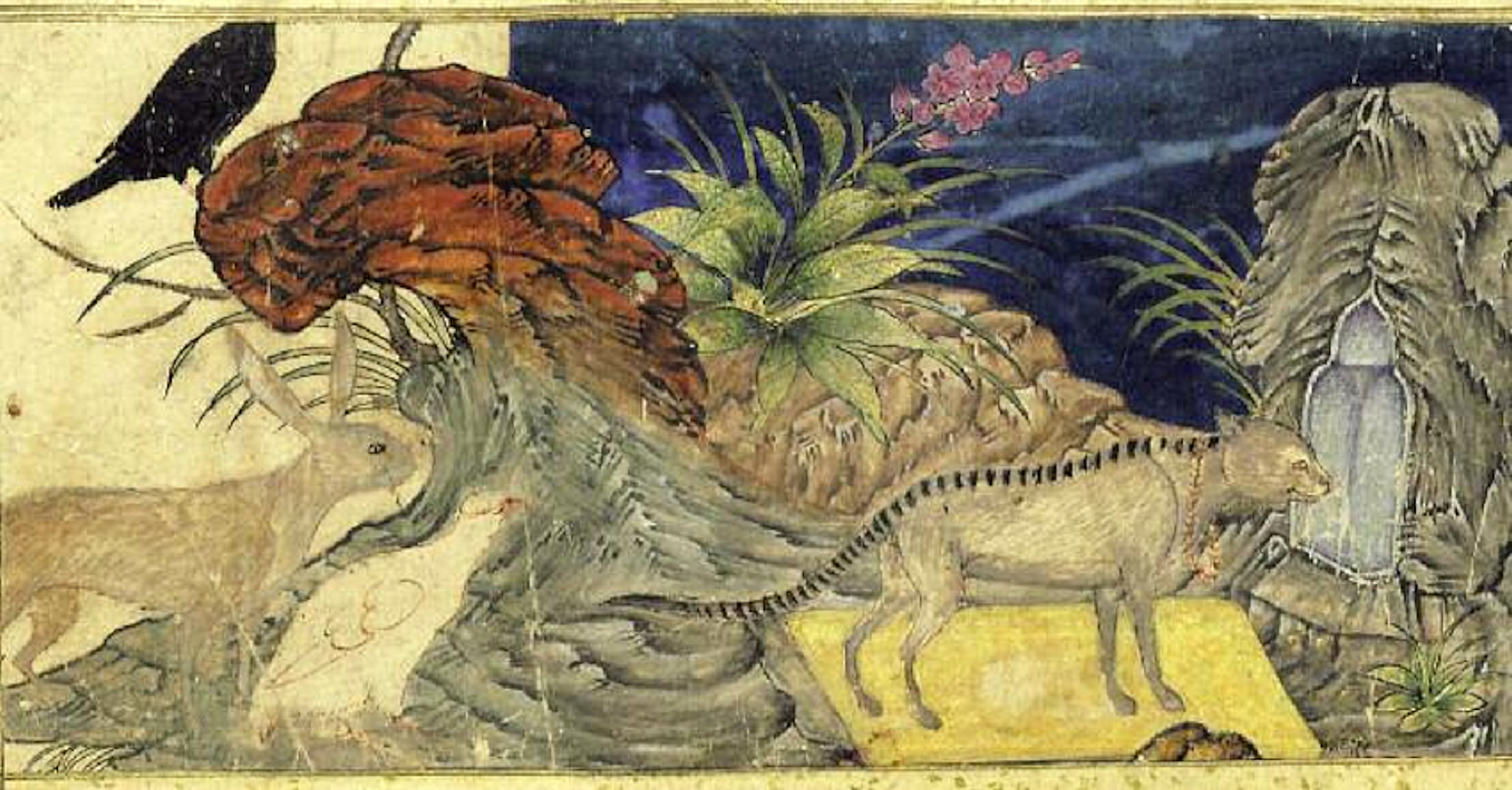
"The Hypocritical Cat", Kalila wa Dimna, Jalayarid, c. 1370-74, Istanbul University Library, MS 1422, fol. 7B

=== The Chapter of the Owls and the Crows ===
The Raja asks Bidpai to tell him a story of an enemy who feigns submission but is actually treacherous, and shouldn't be trusted. The moral is told through the war between the Owl-King and the crows. The crows are attacked and one retaliates by inserting himself in the owl court and betraying them when they gave him the information he needed. The crows are victorious and Bidpai asserts that practiced humility is important.

Illustrations: The Owls Attack the Crows, The Crow Insults the Owls, The Ascetic Cat and His Prey, The Crow Spy, The Ascetic, The Thief and the Demon, The Cuckolded Carpenter, The Ascetic and the Adopted Mouse, The Crows Attack the Owls, The Old Snake, The Snake and the Frogs

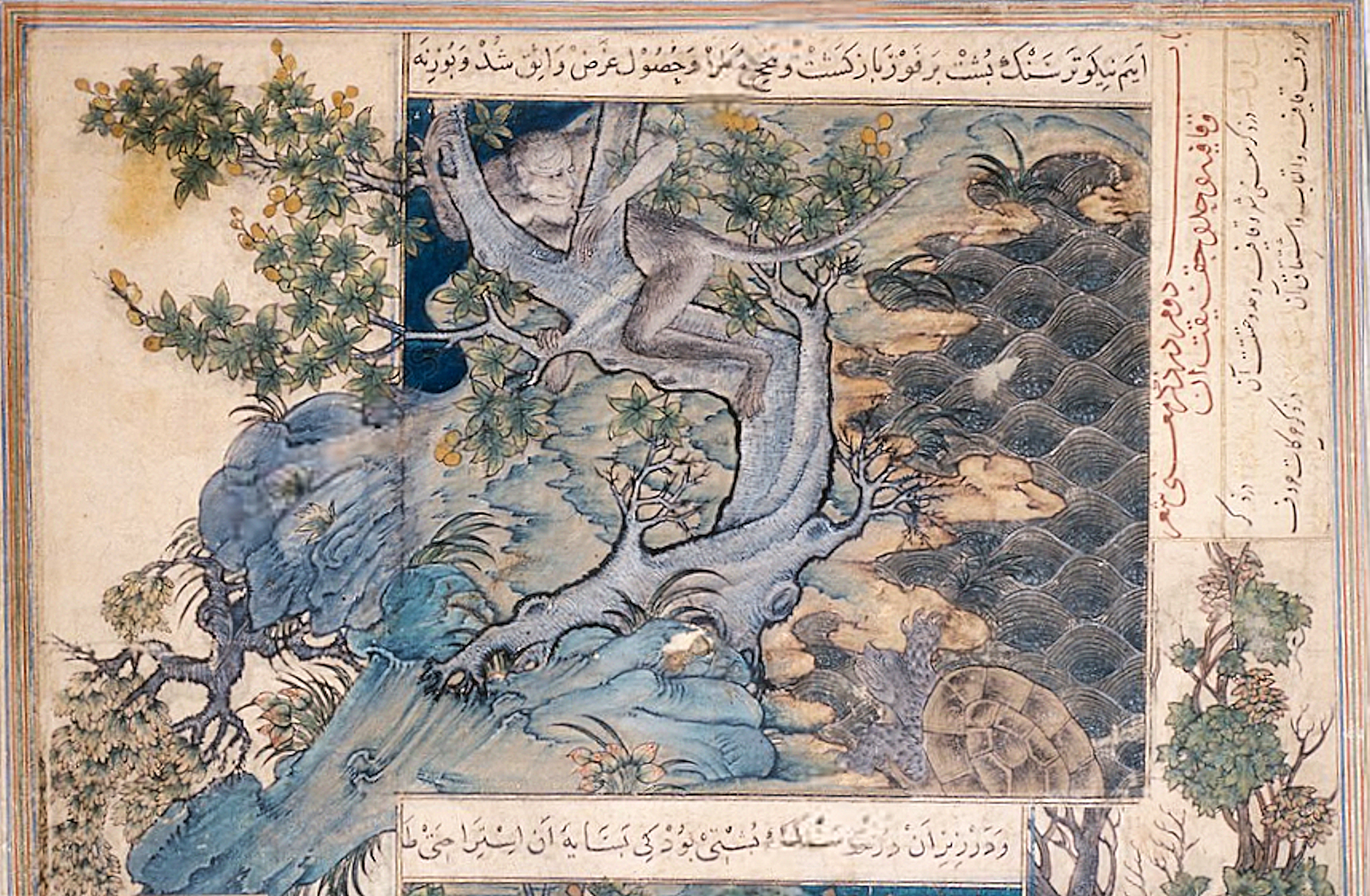
"The Monkey and the Tortoise", Kalila and Dimna. f.1422

=== The Chapter of the Monkey and the Tortoise ===
In this chapter, the Raja asks Bidpai to tell him a story about somebody who earns something great but neglects it until it is lost. Bidpai tells the story of Kardana the exiled monkey-king and his new friend Tortoise. Tortoise betrays him in a twist of circumstance, and Kardana tells the tale of the Ass, Fox, and mangy Lion. Kardana tells this tale to describe why he won’t put his trust in Tortoise anymore.

Illustrations: Kardana’s Deposition, Kardana and the Tortoise become friends, The Tortoise Ferries Kardara, Kardana’s Escape, The Fox Deceives the Ass, The Ass and the Fox En Route to the Lion

=== The Chapter of the Trapped Cat and the Mouse ===
The Raja asks Bidpai to show two enemies cooperating, and to demonstrate how peace is won. Bidpai tells the tale of The Frightened Mouse and the Trapped Cat, and in this first illustration, the mouse is left with no option but to agree to free a cat, who agrees to defend the mouse in exchange for freedom. The second illustration is of their escape, The Escape of the Cat and the Mouse. Bidpai clarifies to be cautious with love and respectful to enemies, because they can easily change.

=== The Chapter of the Lark and the Prince ===
In this chapter, the Raja asks Bidpai about adversaries, and how to treat them. The moral is told by the story of The Lark and the Blinded Prince, the only illustration for this chapter. In this story, a lark’s chicks play with a prince, and are killed. The lark takes revenge on the prince, and blinds him. The King offers friendship, but as a guise for revenge. The lark escapes, telling readers to be wary of a quick reconciliation with a ruthless adversary.

=== The Chapter of the Lion-King and the Ascetic Jackal ===
The Raja asks Bidpai to tell him of advisors who conspire against each other, and make peace when caught. He asks if the king should still trust them. Bidpai tells the story of The Ascetic Jackal and His Brother, the only illustration of this chapter. The Lion-King, after punishing traitors and promising to not let storytellers corrupt his mind, restores the jackal to his position of power.

=== The Chapter of the Lioness and her Dead Cubs ===
The Raja asks Bidpai to tell him of a man who avoids harming people or animals for his soul, and is told the story of the Lioness, whose cubs are killed, and gives up eating meat as a consequence. In the illustration The Lioness Laments Her Dead Cubs the lioness gives up eating even fruits and lives out the rest of her life in prayer.

=== The Chapter of the Ascetic and His Guest ===
This chapter's purpose is to show how a person who abandons their inherited tradition or profession will cost them stability and sense. In the only illustration of the chapter, The Crow Imitates the Partridge, the Crow attempts to copy the Partridge’s calls and fails, then forgets how to do his own.

== Manuscripts ==
Manuscripts of the text have for many centuries and translated into other languages contained illustrations to accompany the fables.

=== P3465: BnF Archives et Manuscrits, Arabe 3465 (c. 1220) ===
Manuscript BNF Arabe 3465. Manuscript in Arabic, located in Paris, at the Bibliothèque Nationale, this is the oldest known illustrated manuscript of Kalīla wa-Dimna. Estimated creation: Hijri: c. 616/Gregorian c. 1220. Status: partially restored. In total, 98 illustrations are included in the manuscript (8 of them are fully restored). It is the oldest illustrated Kalīla wa Dimna. It is an Arabic translation by Ibn al-MuqaffaʿʿAbd Allâh (d. 756/759). The manuscript is attributed to Egypt or Syria, at the time of the Ayyubid dynasty.

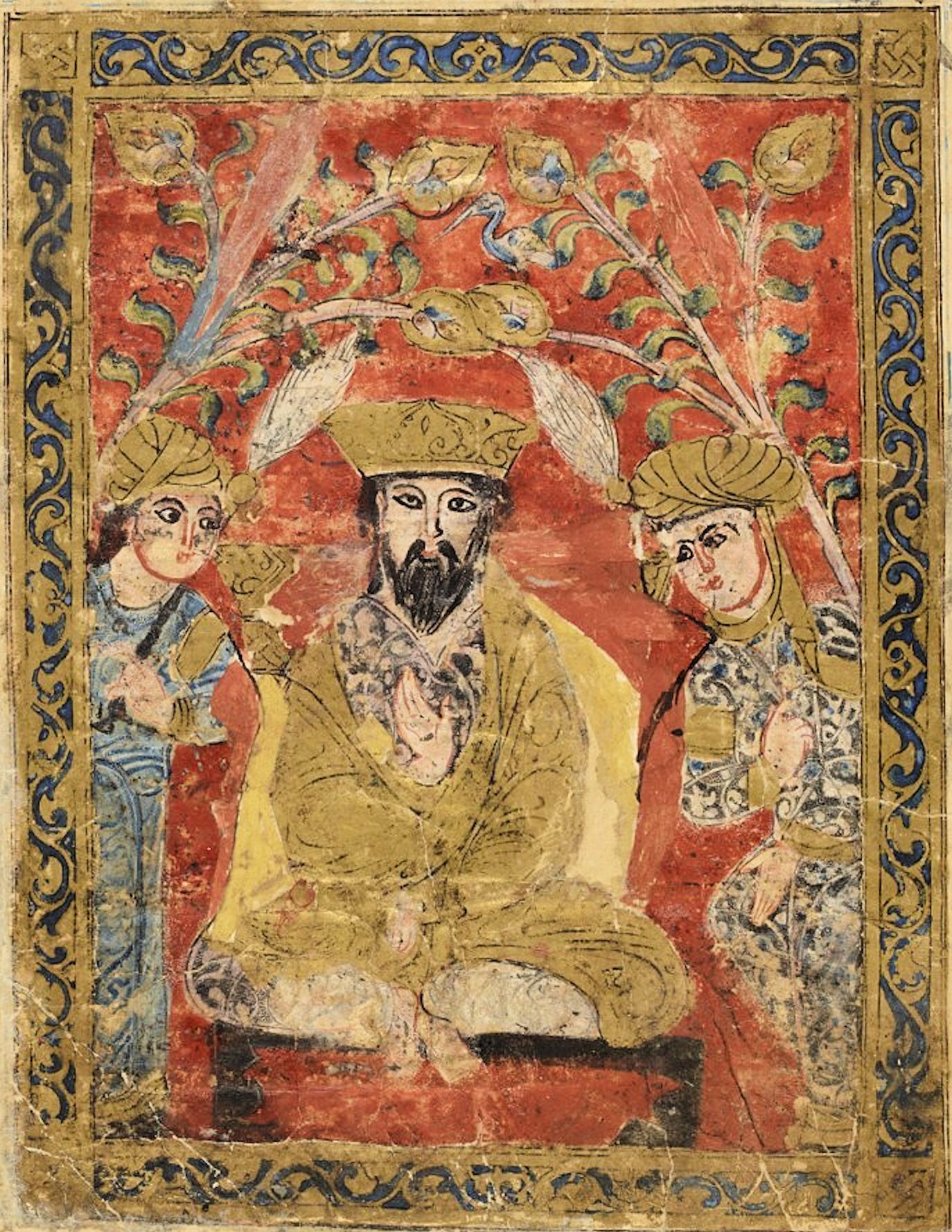
Kalila wa Dimna BNF Arabe 3465, folio 34r. Frontispiece.

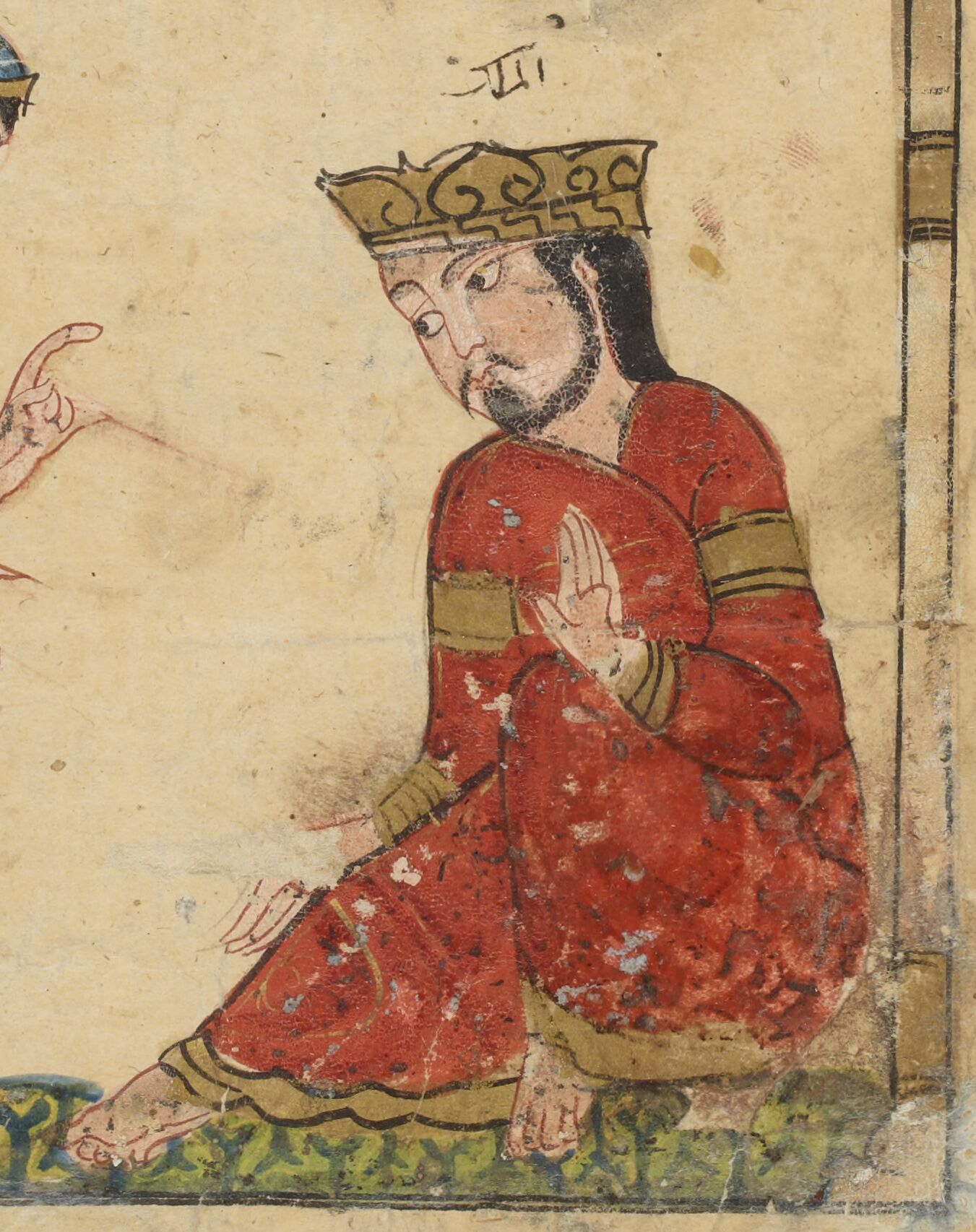
Kalila wa Dimna BNF Arabe 3465, folio 20v. King wearing the aqabā' turkī with uninscribed tiraz armbands.

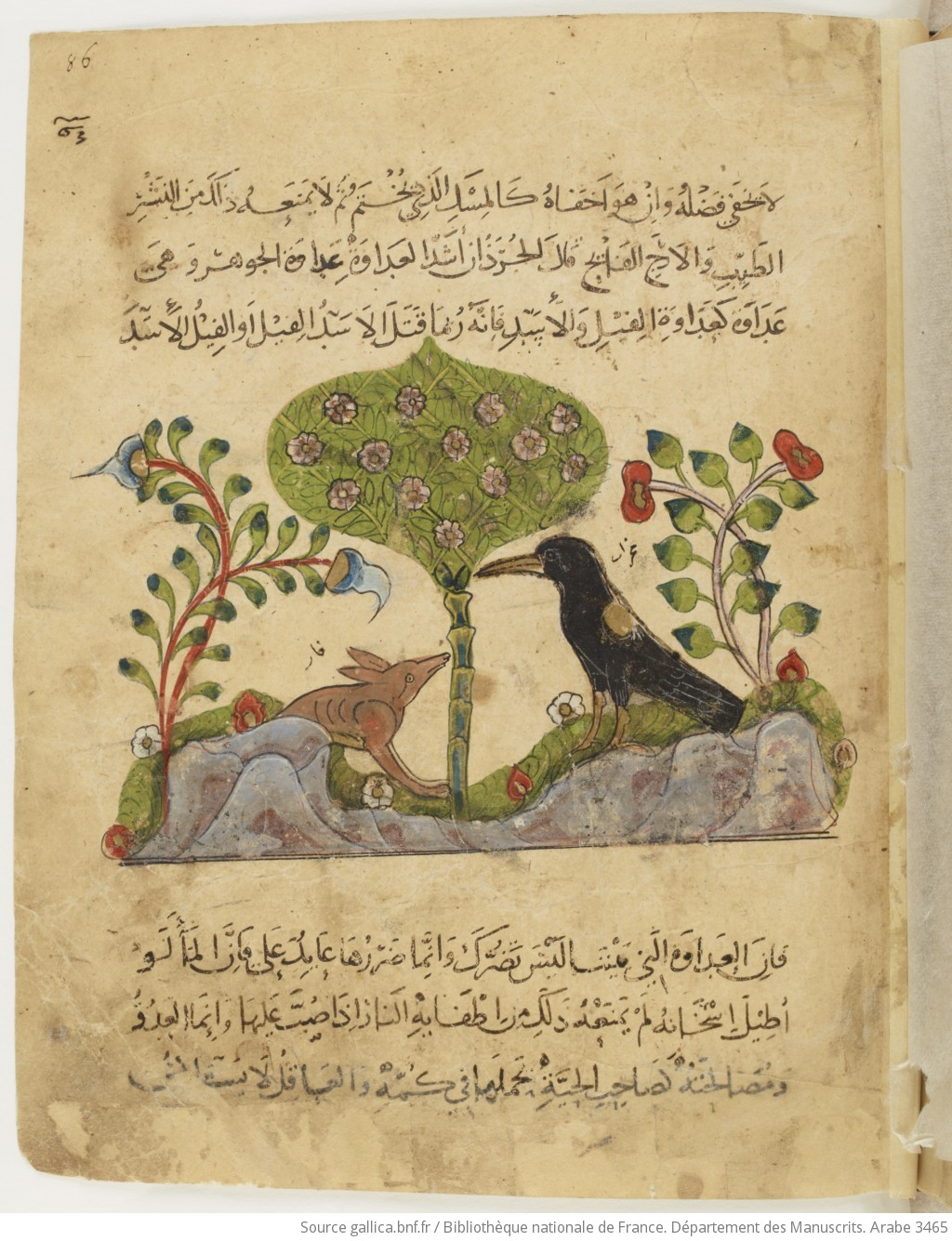
Kalila wa Dimna BNF Arabe 3465, folio 86r. Animal scene

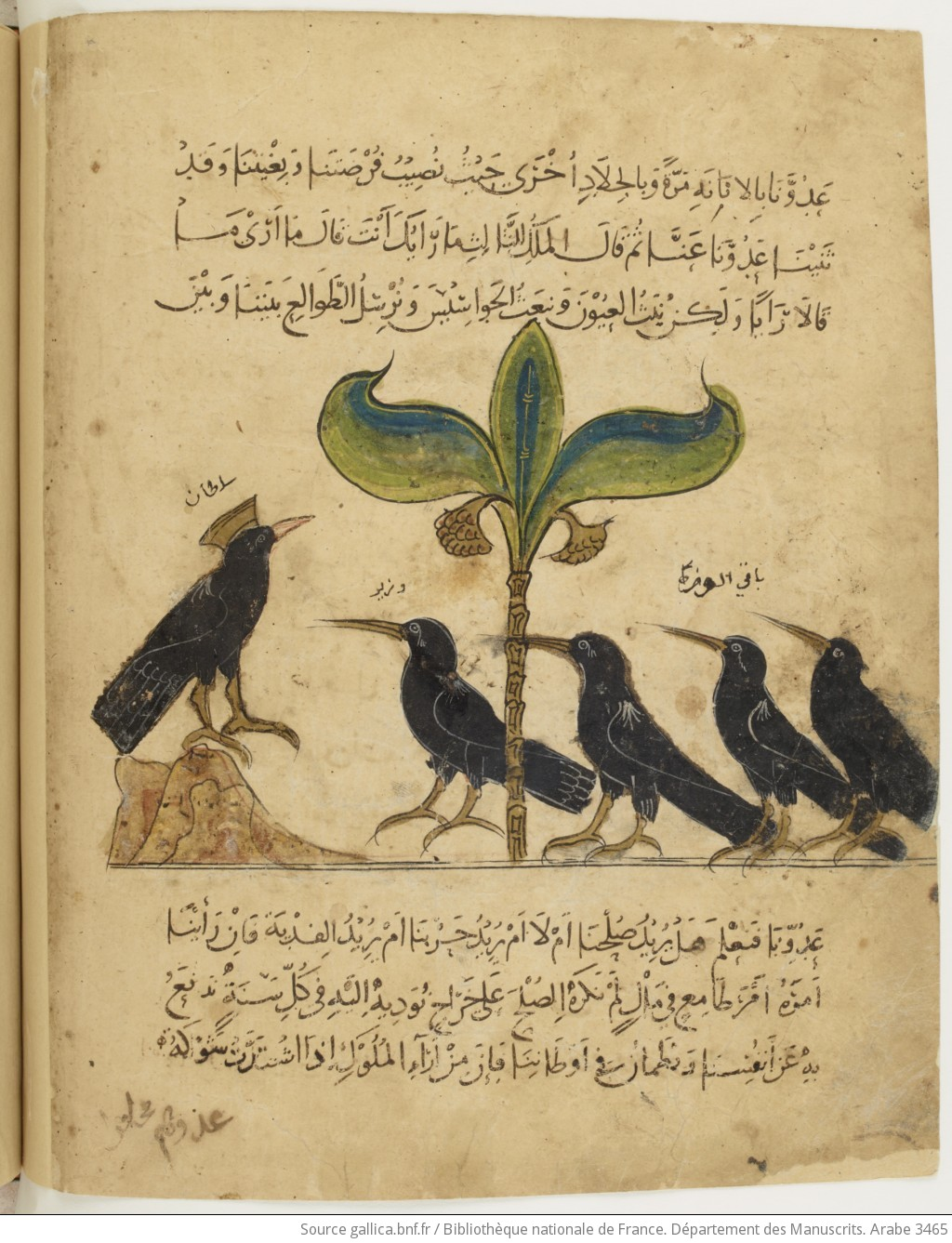
Kalila wa Dimna BNF Arabe 3465, folio 95v. Animal scene

=== BRR3655: Rabat 3655 (1265-1280) ===
Manuscript Kalila and Dimna, 1265-1280, Baghdad (BRR 3655). This manuscript of the Kalīla wa-Dimna of Abu al-Ma'ali Nasrallah is located in the Bibliothèque Royale de Rabat, in Rabat, Morocco. It is written in Arabic, and depicts Arabs and Mongols interacting in their traditional outfits in the wake of the Siege of Baghdad of 1258.

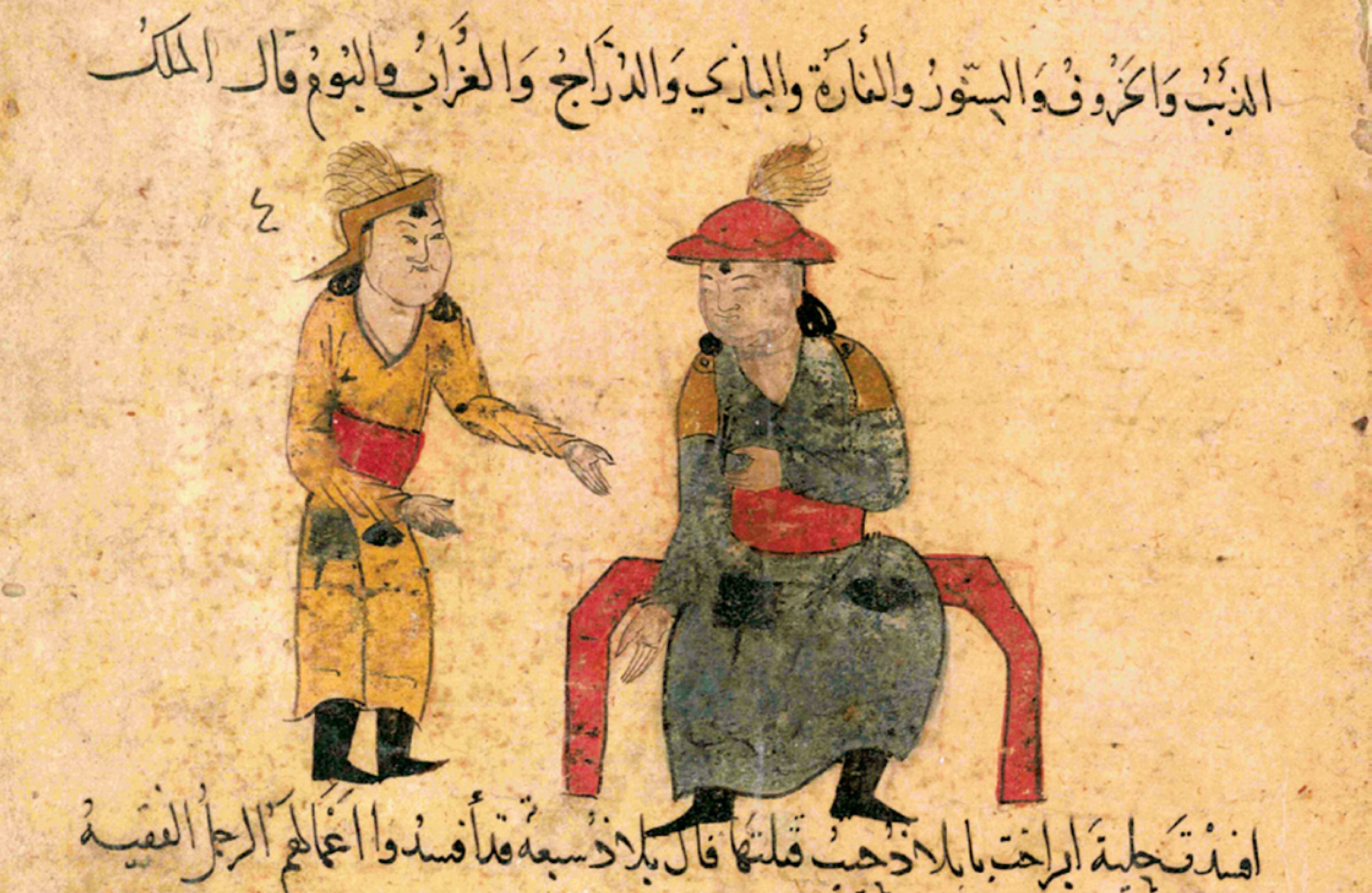
The King and Bilad, Fable of Shedram, Iblad and Irakht, Ibn al-Muqaffaʿ, Kalīla wa-Dimna, Rabat, BRR, ms. 3655, f.105

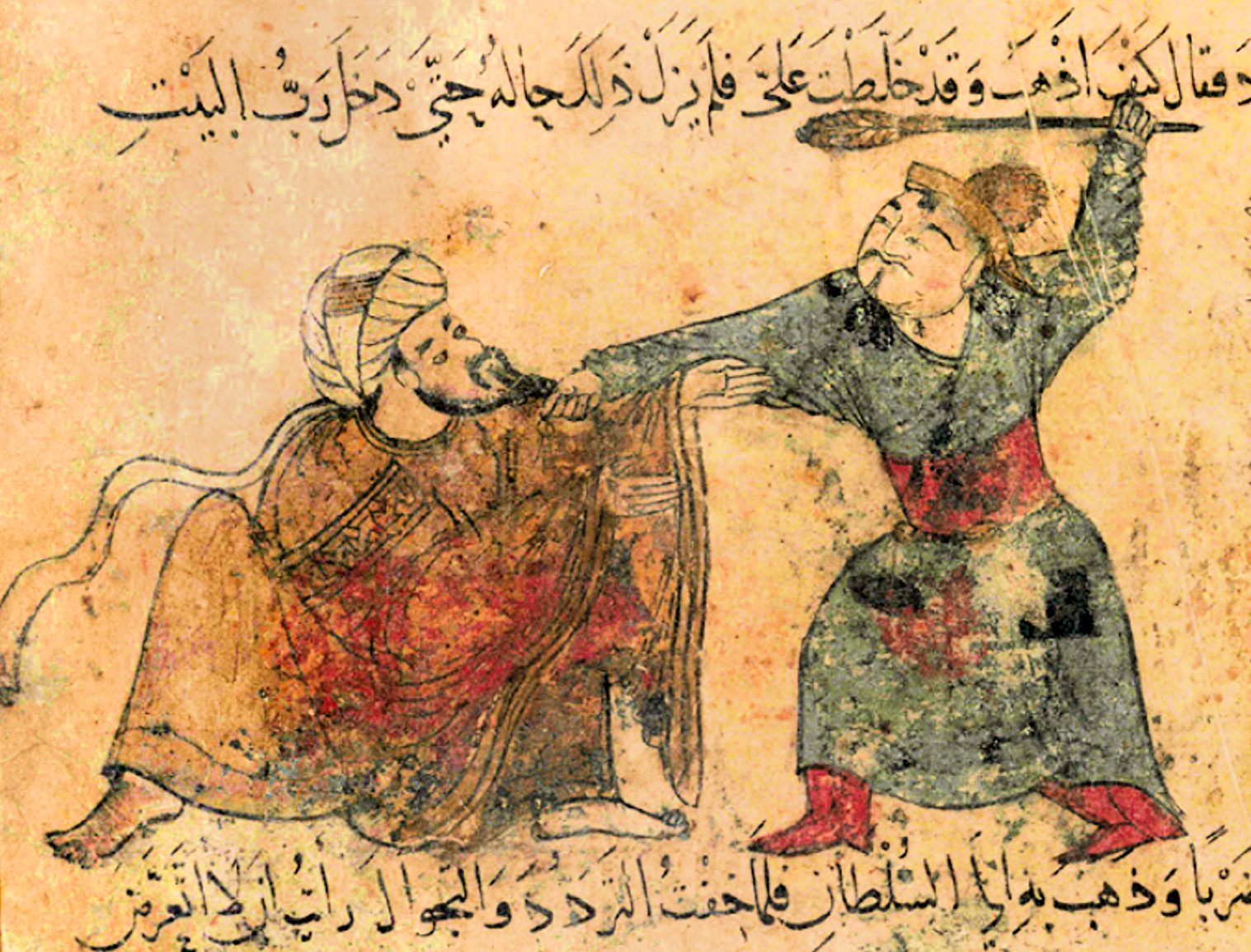
Fable of the lover caught by her husband, Ibn al-Muqaffaʿ, Kalīla wa-Dimna, Rabat, BRR, ms. 3655, f.11

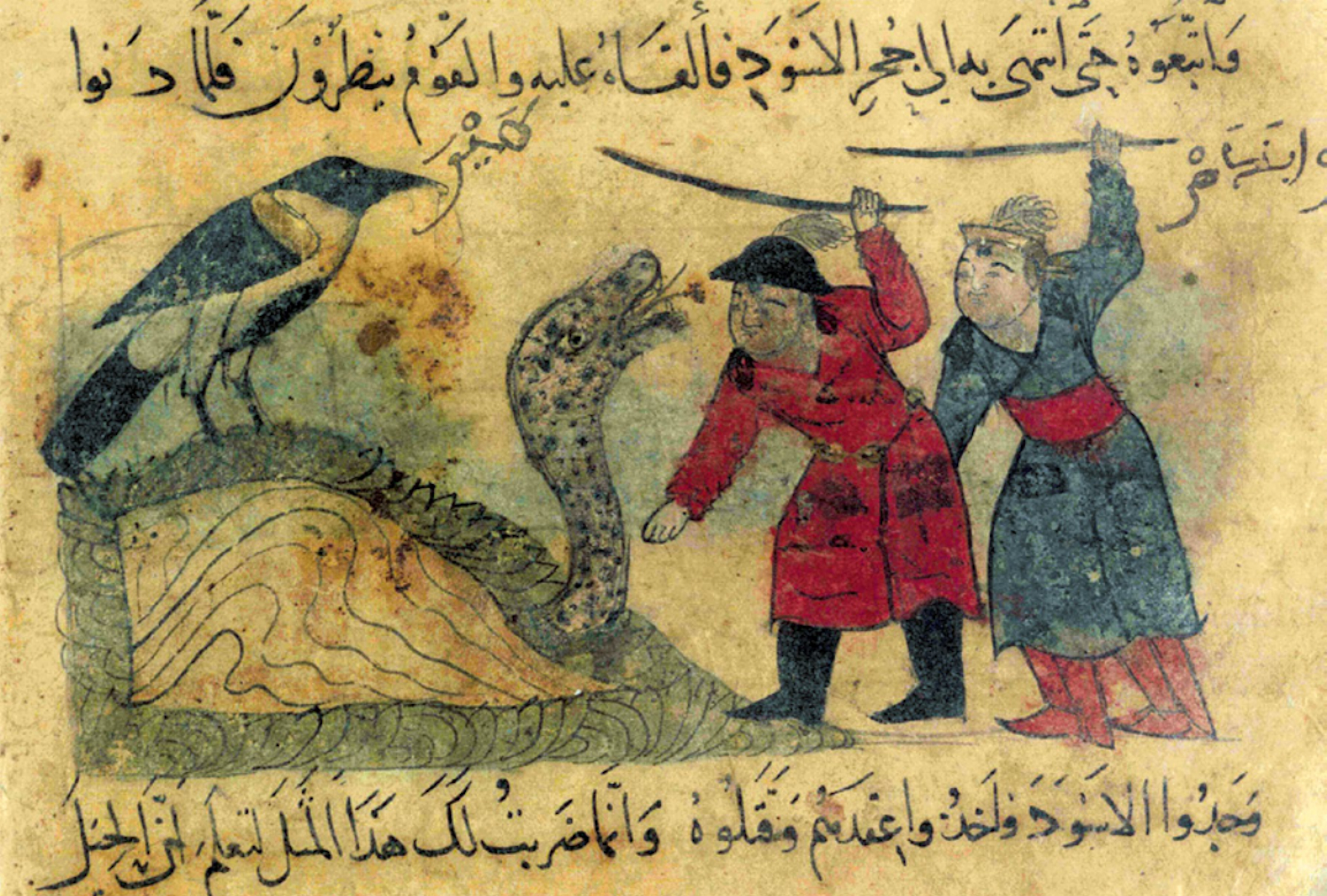
Men killing the cobra, Ibn al-Muqaffaʿ, Kalīla wa-Dimna, Rabat, BRR, ms. 3655, f.32v

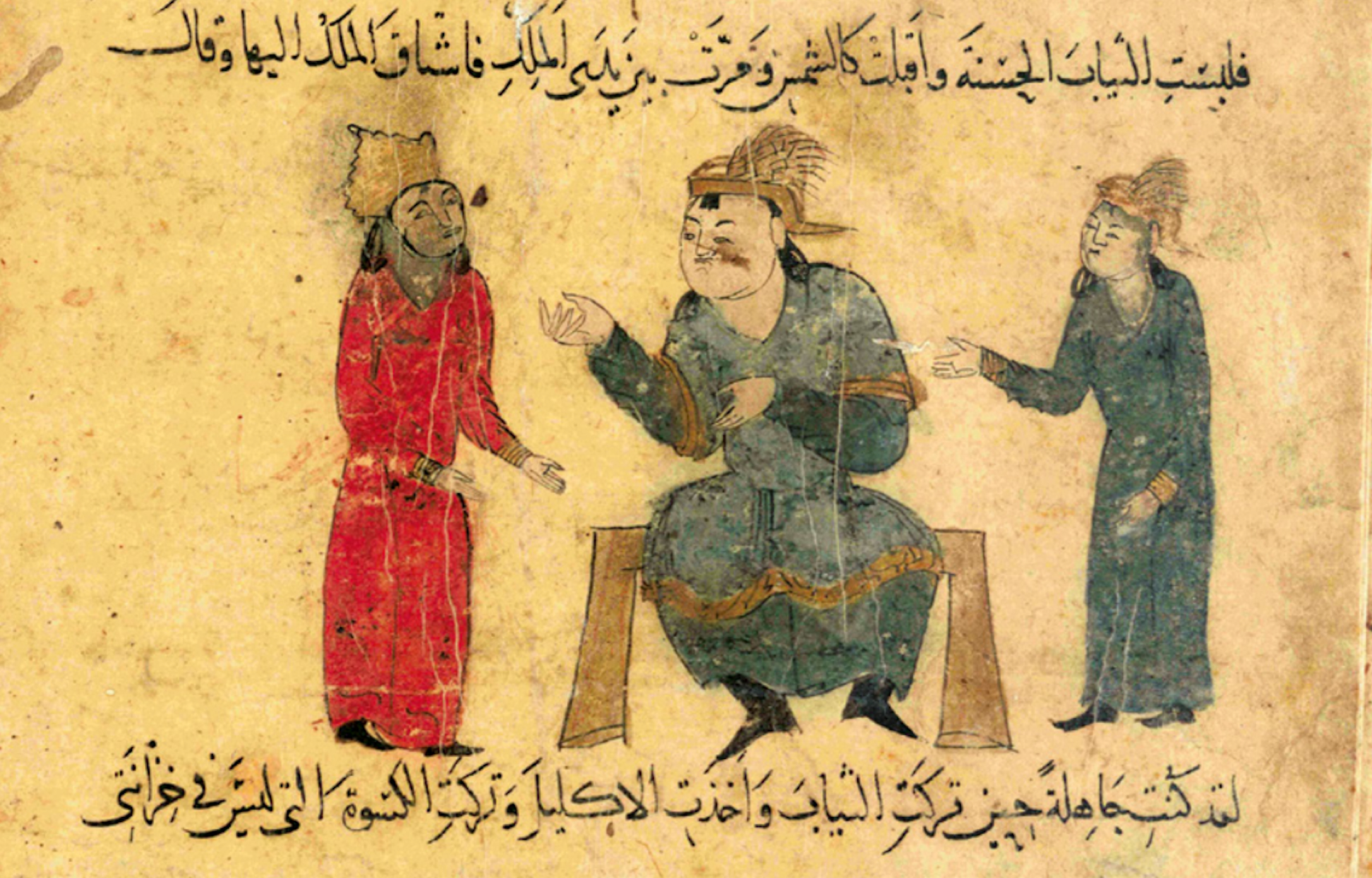
Fable of Shedram, Iblad and Irakht, Ibn al-Muqaffaʿ, Kalīla wa-Dimna, Rabat, BRR, ms. 3655, f.99v

=== Topkapı H.363 (1300) ===
Manuscript Kalila and Dimna, 1300 (Topkaki H.363). It is in Persian, and was created in Baghdad or Mosul c.1265-1280. It does not contain the "Chinese elements" usually associated with Mongol influences. The patron of the translation, the Ghaznavid ruler Bahram-Shah of Ghazna, is depicted in the frontispiece and in the text.

The Ghaznavid ruler Bahram-Shah of Ghazna is the one who, between 1143 and 1146, commissioned Abu'l-Ma'ali Nasrallah to translate the Kalila wa Dimna from Arabic to Persian.

This manuscript is the earliest known manuscript of Kalīla wa-Dimna in the Persian language.

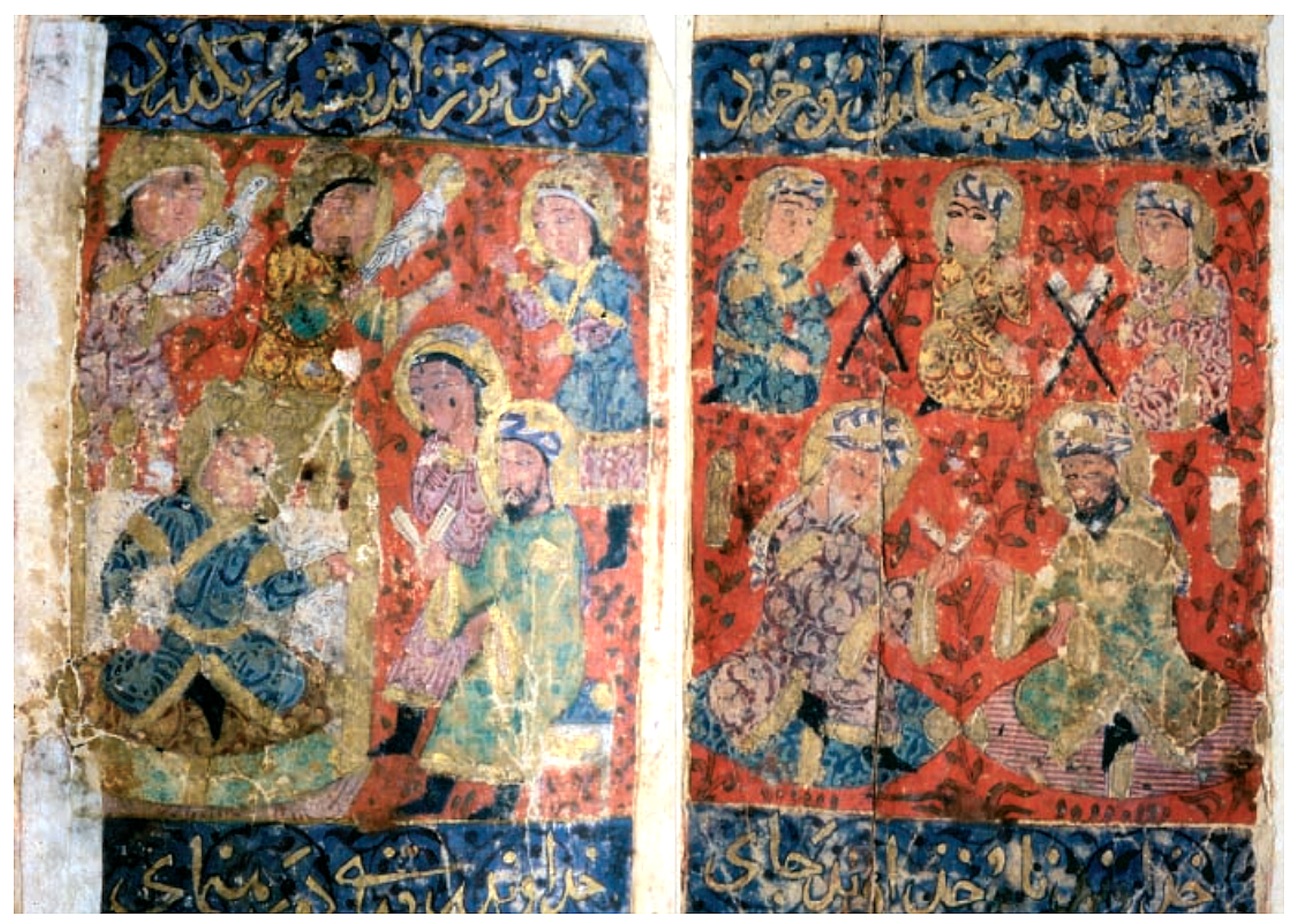
Frontispiece, with scenes of enthronement and presentation of the book

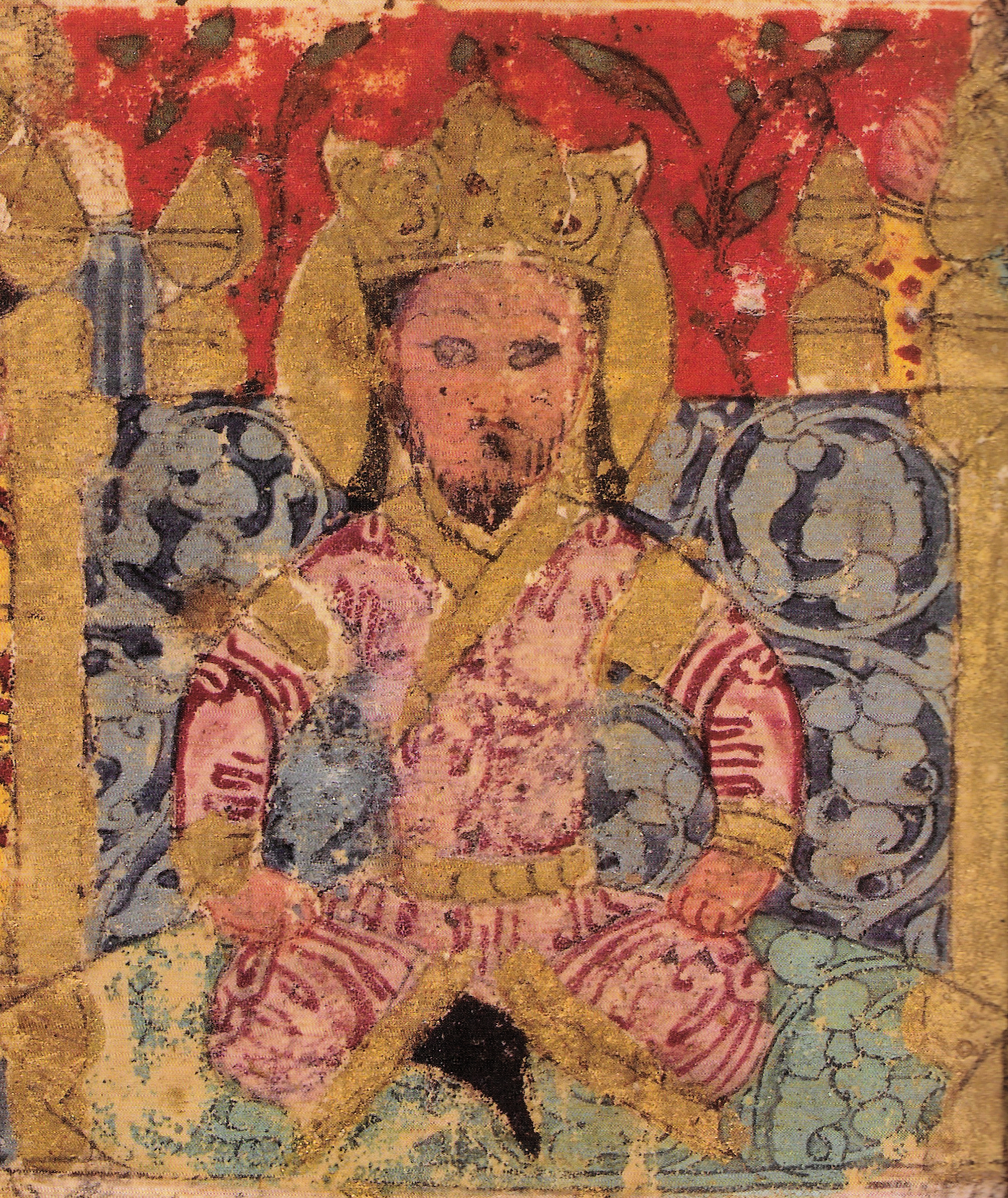
Portrait of Ghaznavid ruler Bahram Shah

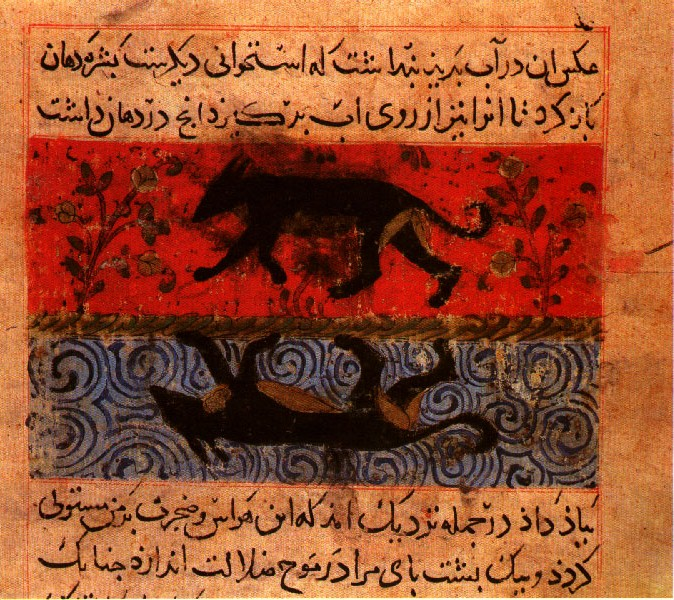
Animal scene showing a dog and his reflection in the water

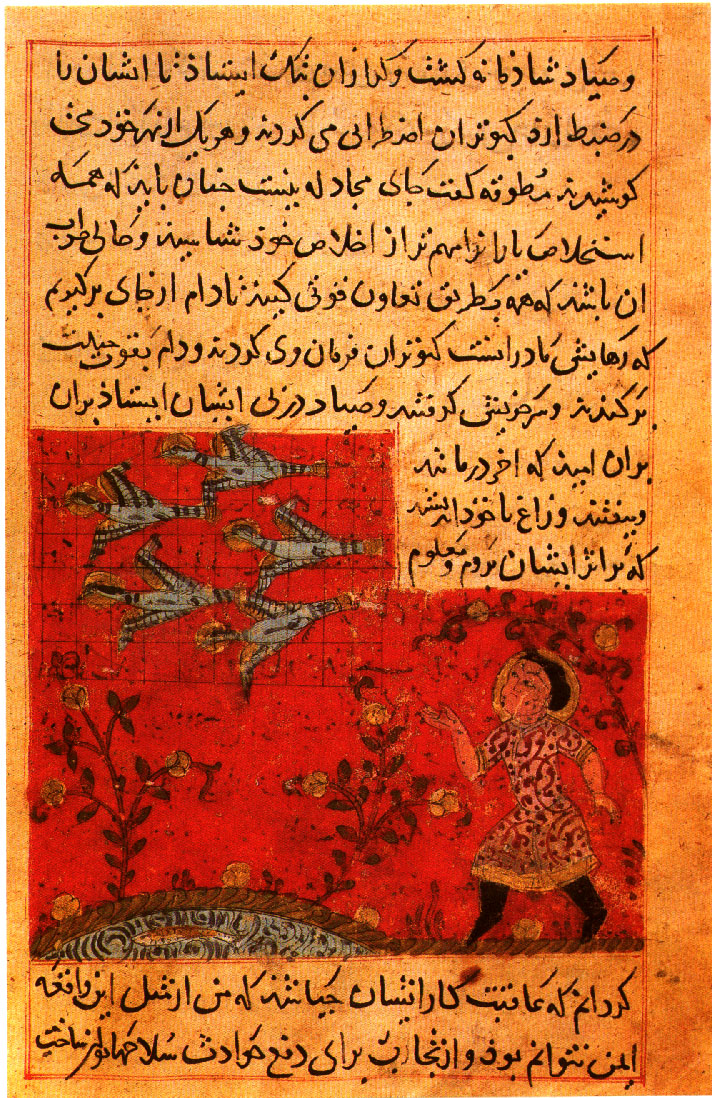
A man with birds

=== A616: Arab 616/München 616 (1300-1310) ===
Manuscript Kalila and Dimna, 1300-1310 (BSB, Cod. Arab. 616). Another Kalila and Dimna manuscript is dated 1300-1310, in the Arabic language. It was created in Egypt or Syria, and is now located in the Bavarian State Library (Bayerische Staatsbibliothek) in Munich, Germany.(BSB, Cod. Arab. 616).

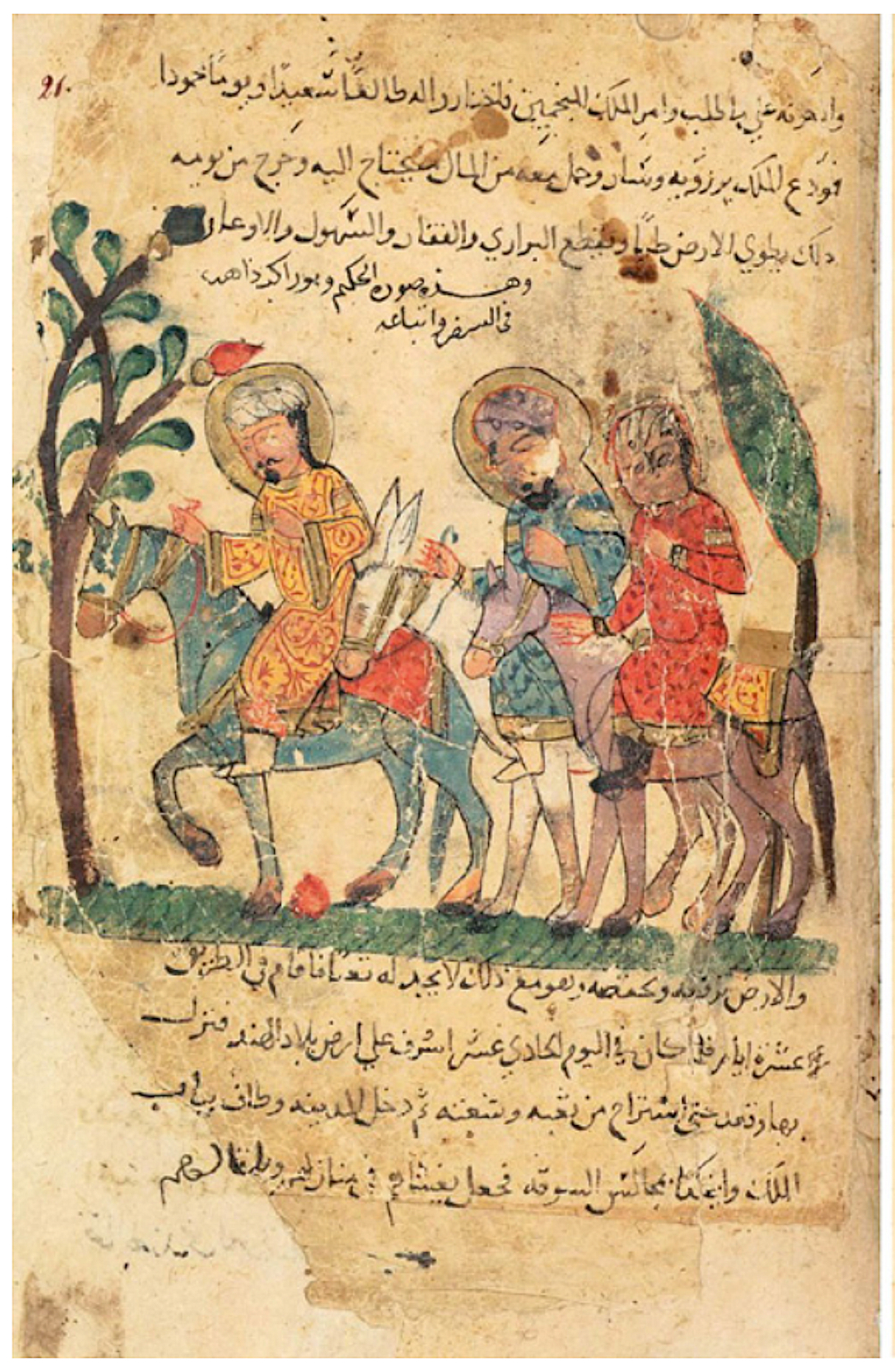
Burzoy and physicians setting off on their journey. Ibn al-Muqaffaʿ, Kalīla wa-Dimna; Egypt or Syria, ca. 1300–10. BSB, Cod. Arab. 616, fol. 21r.

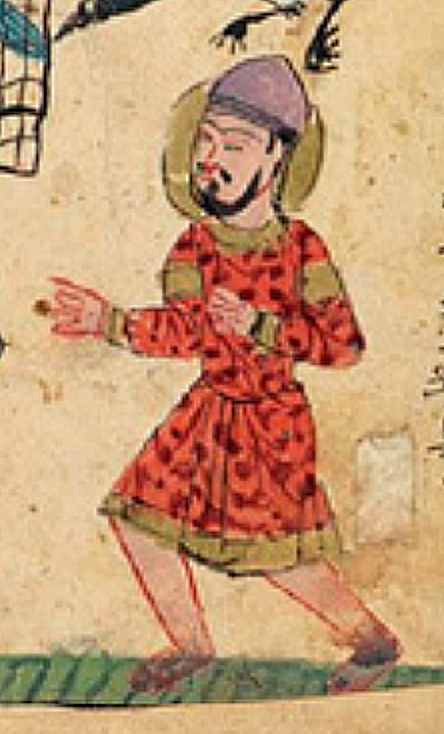
Pigeons fly off while still in the net, fol. 76v (detail)

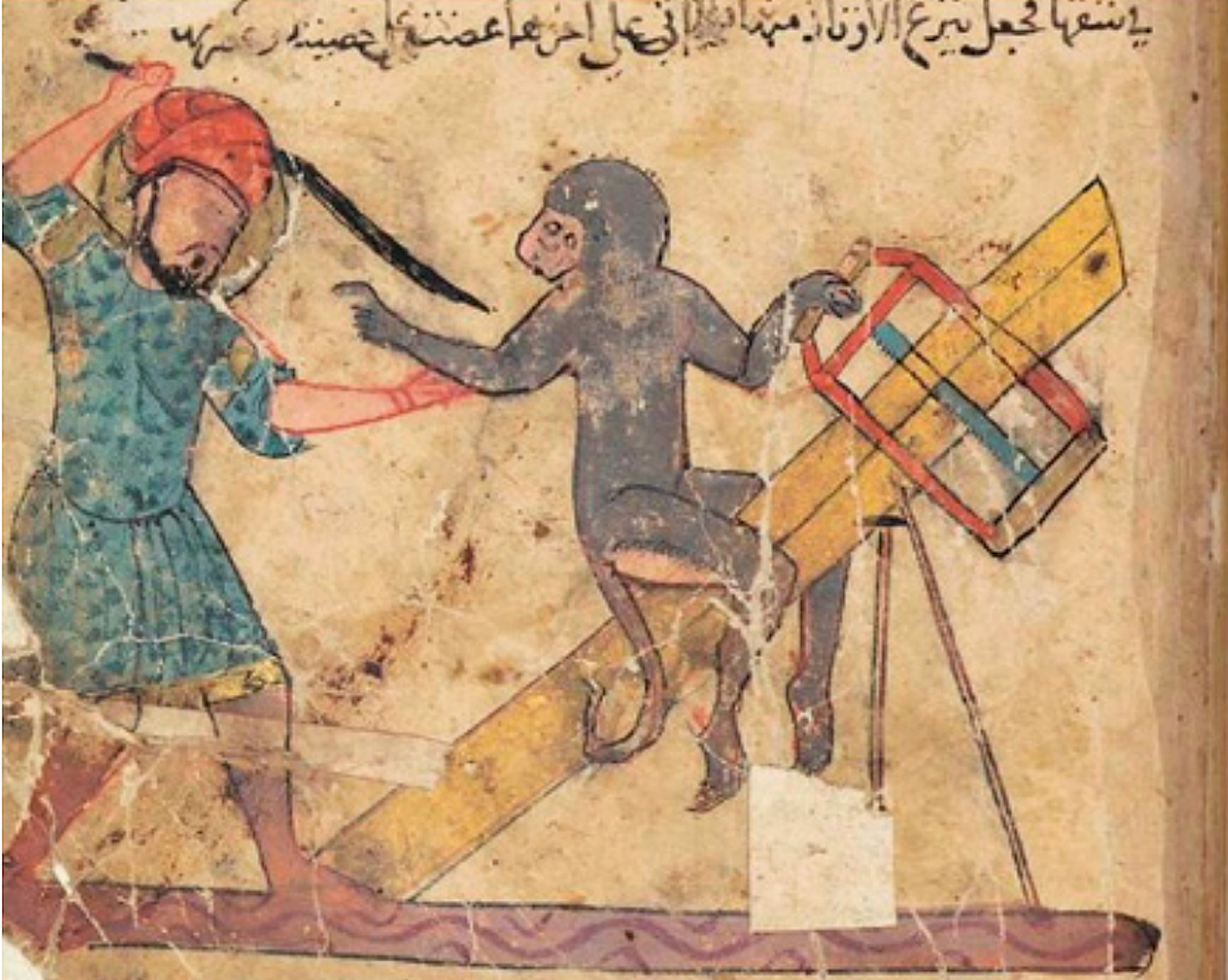
The Monkey on the Carpenter’s Work Horse”, fol. 43r (detail)

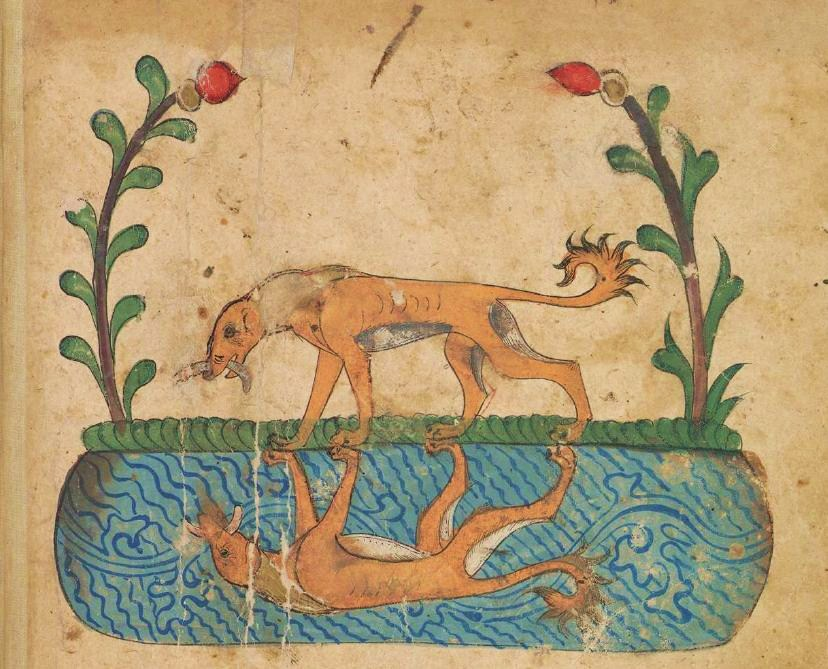
Reflection in a pond

=== British Library Or.13506 (1307) ===
Manuscript Kalila and Dimna, 1307, Shiraz (British Library Or.13506). Attributed to Iran (possibly Shiraz), dated 707 (1307-8).

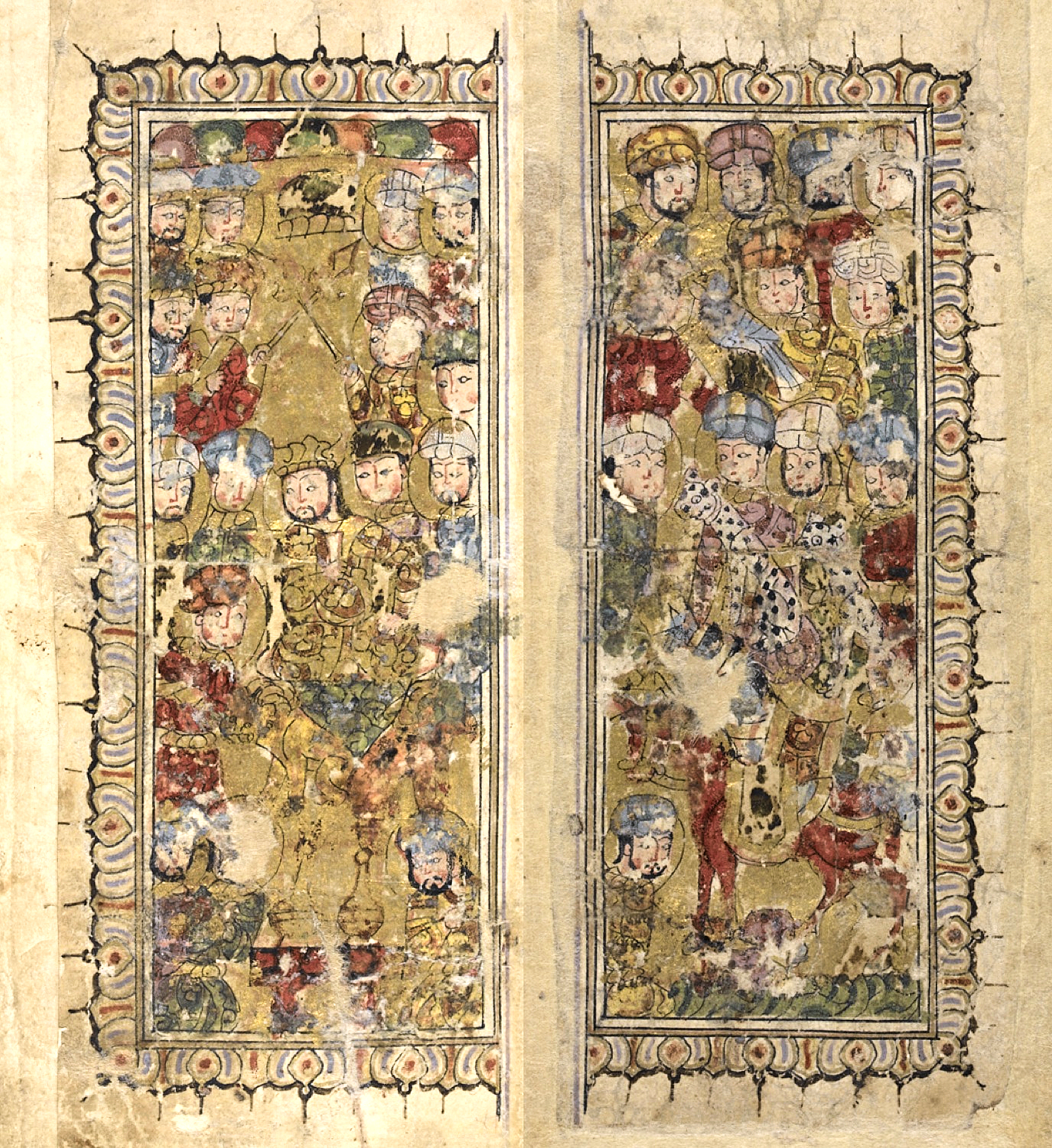
Frontispiece

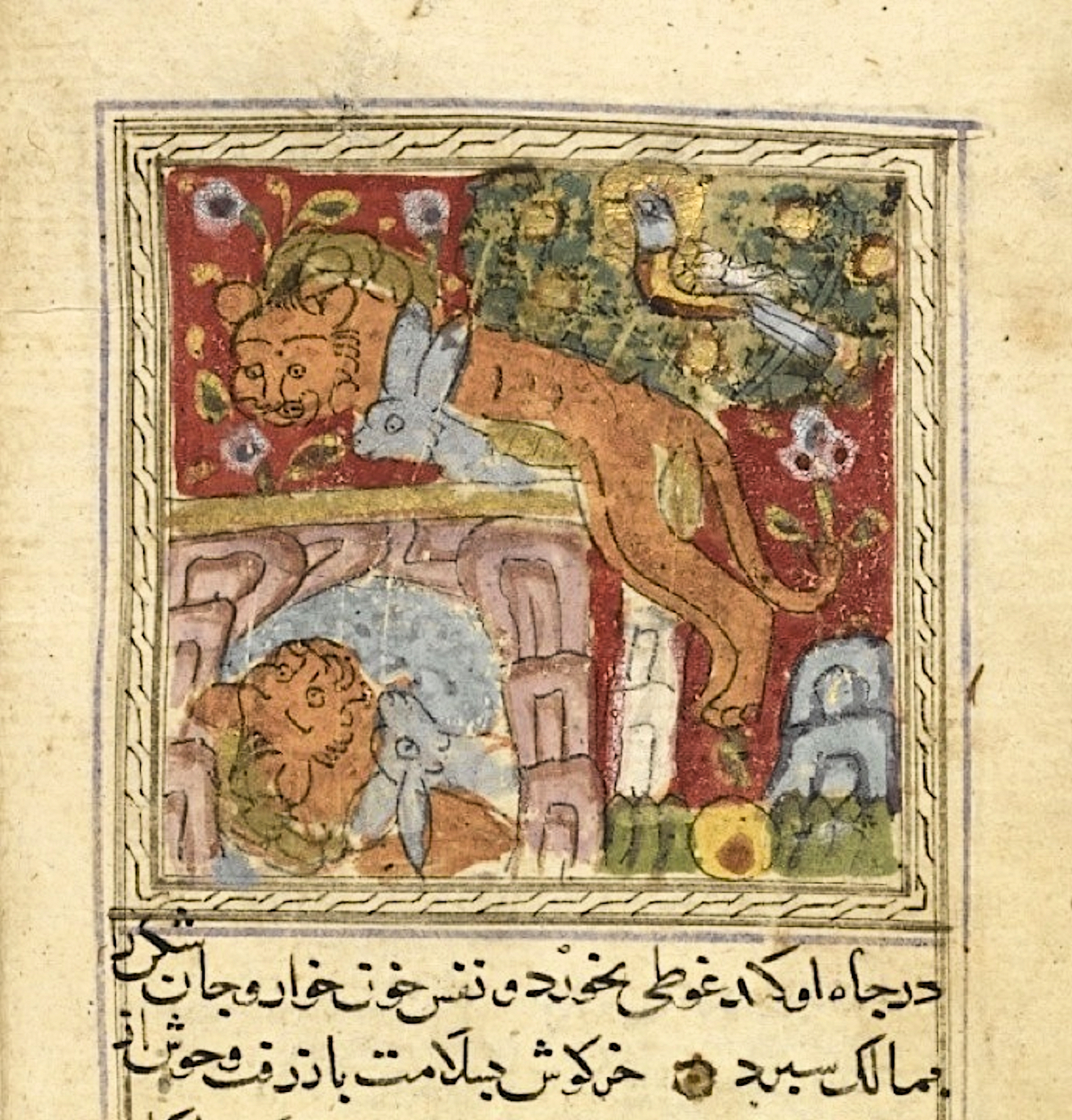
The hare who tricks the lion into drowning by attacking his own reflection in the well

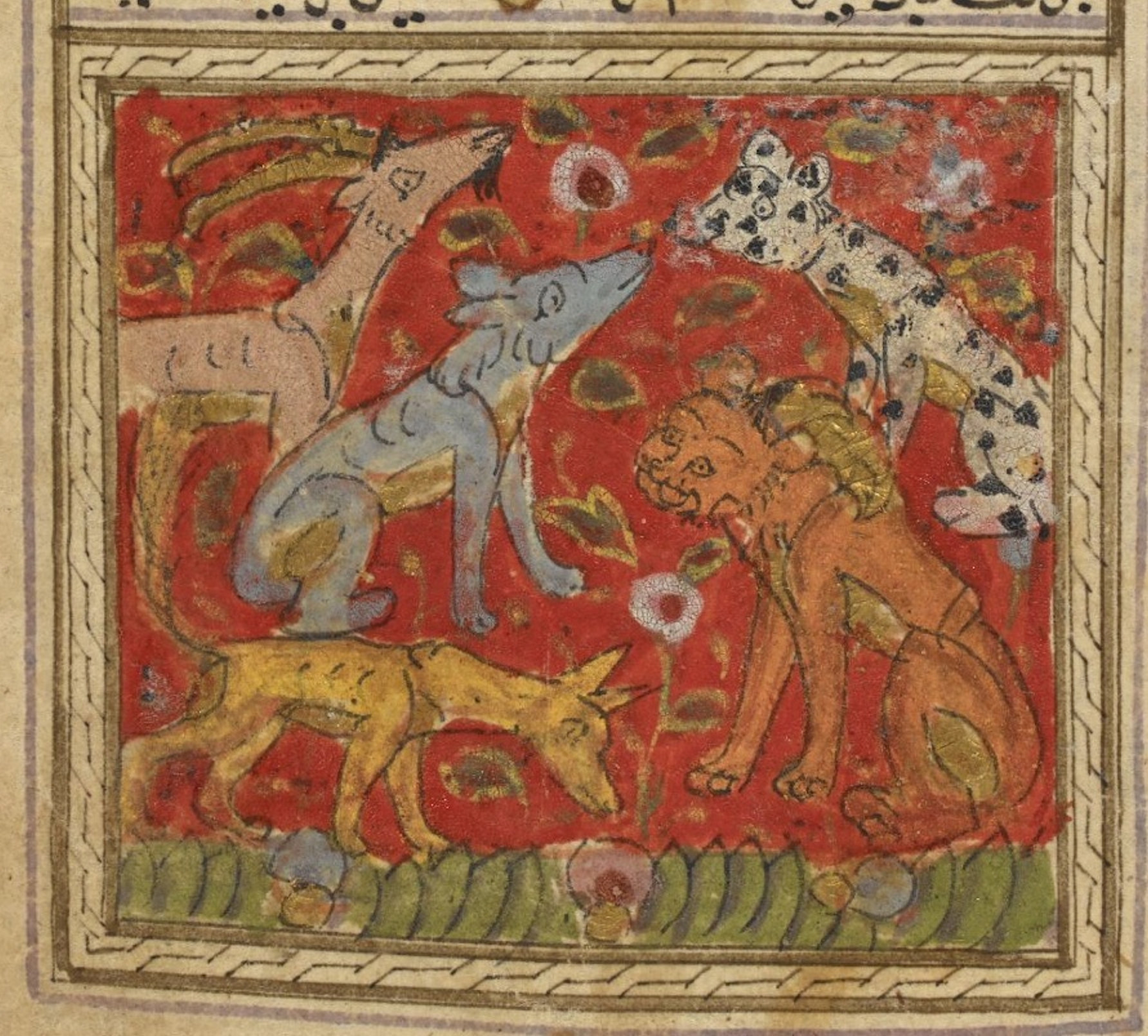
The lion with its courtiers, leopard, wolf, gazelle and Dimnah the jackal

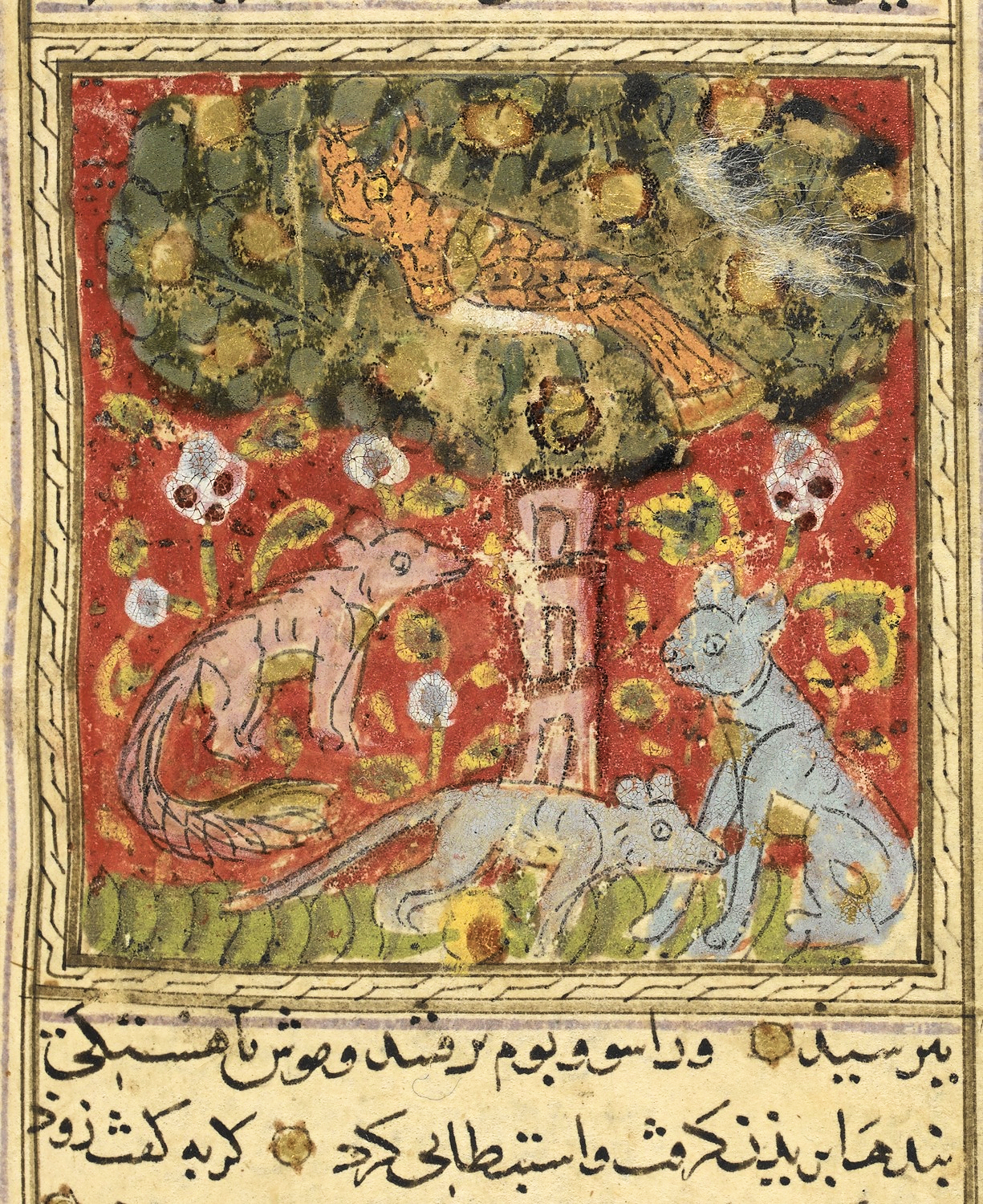
The rat approaches the trapped cat. Watching, ready to pounce, are an owl and a weasel

=== BNF/Latin 8504 (1313) ===
French translation of Kalila wa Dimna, Raymond de Béziers, dated to 1313 CE. Now in the Bibliothèque Nationale de France (BNF Latin 8504).

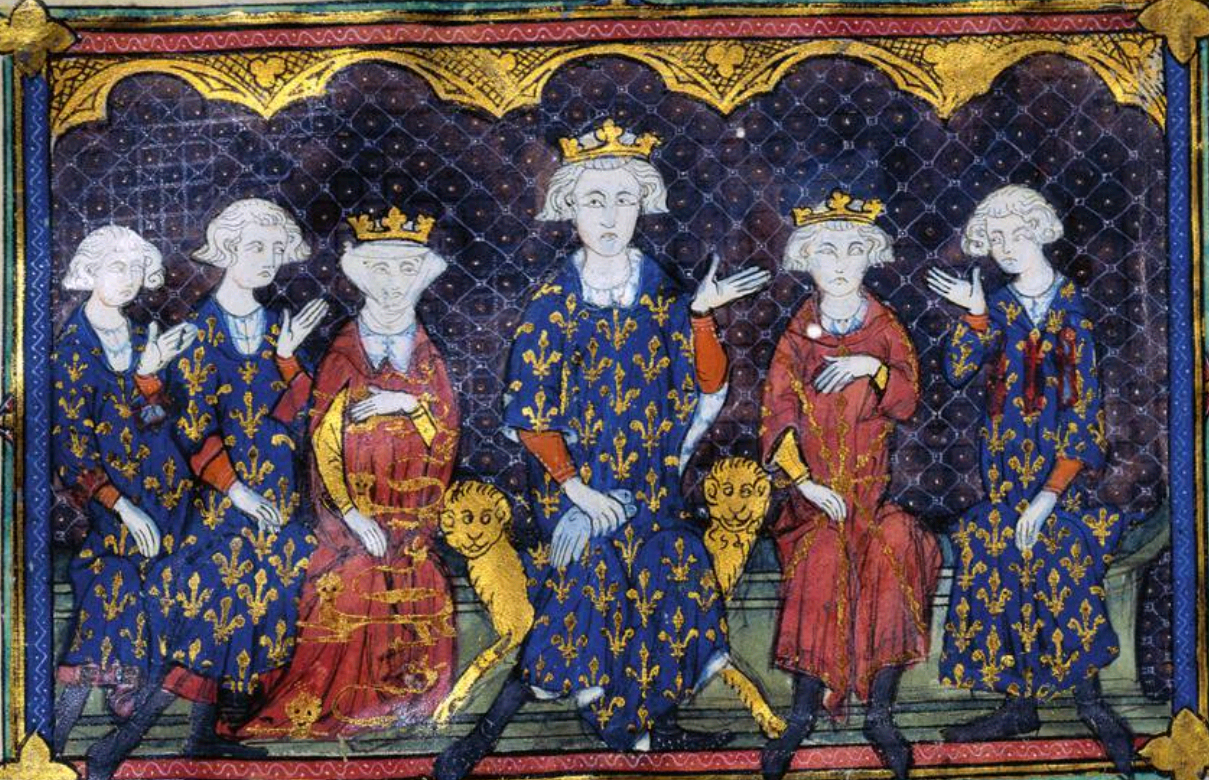
Kalila wa Dimna BNF Latin 8504. Ruler: Philip IV and family.

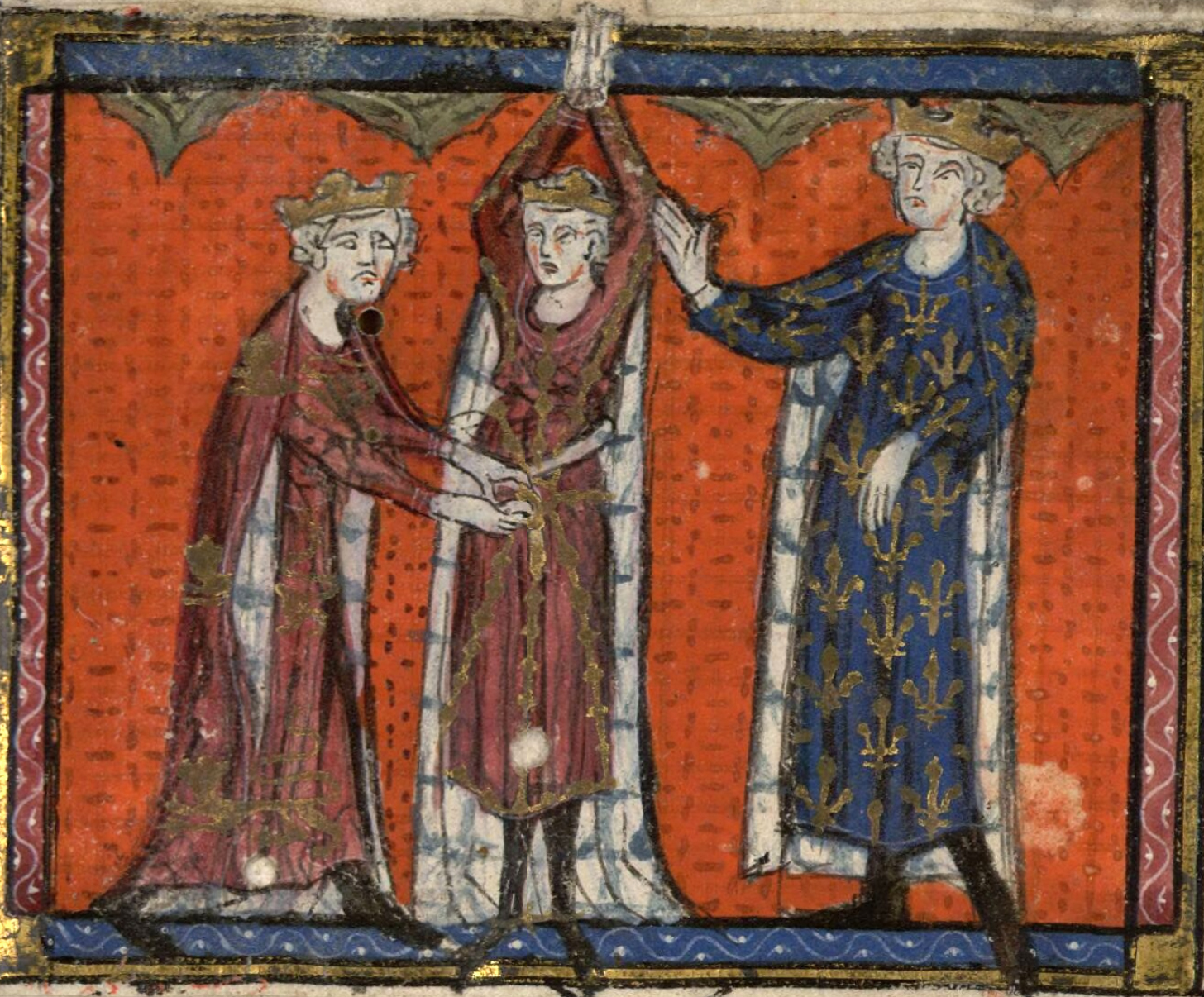
Kalila wa Dimna BNF Latin 8504. Regnal scene

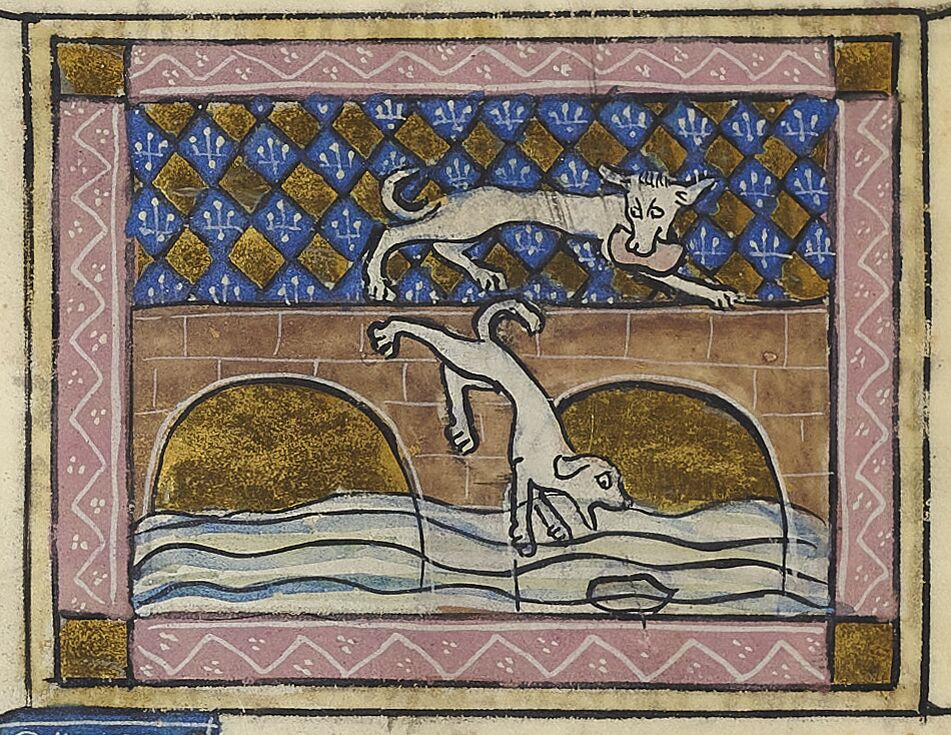
Kalila wa Dimna BNF Latin 8504, folio 23v. Animal scene.

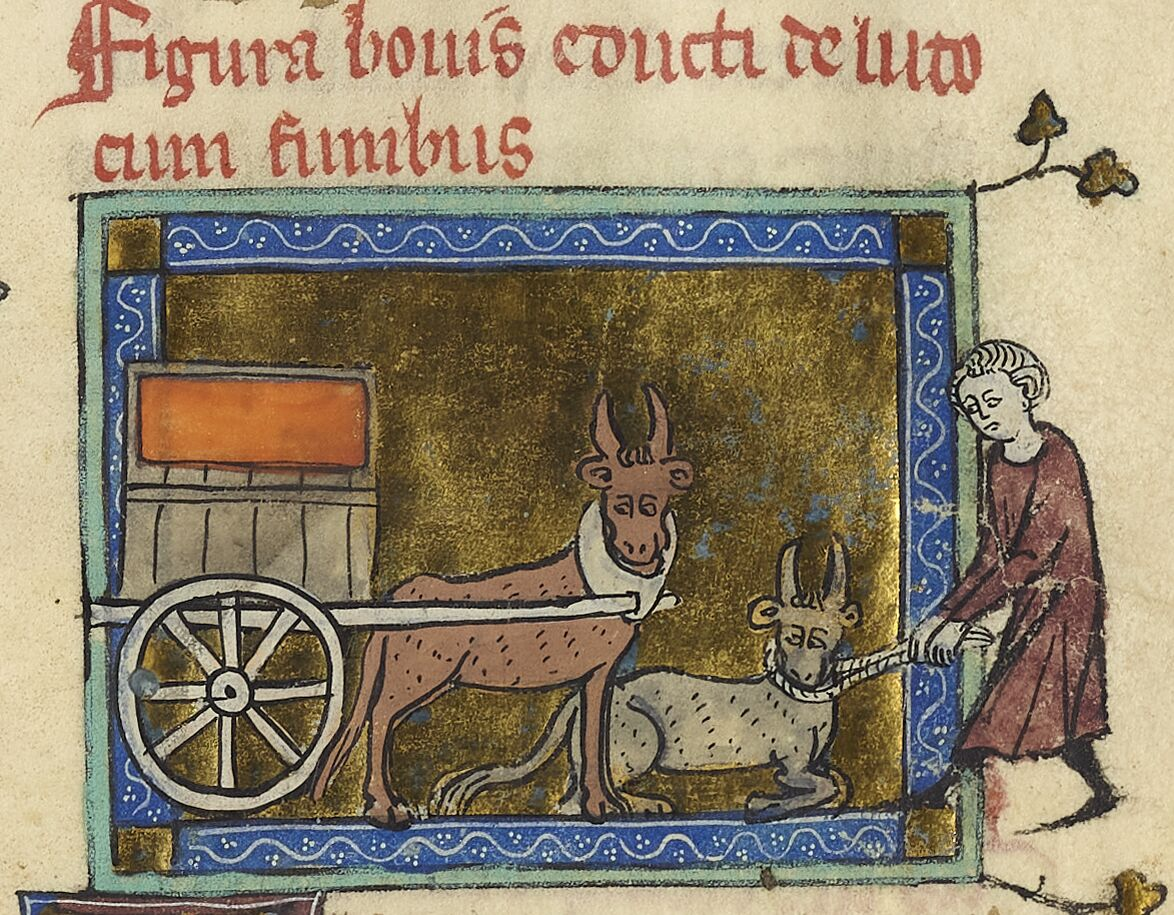
Kalila wa Dimna BNF Latin 8504, folio 26r. Animal scene.

=== P400: Pococke 400 (1354) ===
Located at Bodleian Libraries, University of Oxford in Oxford, England. Creation date: Hijri: 25 Rabīʿ II 755/Gregorian: 19 May 1354. Dated in colophon, fol. 152v. Manuscript has some parts missing (refer to Kalila wa-Dimna Edition webpage)

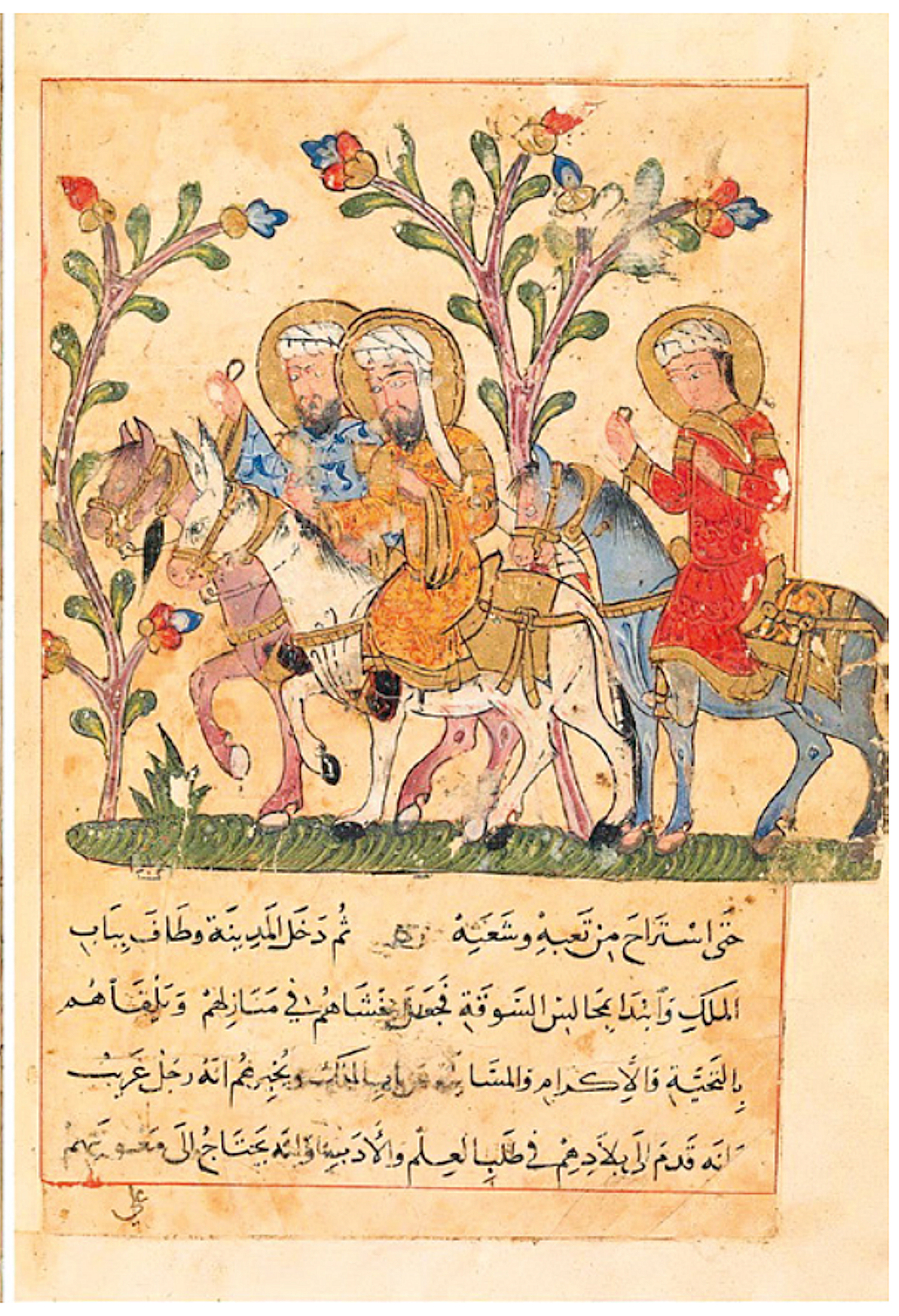
Burzoy and physicians setting off on their journey

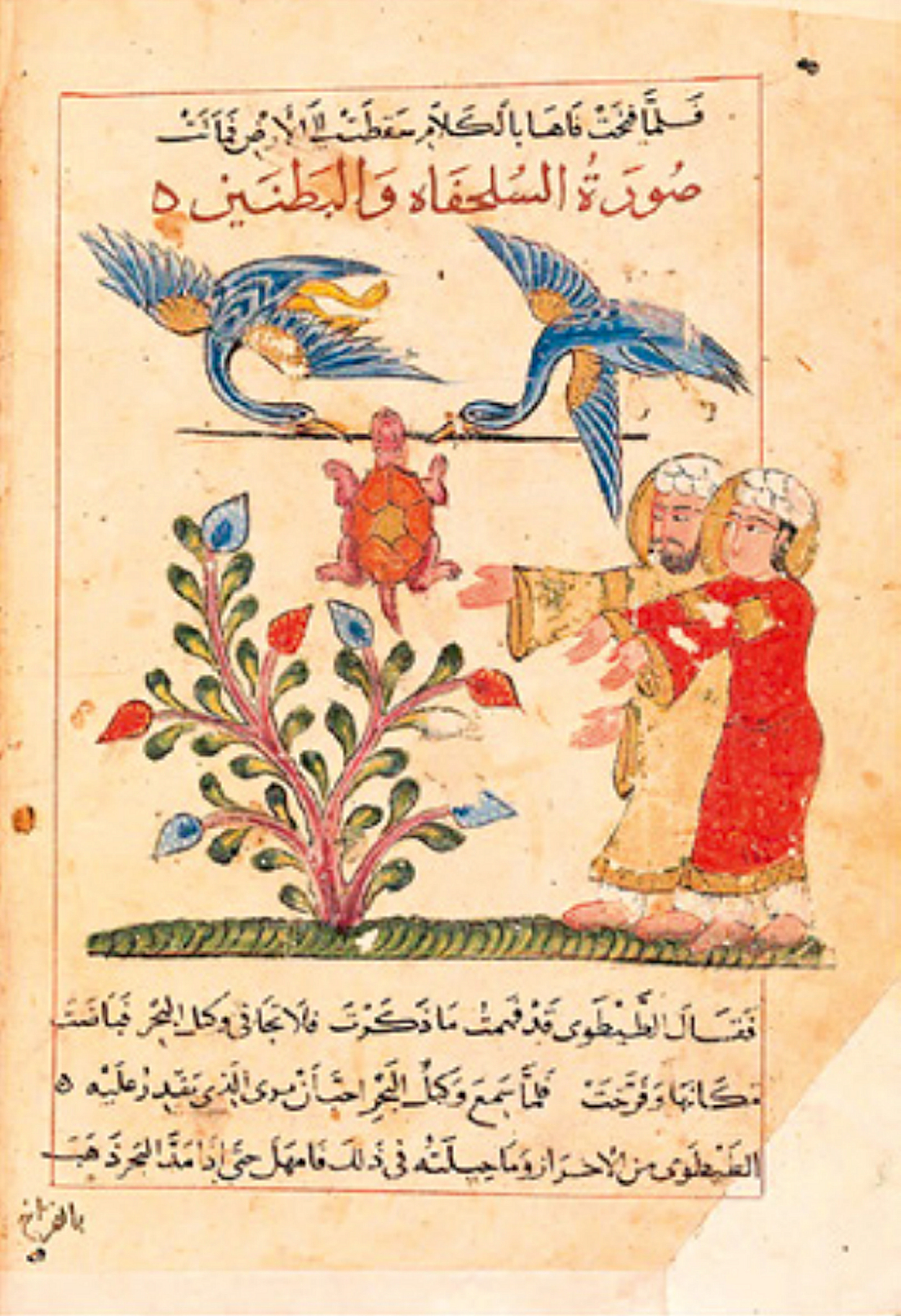
Geese carrying the tortoise in flight

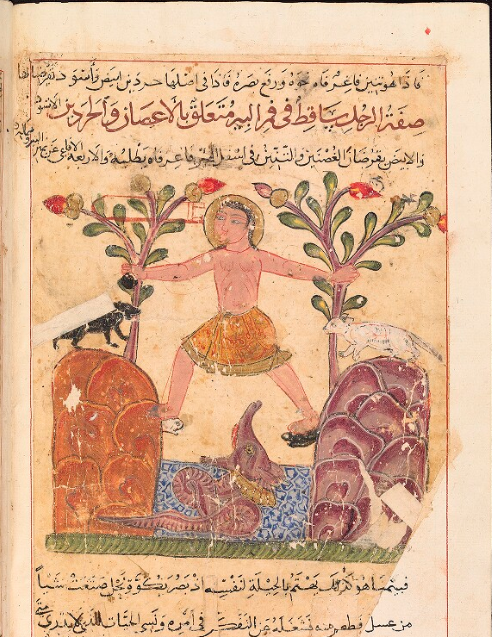

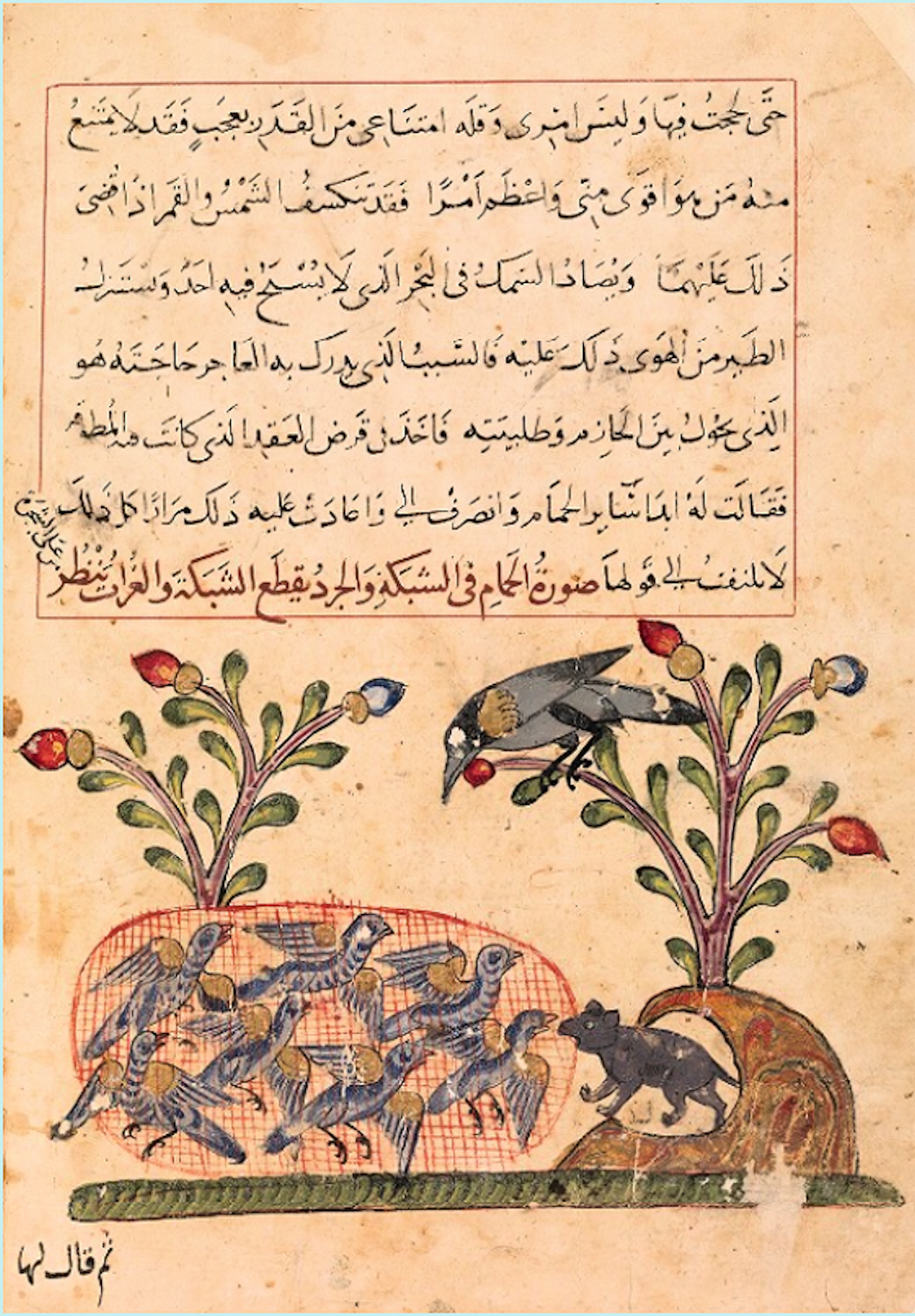
File:Tale of the Four Friends

=== Istanbul University Library, MS 1422 (1370-74) ===
Manuscript Kalila and Dimna (1370-74). A Jalayirid Kalīla wa-Dimna, dated c. 1370-74 in Tabriz. Tentatively attributed to Ahmad Musa, it was created under the sponsorship of Shaykh Uways Jalayir.

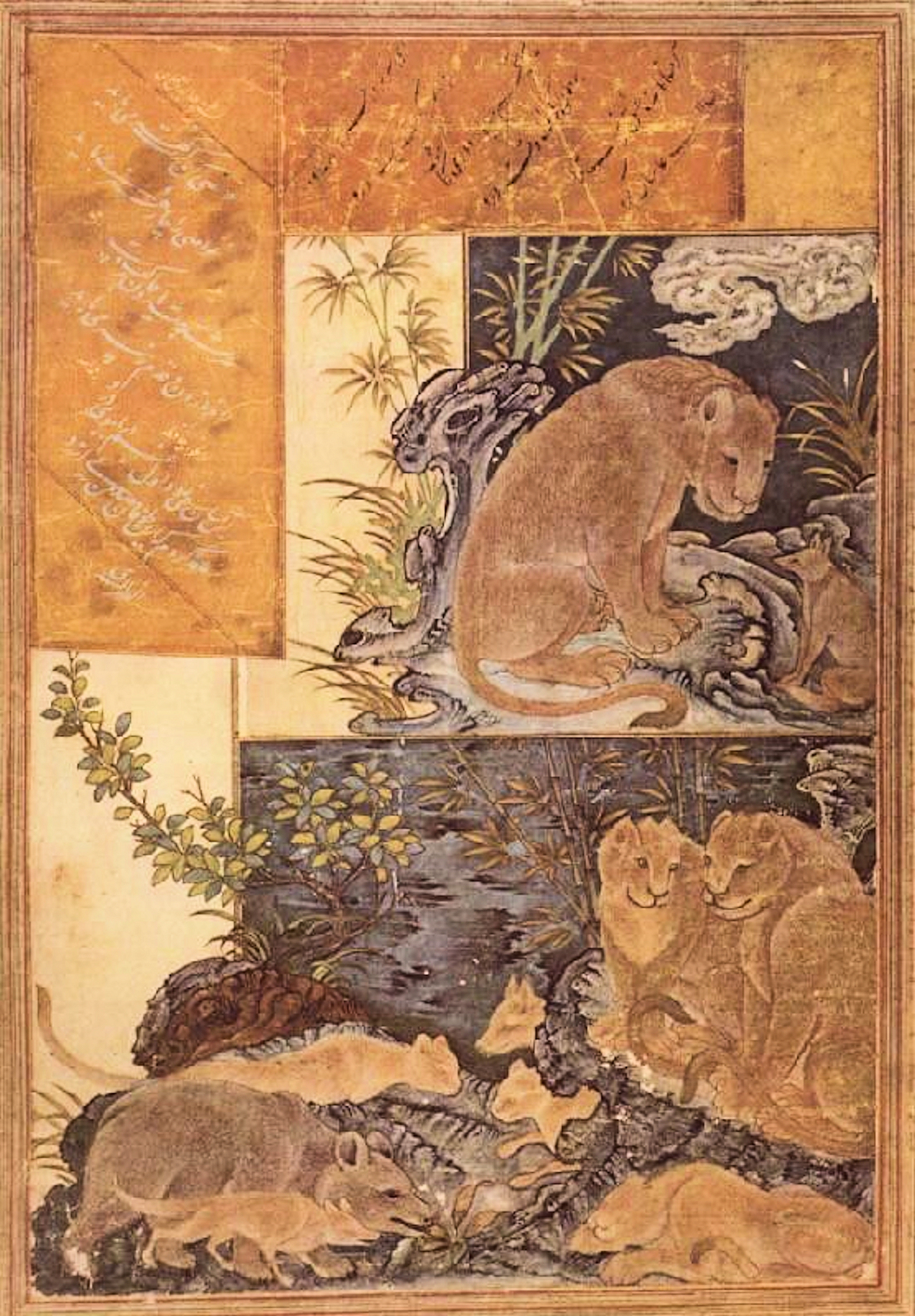
Kalila and Dimna

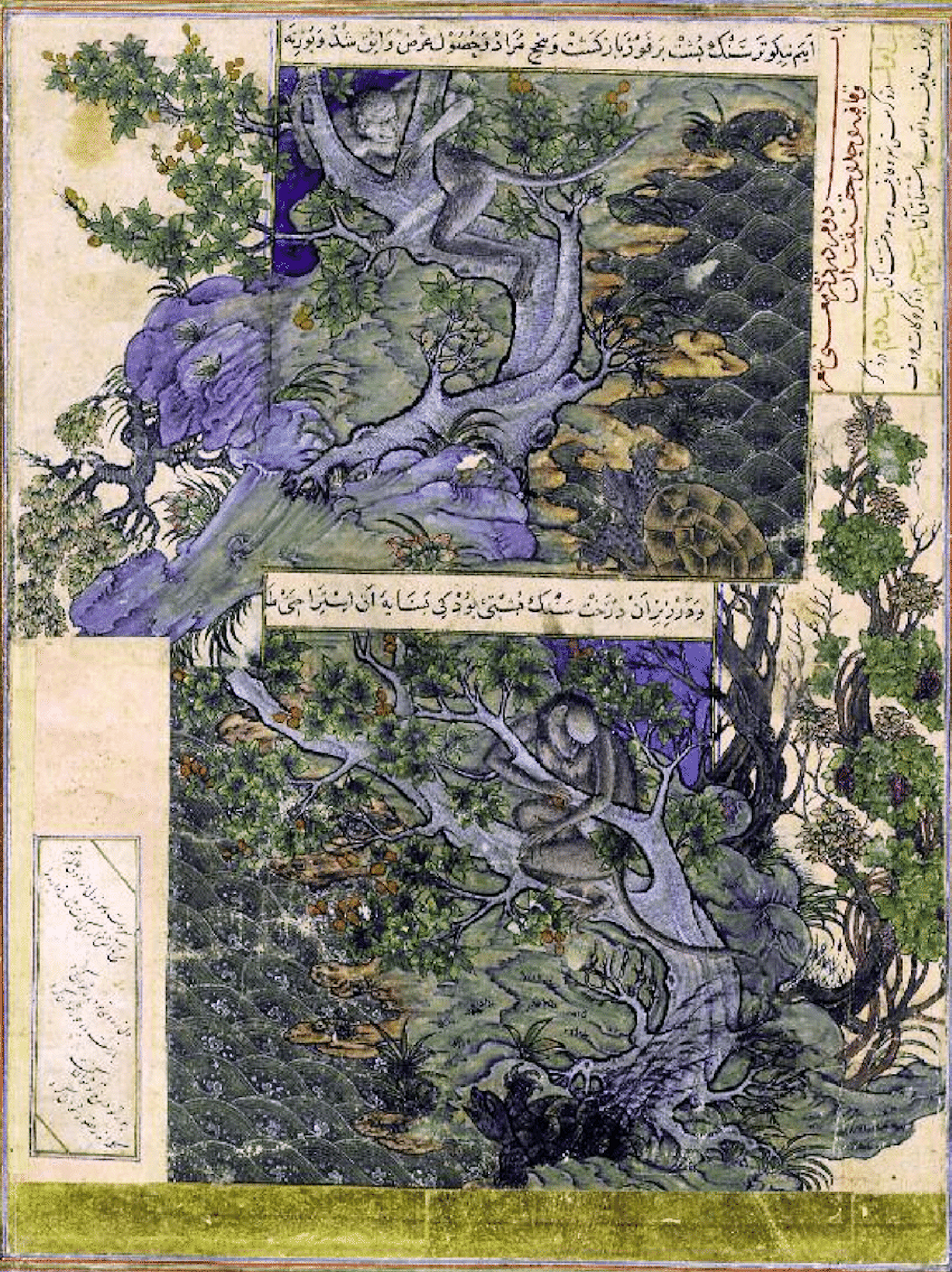
The Monkey and the Tortoise

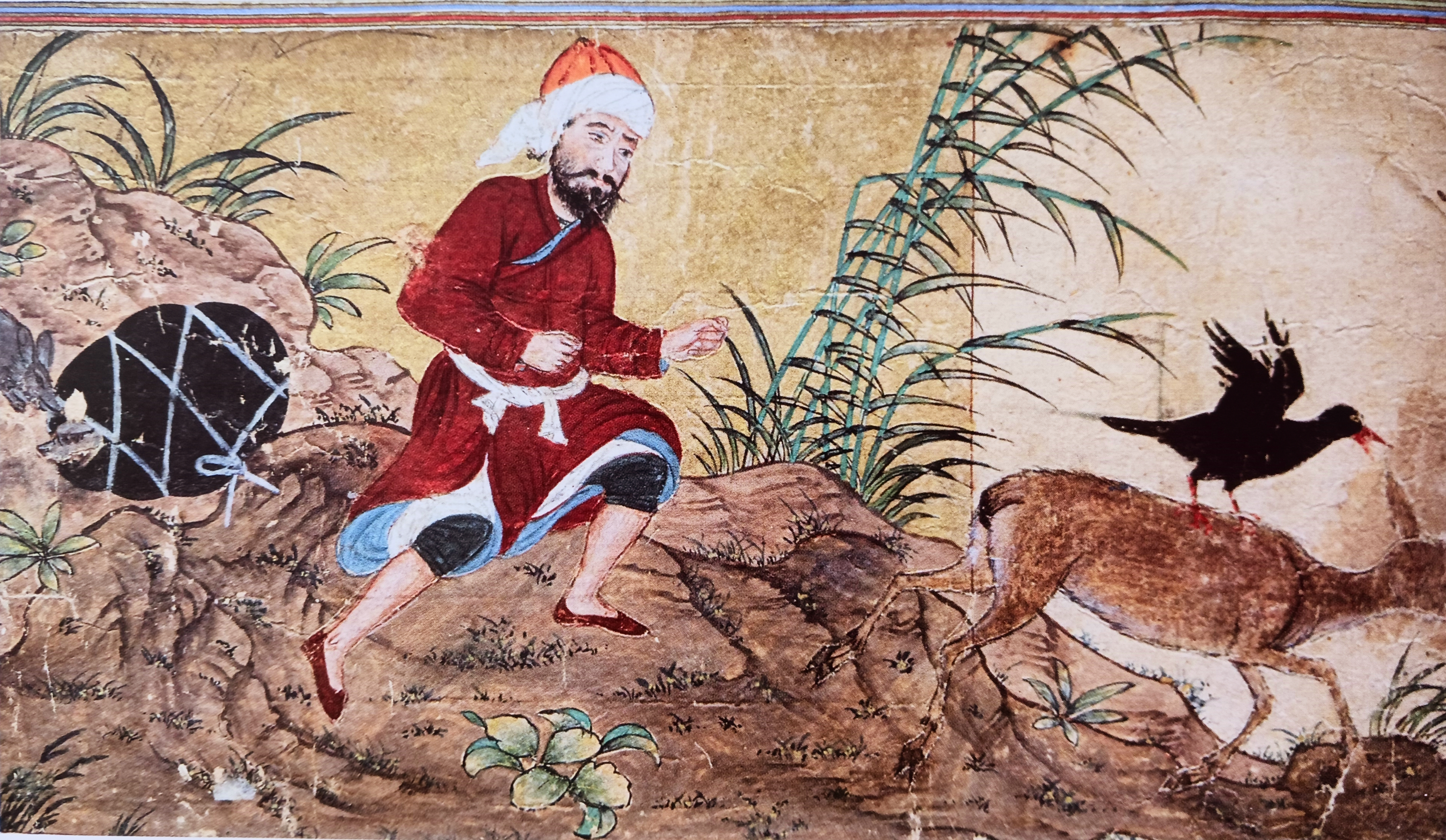
The hunter and the gazelle

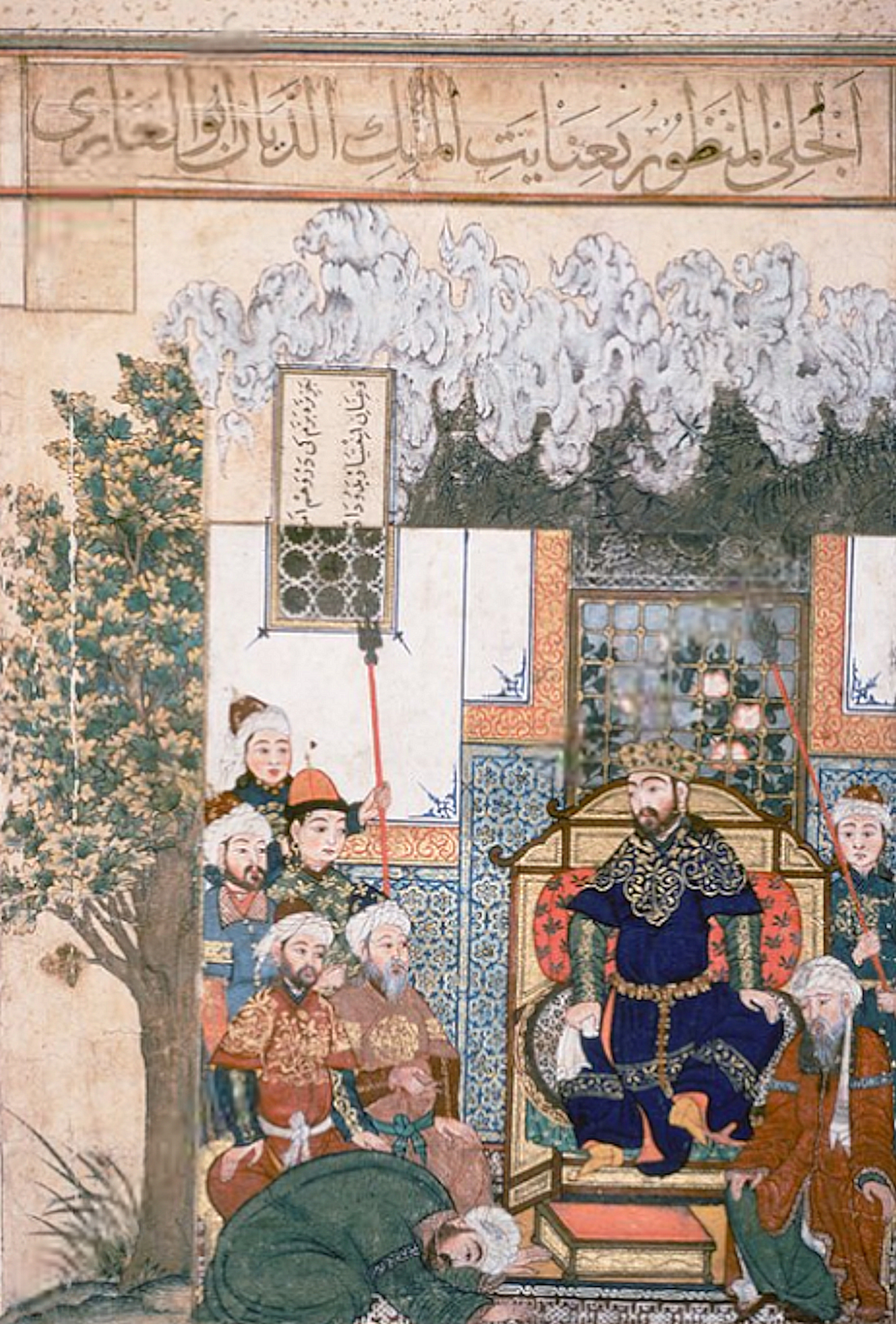
The Persian physician Borzyua before Khosrau (Chosroes) I Anushviran

=== CCCP578: Parker 578 ===
Located in Parker Library at Corpus Christi College, Cambridge. Creation date: Hijri: 20 Jumādā I 7?1/Gregorian: 1444. Contains 120 illustrations. Manuscript is complete/restored.

=== A4095: Ayasofya 4095 ===
Located in Süleymaniye Library in Istanbul, Turkey. Creation date: Hijri: 1 Jumādā II 618/Gregorian: 23 July 1221 Gregorian. Manuscript is complete/restored.

=== R2536: Riyadh 2536 ===
Located in King Faisal Center for Research and Islamic Studies in Riyadh, Saudi Arabia. Creation date: Hijri: 26 Ṣafar 747/Gregorian: 18 June 1346. Dated in colophon on folio 156v. Manuscript is partially restored.

=== Arabe 3471/P3471: Paris 3471 ===
Located at Bibliothèque Nationale de France (Archives et Manuscrits) in Paris, France. Creation date: Hijri: 23 Rabīʿ II 1053/Gregorian: 11 July 1643. Dated in colophon on folio 189r.

=== Other editions ===
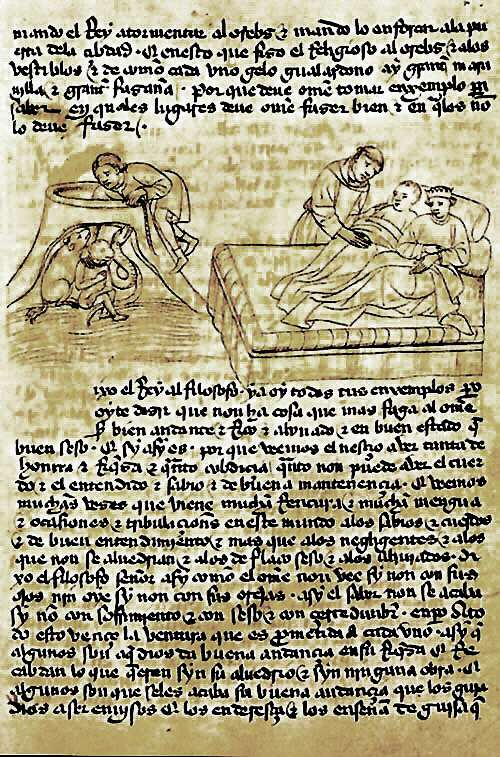
Spanish manuscript, workshop of Frederick of Castile, 1251–1261

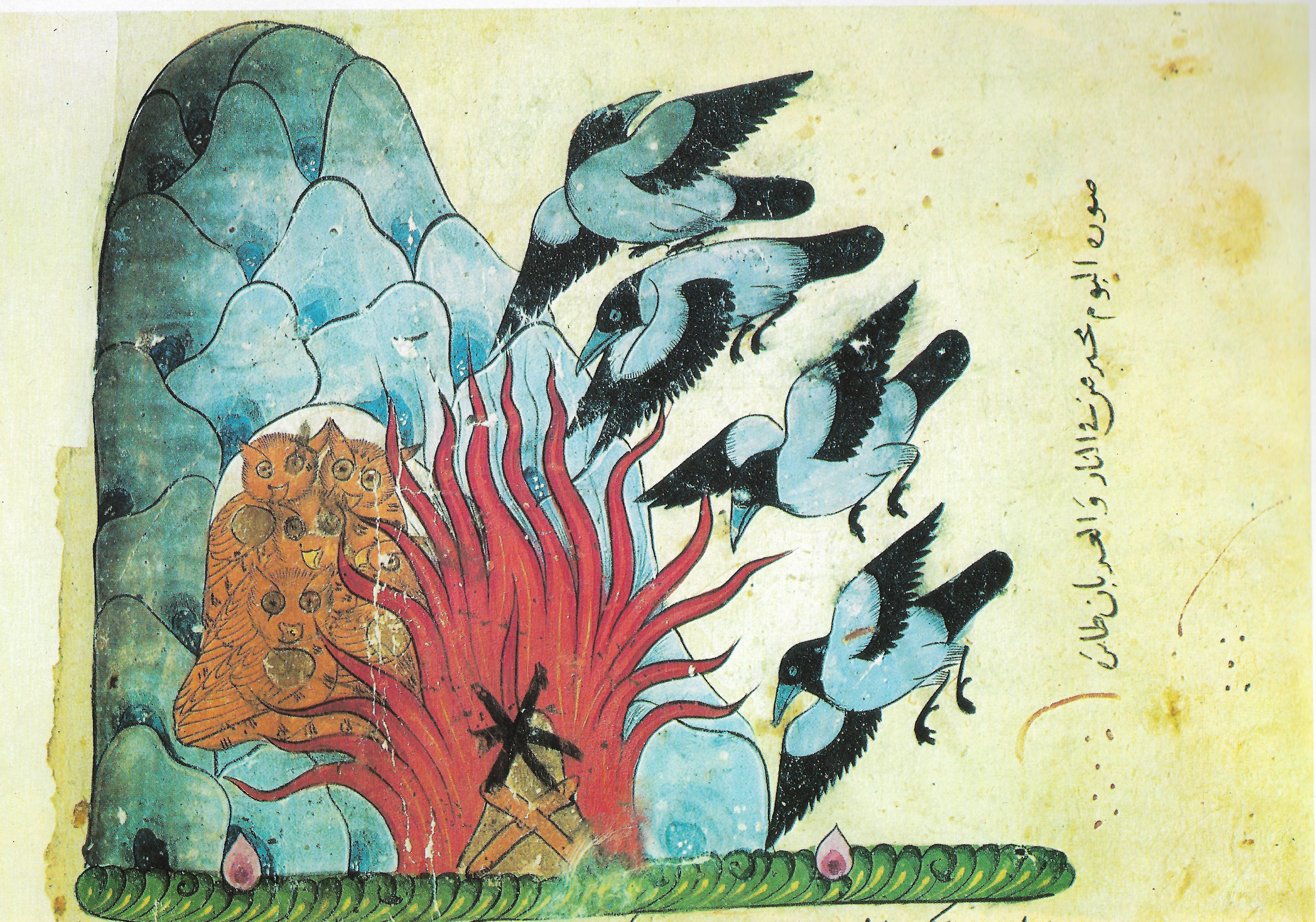
The crows and the owls. Syrian painter, c. 1300–1325

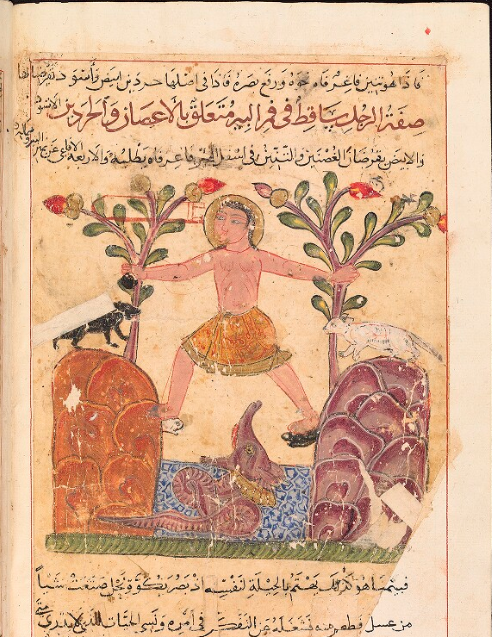
The jackals Kalila and Dimna look on as the snake and the elephant fight. Arabic, 1340

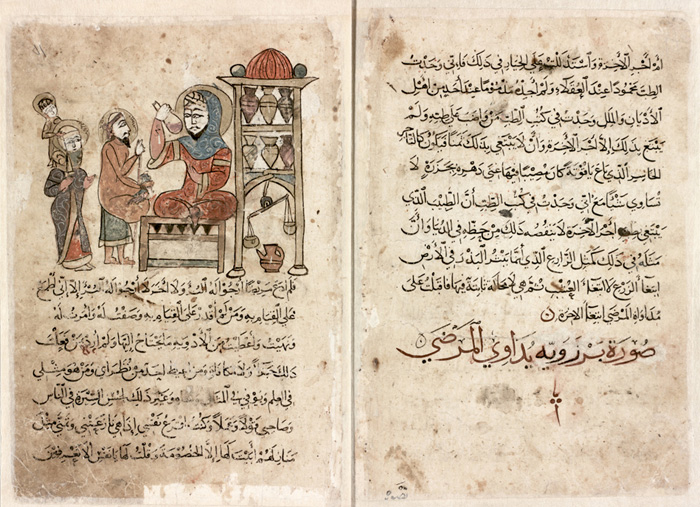
"Barzueh heals the sick". 1346–1347

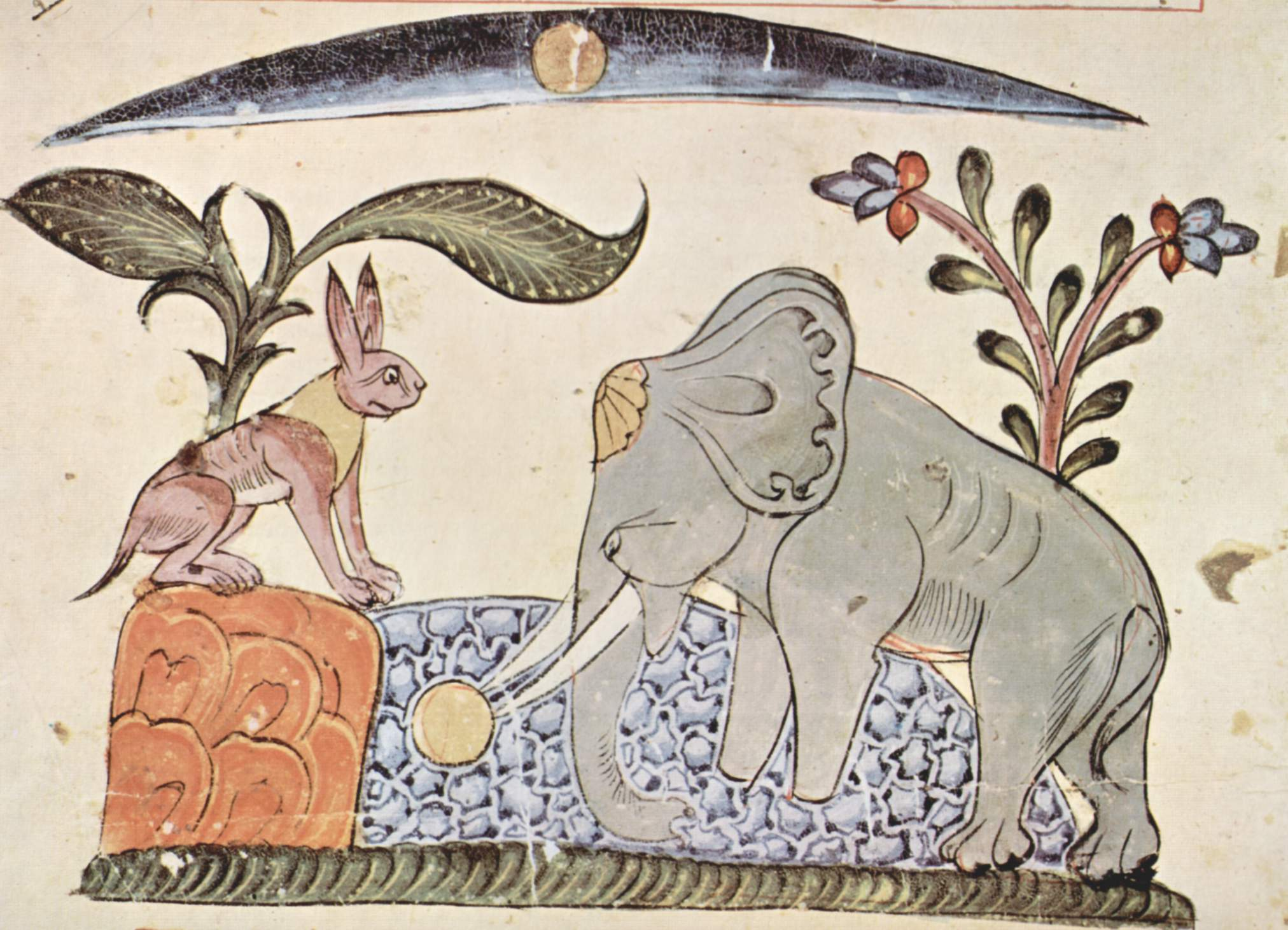
Hare fools Elephant by showing the moon's reflection. Arabic, 1354

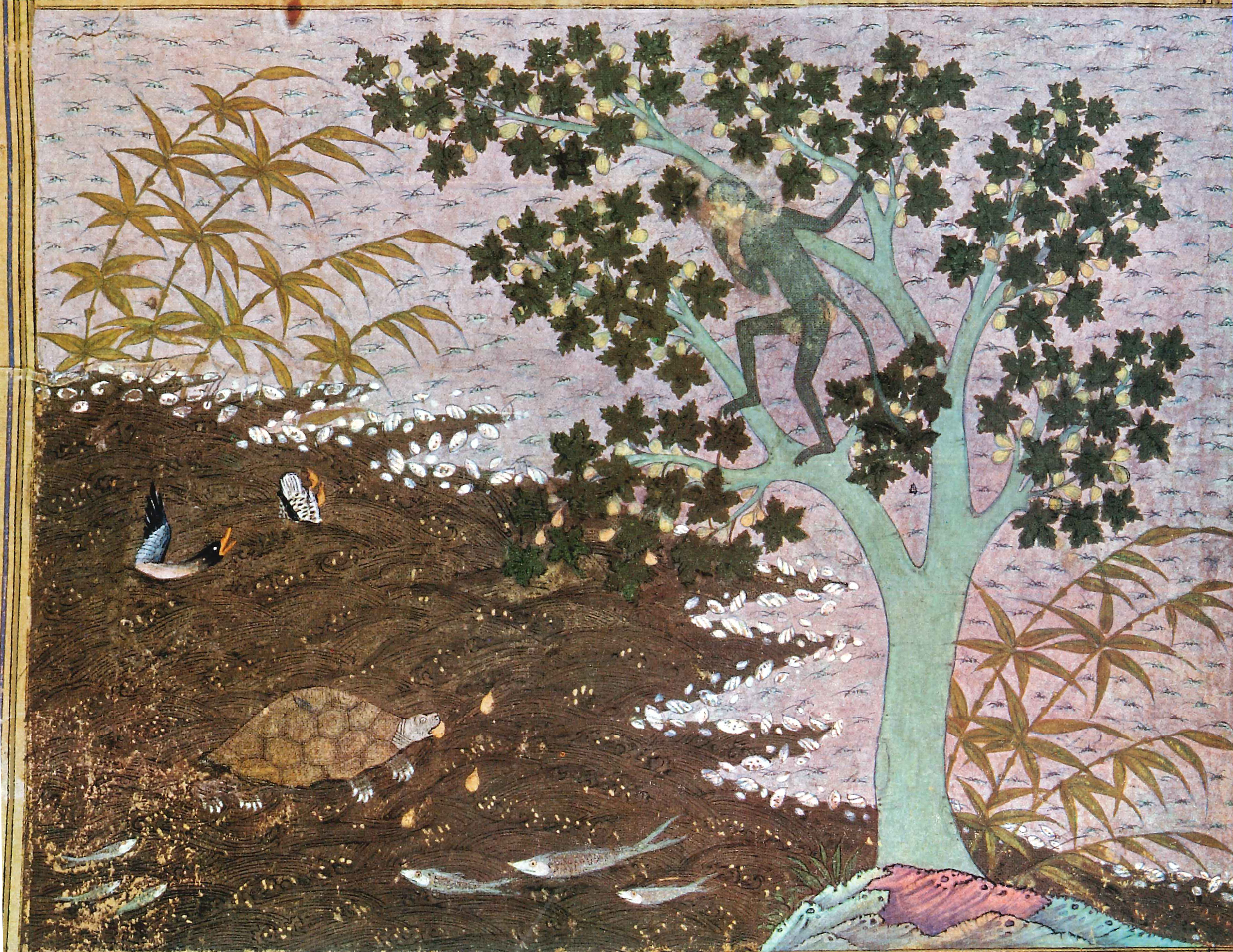
The turtle and the monkey. Persian, Timurid school, c. 1410–1420

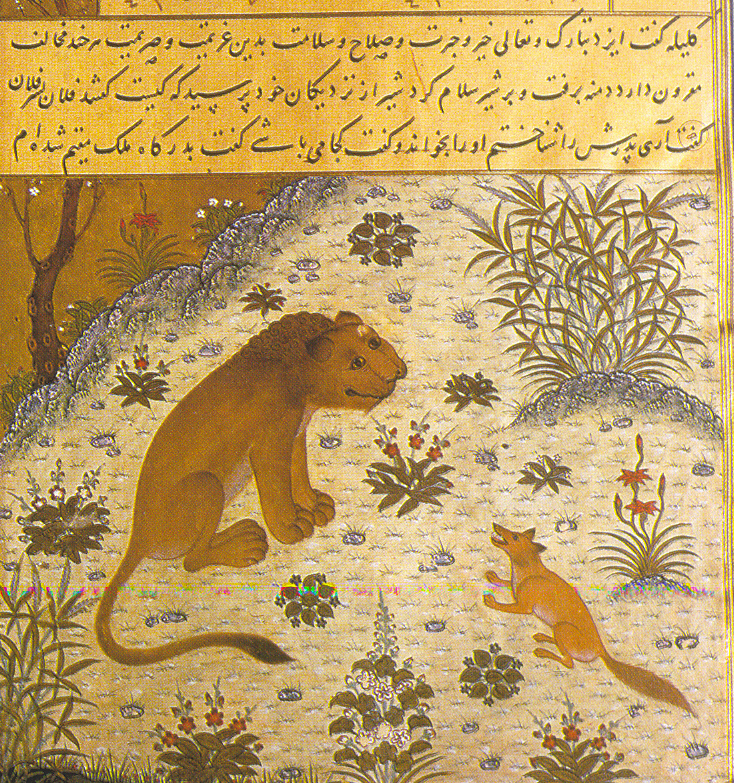
A page from a Persian manuscript, dated 1429

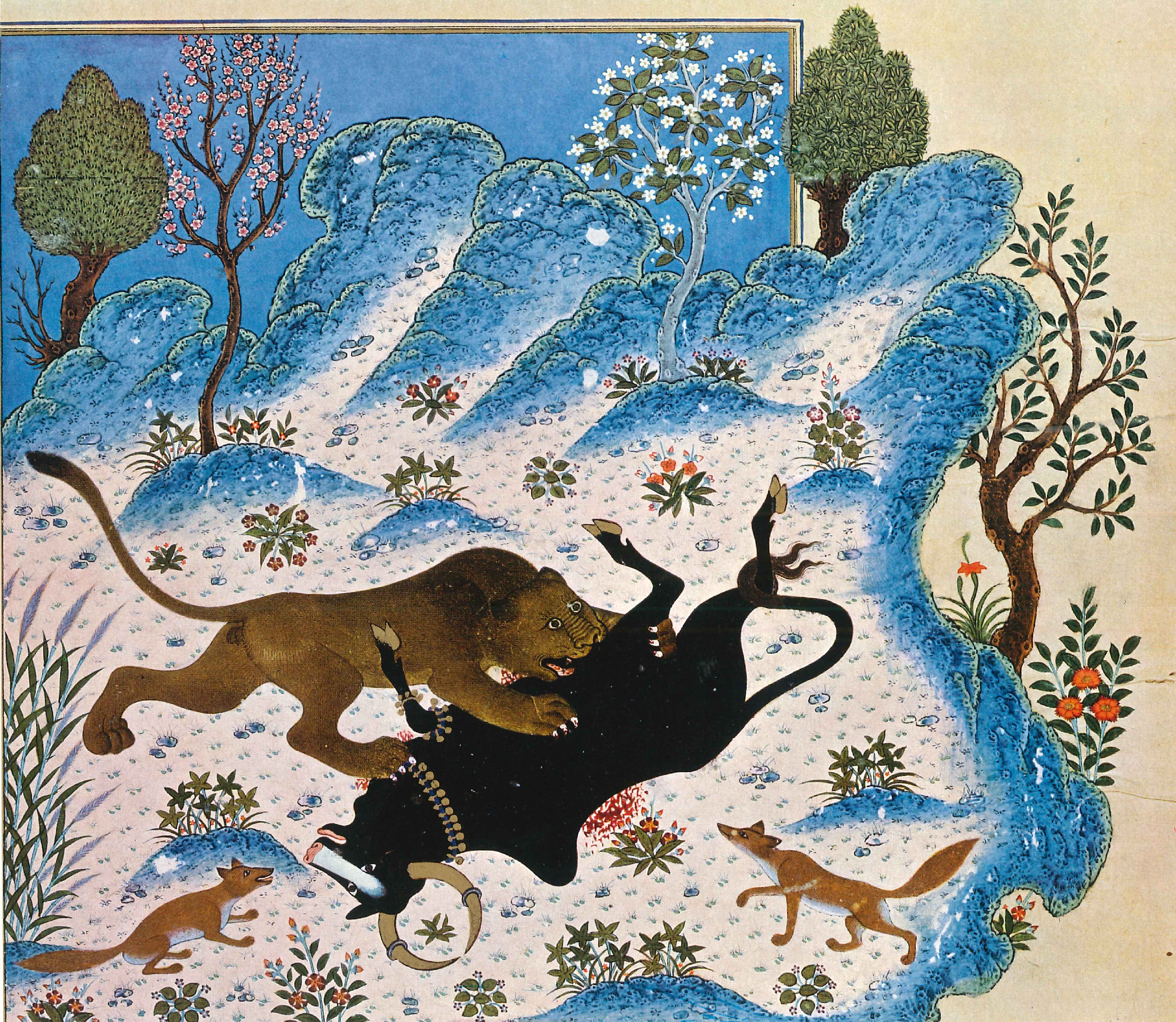
The lion eats the bull, as the two jackals look on. Painted in Herat, 1430

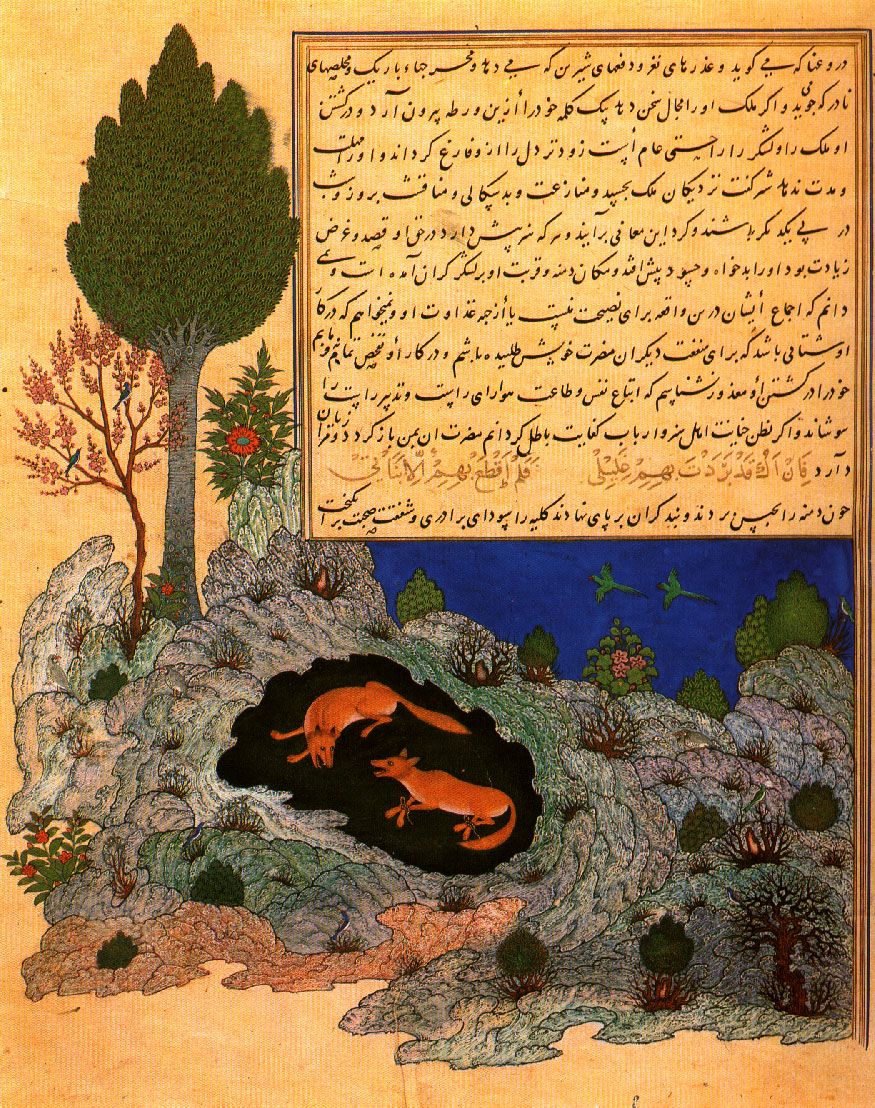
The jackals Kalila and Dimna in their den. Herat school, 1431

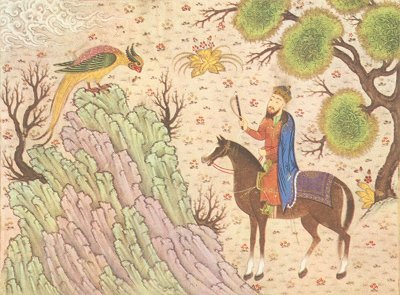
Fanzah refuses to return to the King. Probably made for Pir Budaq, Baghdad?, c. 1460

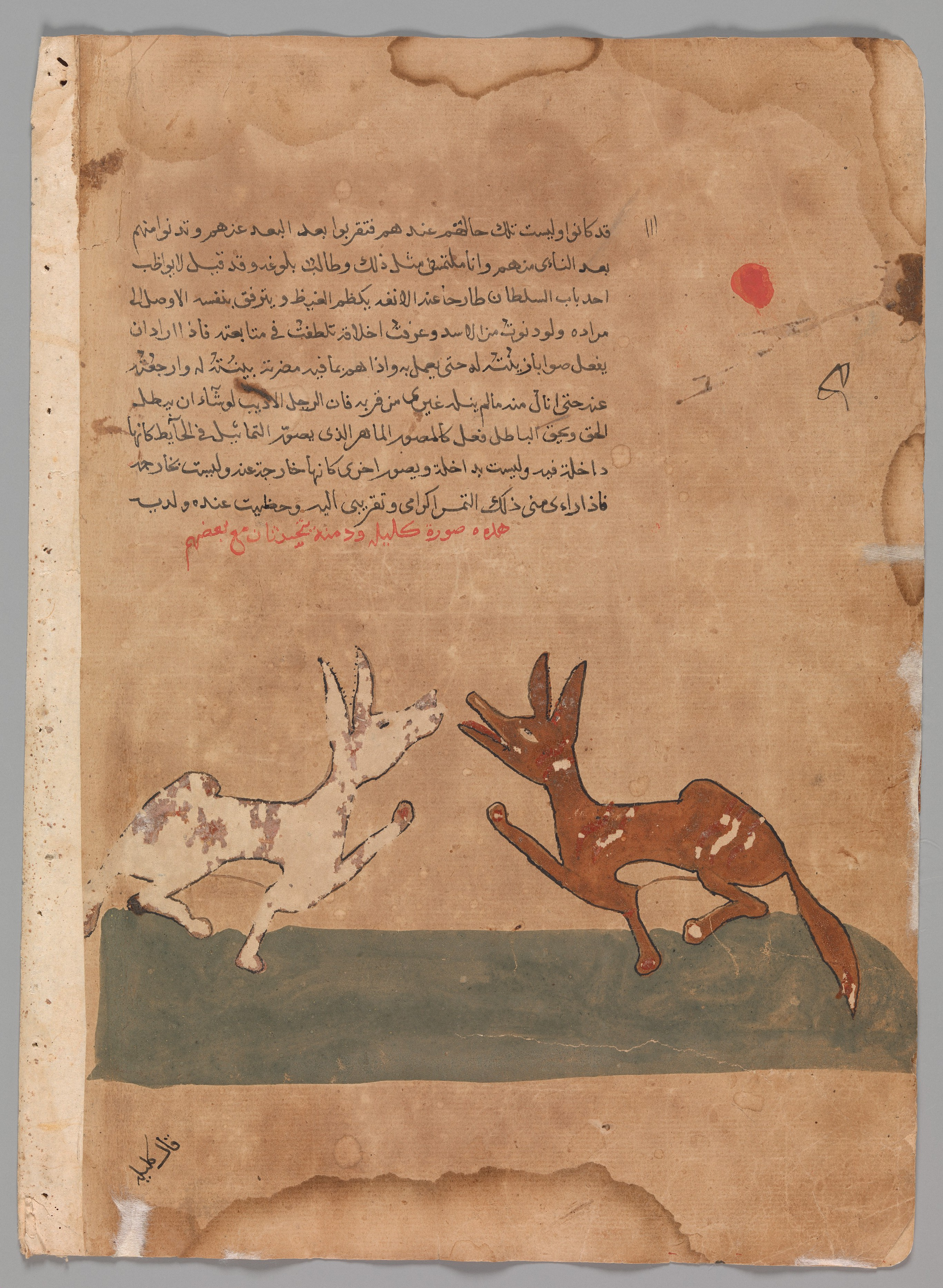
"Kalila and Dimna Discussing Dimna's Plans to Become a Confidante of the Lion". 18th century

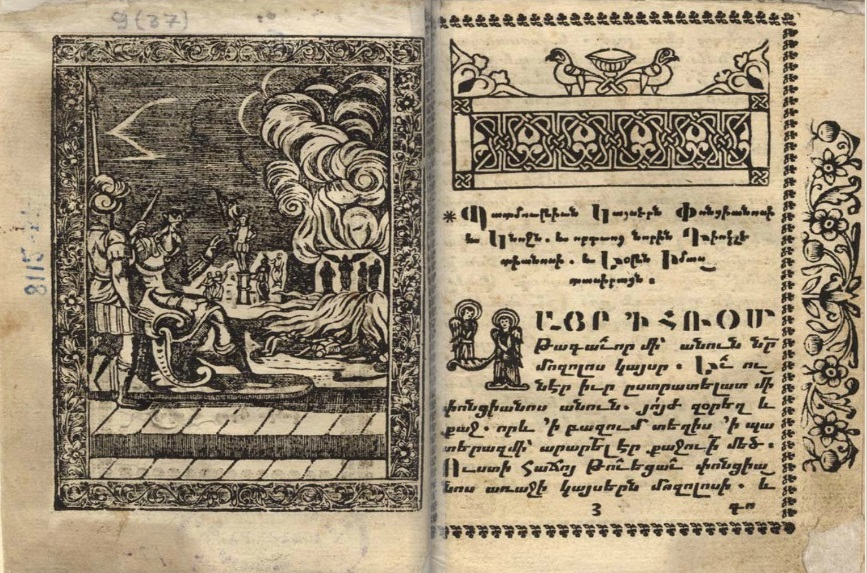
Armenian translation of The story of seven sages, 1740

== Legacy ==
Ibn al-Muqaffa's translation of the Middle Persian manuscript of Kalila and Dimna is considered a masterpiece of Arabic and world literature. In 1480, Johannes Gutenberg published Anton von Pforr's German version, Buch der Beispiele der alten Weisen. La Fontaine, in the preface to his second collection of Fables, explicitly acknowledged his debt to "the Indian sage Pilpay". The collection has been adapted in plays, cartoons, and commentary works. The adaptability of its animal allegory was such that illustrated versions could be interpreted as containing specific political messages, with one scholar arguing that the 14th-century Mongol-era paintings potentially served as an allegory for a vizier's position at court.

Beyond its well-documented literary influence, the Kalila wa-Dimna fables have served a crucial, parallel role in Arabic language pedagogy. For centuries, the text's rich vocabulary, complex sentence structures, and engaging narratives have made it a cornerstone for advanced students of Classical Arabic. Its status as a classic ensured its continuous study in scholarly circles. In the modern era, this tradition continues, with linguists and educators creating specific abridged and simplified versions of the fables. These dedicated classroom editions are designed to teach grammar and composition, proving the text's enduring utility. This sustained use across different eras highlights its unique dual legacy as both a masterpiece of world literature and an indispensable educational tool.

== See also ==
- Hitopadesha
- Jataka tales
- Aesop's Fables
- Panchatantra
- Mahabharata
- One Thousand and One Nights

== Sources ==
- Contadini, Anna (1 January 2012). A World of Beasts: A Thirteenth-Century Illustrated Arabic Book on Animals (the Kitāb Na't al-Ḥayawān) in the Ibn Bakhtīshū' Tradition. Brill. doi:10.1163/9789004222656_005.
- Atıl, Esin (1981). Kalila wa Dimna : fables from a fourteenth-century Arabic manuscript. Internet Archive. Washington, D.C. : Smithsonian Institution Press. ISBN 978-0-87474-216-9.
