= Kalila and Dimna (Istanbul University Library F.1422) =

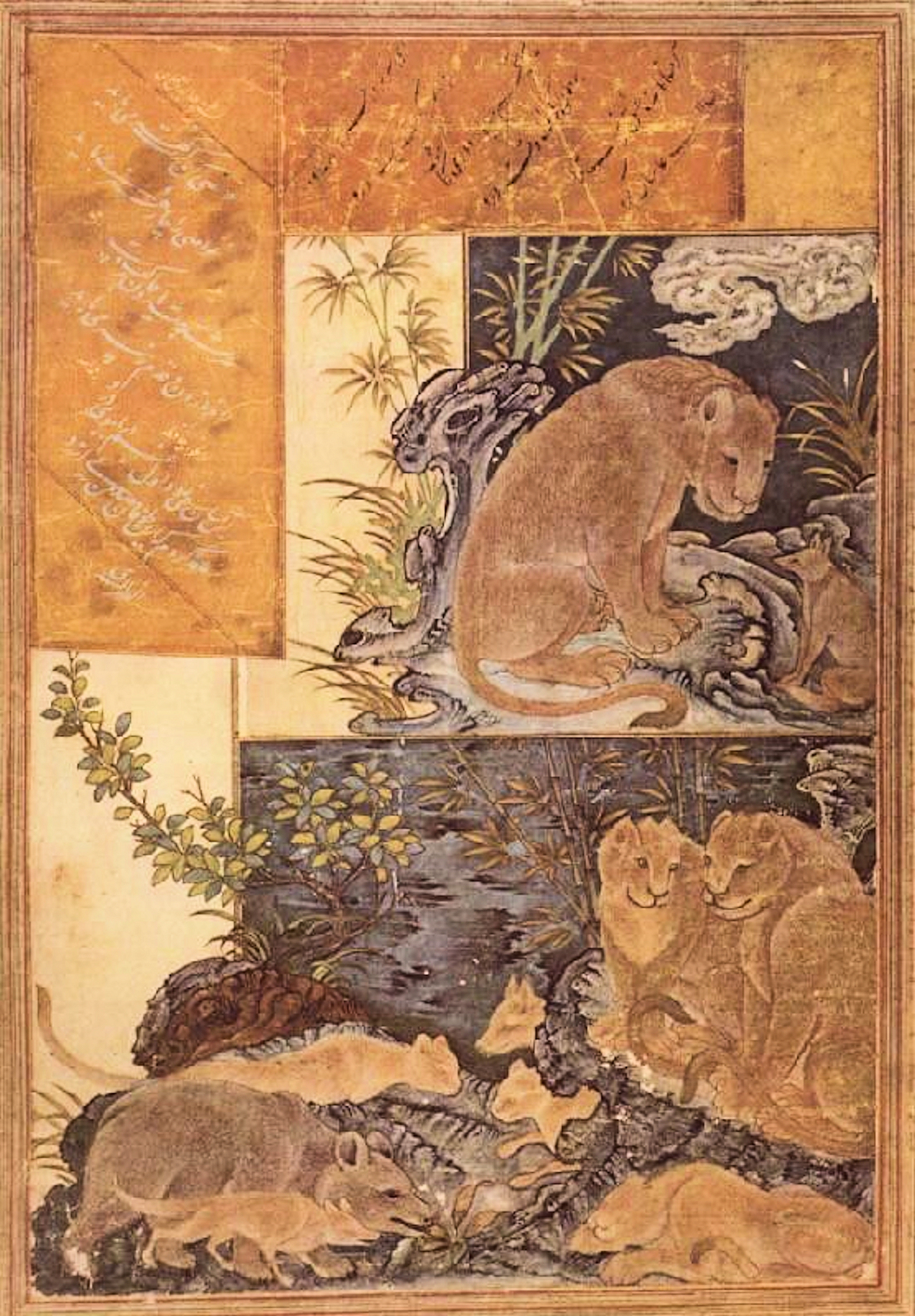
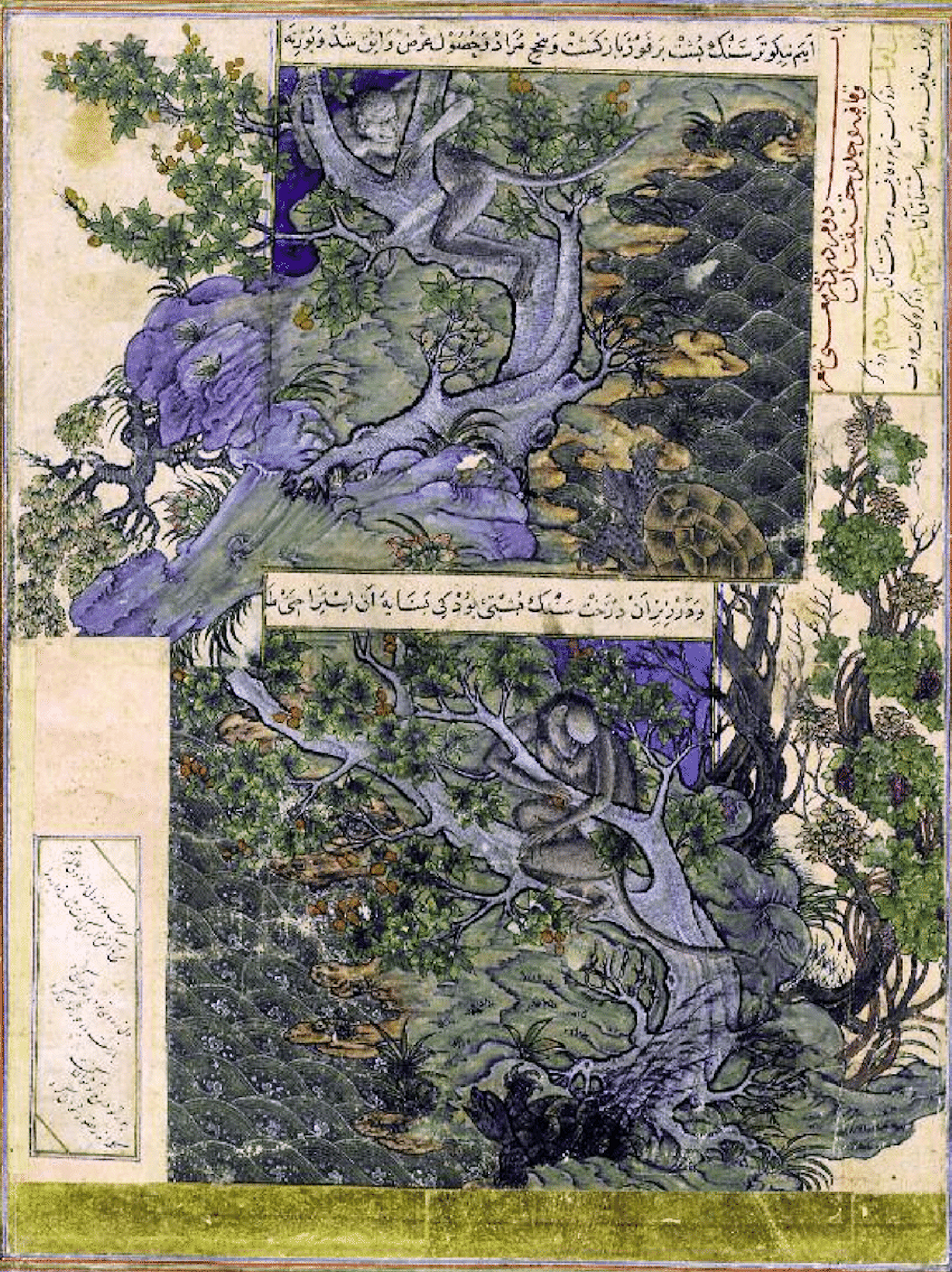
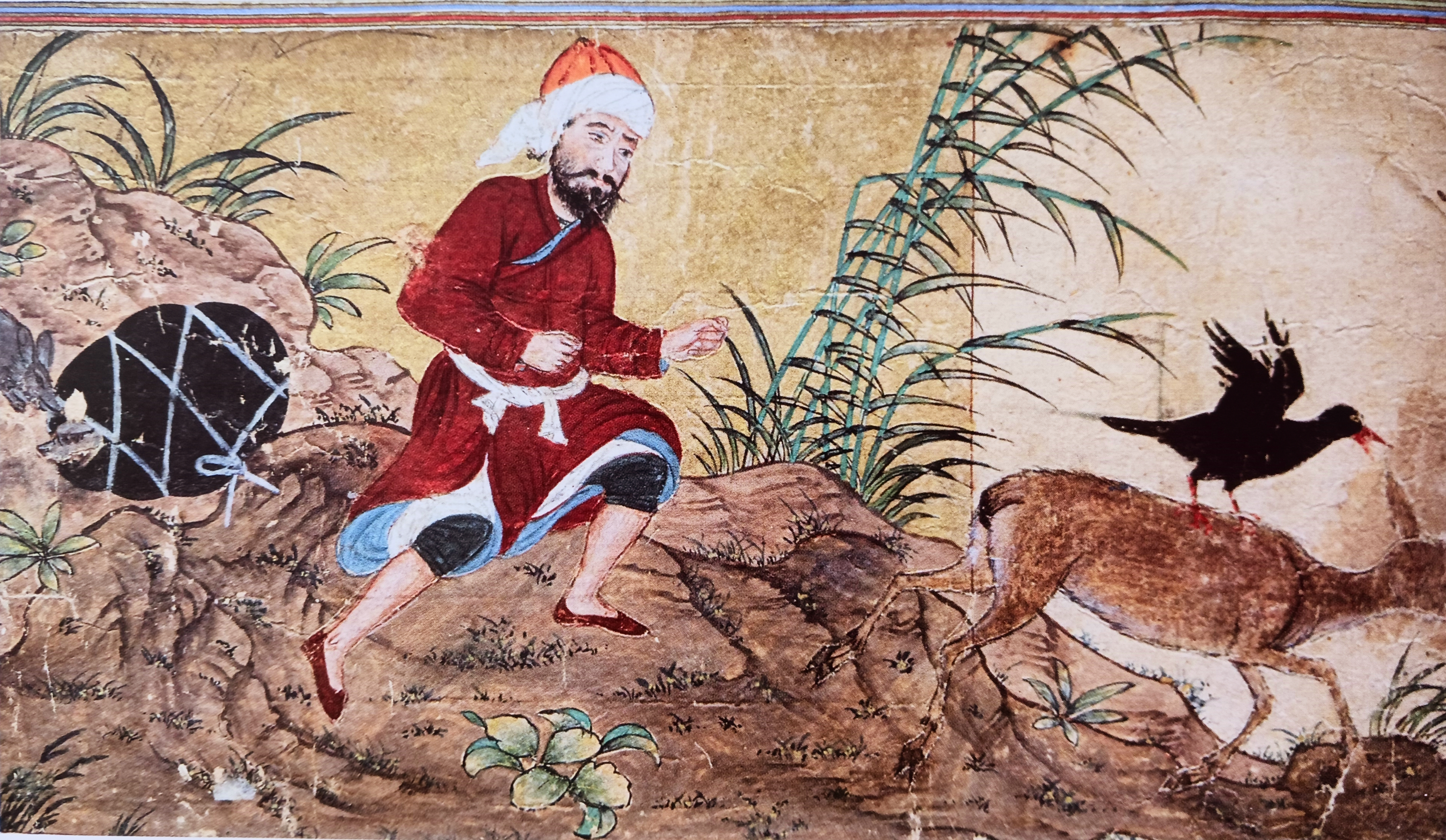
- Kalila and Dimna, The Monkey and the Tortoise and The hunter and the gazelle animal fables. Kalila and Dimna (1370-74), Tabriz. Tentatively attributed to Ahmad Musa.
- Author: Abu'l-Ma'ali Nasrallah
- Illustrator: Attributed to Ahmad Musa
- Language: Persian
- Subject: Romantic stories
- Publication date: 1370-74
- Publication place: Jalayirid Sultanate
- Media type: Manuscript

The Kalila and Dimna (Istanbul University Library F.1422) is a Jalayirid illustrated manuscript created in 1370-74. It belongs to the long series of the Kalila and Dimna illustrated fables (originally based on the Indian animal stories Panchatantra), starting as early as 1200-1220, with the Arab language Kalila and Dimna (BNF, Arabe 3465), the first known installment.

The Jalayirids led some of the most important changes in Persian art, at the junction between the creations of the Il-Khanate in the 13-14th century, and those of the Safavids in the 16th century. They contributed to the formation of Persian miniatures, especially through the introduction of Chinese-inspired natural landscapes. According to Ernst J. Grube, Jalayirid painting was the source of "modern" Persian-Islamic painting. The characteristics of the Jalayirid school of miniatures were lyrical scenes with elegant small figures in lavish interiors or lush natural surroundings, painted in pastel colors. The subject matters were generally poetic, rather than epic.

Shaykh Uvays (r. 1356–74), the son of Shaykh Hasan-i Buzurg, was a great sponsor of the arts, and was described as a refined and artistic ruler, himself capable in various arts. The majority of the paintings of the Great Jalayirid Shāhnāma are attributed to his reign. He is also credited with this remarkable Kalila and Dimna, dated to 1370-74.

This illustrated manuscript is considered as particularly innovative in its treatment of pictorial space, its visual complexity and dynamism. The remarkable depiction of landscape perspective and texture make it "one of the most important painted manuscripts of its time". It also served as a model to many later Persian manuscripts.

A later copy of this manuscript is Kalila and Dimna, 1520-1539, Herat (Rampur Raza Library, F.2982).

== Sources ==
- Wing, Patrick (2016). The Jalayirids: Dynastic State Formation in the Mongol Middle East. Edinburgh University Press. ISBN 978-1474402255.
