= Tandu =

Tandu may also refer to:

- Tandu, Linxiang (坦渡镇), a town in Linxiang city, China
- DJ Tandu (born 1966), German trance producer and DJ
- Tandu Khatun, ruler of the Jalairid Sultanate in Iraq
- Tandu, fictional extraterrestrial species from David Brin's Uplift Universe
