= Uways =

Uways (Arabic: أويس) and variants may refer to:

== People ==
- Uways al-Qarani (594–657 CE), a Yemenite from the time of Prophet Muhammad, classified by Muslims as a Ṭābi‘ī
- Shaykh Uways Jalayir, Jalayirid ruler (1356–1374)
- Uvais II, Jalayirid ruler (1415–1421)
- Uwais Khan, Moghul Khan of Mughalistan 1418–1421 CE and 1425–1429 CE
- Esen Buqa II (died 1462), Khan of Moghulistan
- Üveys Pasha (1512–1547), Ottoman pasha
- Uways al-Barawi (1847–1909), Somali Islamic scholar
- Mohammed Uwais (born 1936), Chief Justice of the Supreme Court of Nigeria

== Religious movements ==
- Uwaysi, a Sufi silsila named for Uways al-Qarani
