= Jalayirid Sultanate =

1335–1432 Mongol state in modern Iraq and western Iran

Jalayirid Sultanate جلایریان
- 1335–1432
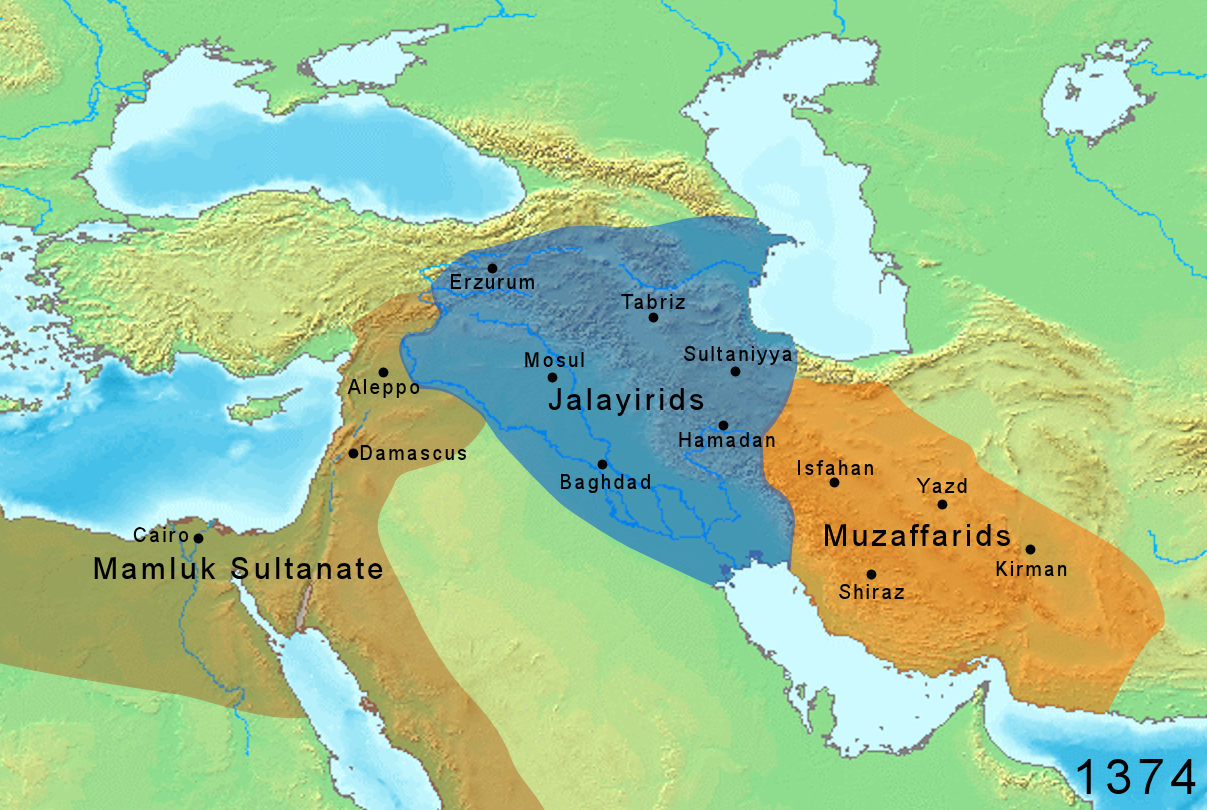
- The Jalayirid state at its greatest territorial extent in 1374, before the Timurid invasions
- Capital: Baghdad (1335–1358 and 1388–1411); Tabriz (1358–1388); Hillah (1409– 1410); Basra (1411–1432)
- Common languages: Persian (government, poetry); Mongolian (government); Arabic (religious); Turkic
- Religion: Islam
- Government: Monarchy
Preceded by	Succeeded by
Ilkhanate	Timurid Empire; Qara Qoyunlu
- Today part of: Iran; Iraq; Syria

The Jalayirid Sultanate (Persian: جلایریان, romanized: Jalāyiriyān), also Ilka dynasty or Ilkanids, was a Mongol dynasty which ruled over modern-day Iraq and western Iran after the breakup of the Ilkhanate in the 1330s. It expanded for about fifty years, until disrupted by Timur's conquests and the revolts of the Qara Qoyunlu Turkoman. After Timur's death in 1405, there was a brief attempt to re-establish the sultanate in southern Iraq and Khuzistan. The Jalayirids were finally eliminated by the Qara Qoyunlu in 1432.

The Jalayirids originated from the Jalayir tribe, which was a prominent Mongolian tribe hailing from the area of the River Onon in eastern Mongolia, but in the 14th century in West Asia they became "largely Turkicized or at least Turkish-speaking". They are credited with bolstering Turkic influence in Arabic-speaking Iraq so much so that Turkic became the second-most-spoken language after Arabic. Still, the Jalayirid bureaucracy used Mongolian, Arabic and Persian in its documents. The Jalayirids were great contributors to Persianate culture: their role as artistic patrons marks an important period in the evolution of Persian art, where it developed major aspects that would serve as the basis of later Persian paintings.

== History ==
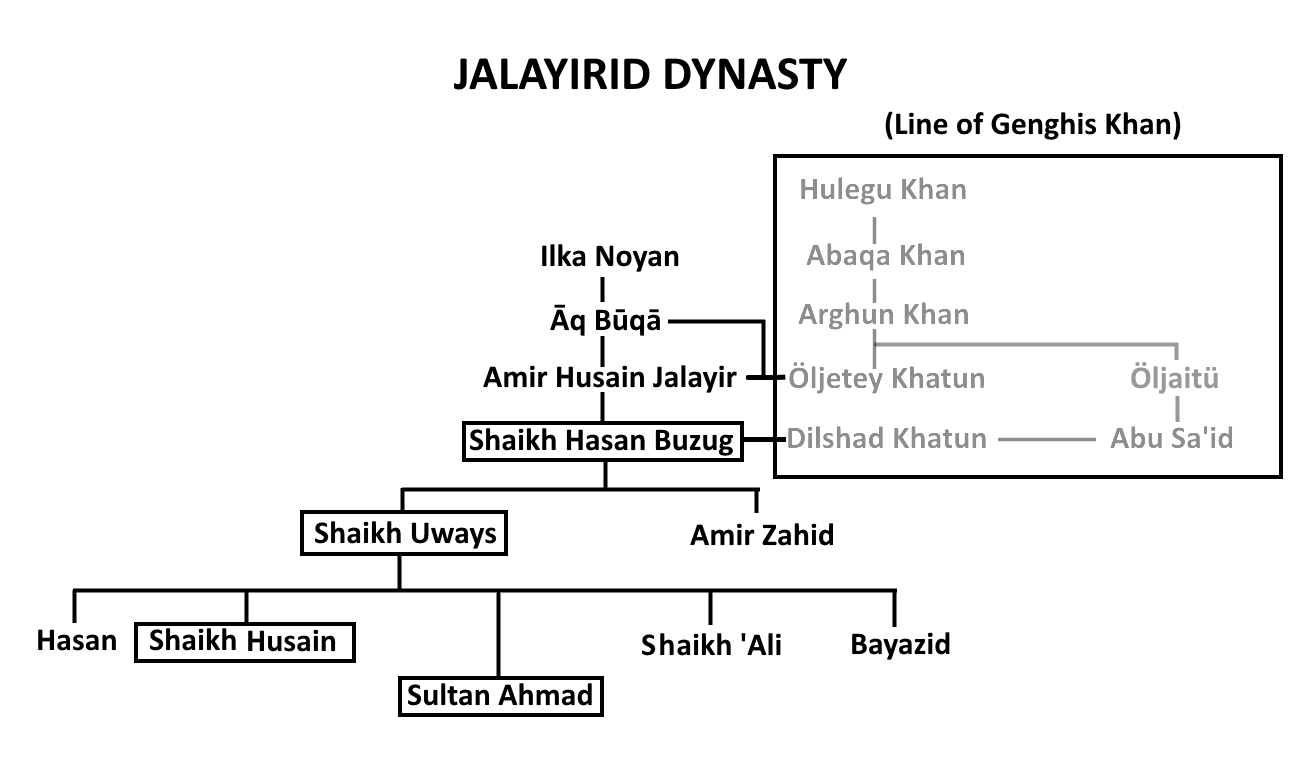
Jalayirid dynasty, and contribution from the line of Genghis Khan.

The dynasty was also called the "Ilka dynasty" or "Ilkanids" after Hasan Buzurg's great-grandfather Ilka Noyan.

The history of the Sultanate of Jalayirid can be divided into four phases:

- The first phase was during the early years when the dynasty was practically autonomous but theoretically accepted the authorization of the Ilkhanate state.
- The second phase, corresponding to the rule of Shaykh Uways Jalayir (1356–1374), is the peak of the Jalayirids.
- The third phase was a weakening period that began after the death of Uways.
- The fourth phase was when the country became exposed to external attacks by Timur and the Qara Qoyunlu and where the dynasty came to an end.

=== Early years ===
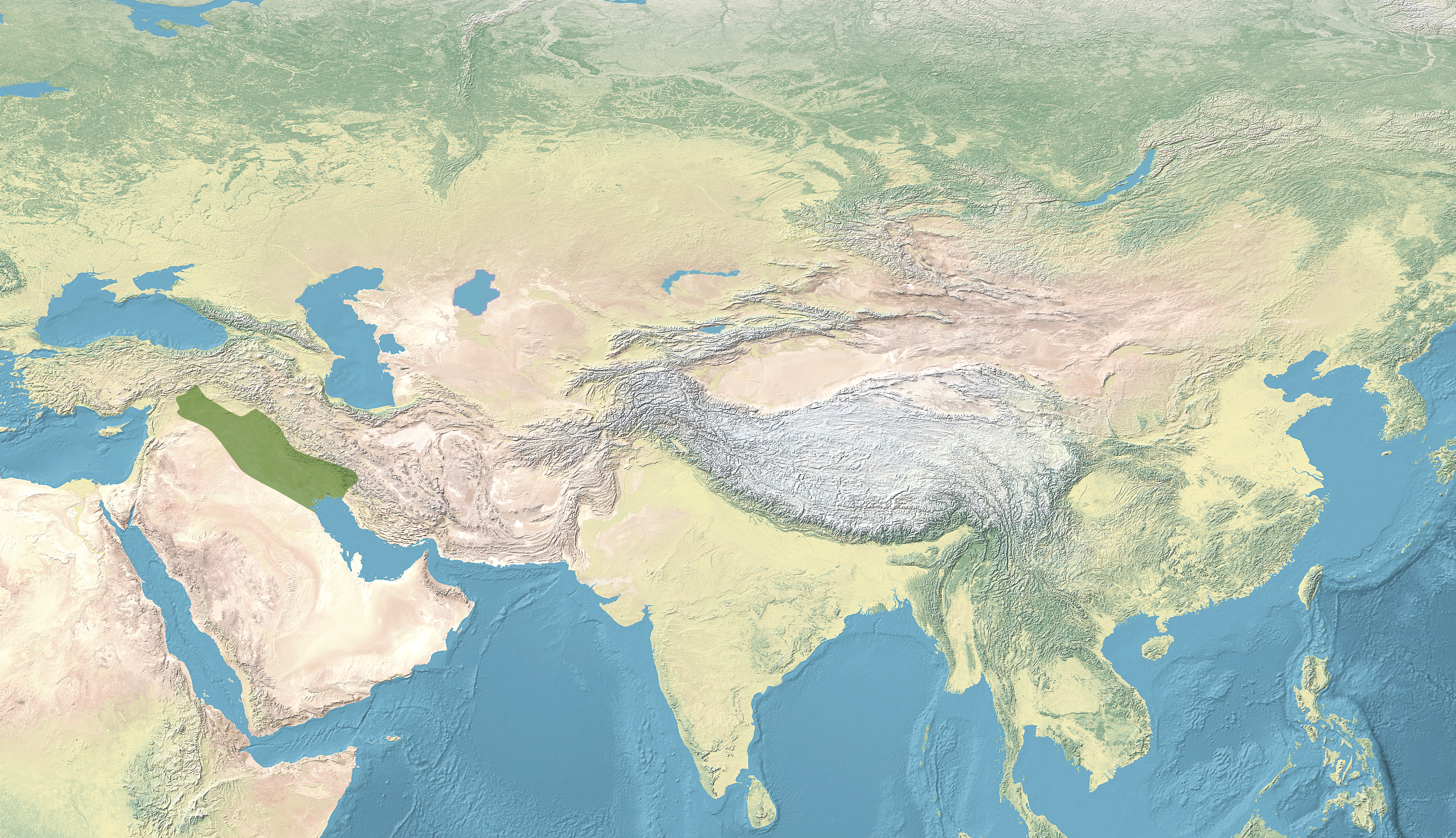
Original location of the Jalairs in Mongolia, and territory of the Jalayirids circa c. 1400 ( ).

During the disintegration years of the Ilkhanate after the death of Abu Sa'id Bahadur Khan in 1335, the family of emir Ilge (Īlgā) Noyan, known as Köke (Kukā, 'Blue') Ilge, descendants of the Jalayirid tribe, first emerged as the inheritors of the traditional governors of the southwestern lands of the Ilkhanate. The Jalairs hailed from pasturelands along the River Onon in Mongolia and produced several military commanders during the Mongol era. According to the Jami' al-tawarikh written by Rashid-al-Din Hamadani, Ilge, who accompanied Hulegu on his great expedition to West Asia in the 1250s, was among the generals who besieged the Assassins' strongholds in Qohestan in 1256. Besides, Ilge joined the expedition to Baghdad and was tasked with overseeing the rebuilding of the city after its siege in 1258. Ilge Noyan served Hülegü until the khan's death in 1265. When the Abaka khan came to the throne in 1265 and was identified as a senior emir, Ilge was in charge of the ordos ("royal headquarters"). Ilge was one of the main military leaders in conflicts with the Mamluks and Jochids, neighbors and opponents of the Ilkhanate, in Baghdad, Syria, Diyarbakir and the Caucasus.

Ilka Noyan's sons Aq Buqa (Āqbuqā), Tughu were also in the service of Abaga khan. Aq Buqa, who was promoted to mir-e mirān (commander-in-chief) by Gaykhatu, was later assassinated by Baydu's supporters in 1295. He became the patron (murabbī) of Sadr al-Din Zanjani, Kaykhatu's grand vizier. Aq Buqa was married to Ghazan Khan's sister Ūljatāy Sulṭān, but after his death, his son Husain married his father's wife and took the title of gūrgān (greregen) or royal son-in-law.

Husain first served Oljaitu and then Abu Sa'id, and took part in the march on Gilan in 1317. He was later appointed ruler of Arran in 1313 and died in Khorasan in 1322.

=== Hasan Buzurg (1335–1356) ===
After the death of Husain, his son Shaykh Hasan ("Hasan Buzurg", "Hasan The Great") became the head of the family. He was both the cousin of Abu Sa'id and the nephew of Amir Choban.

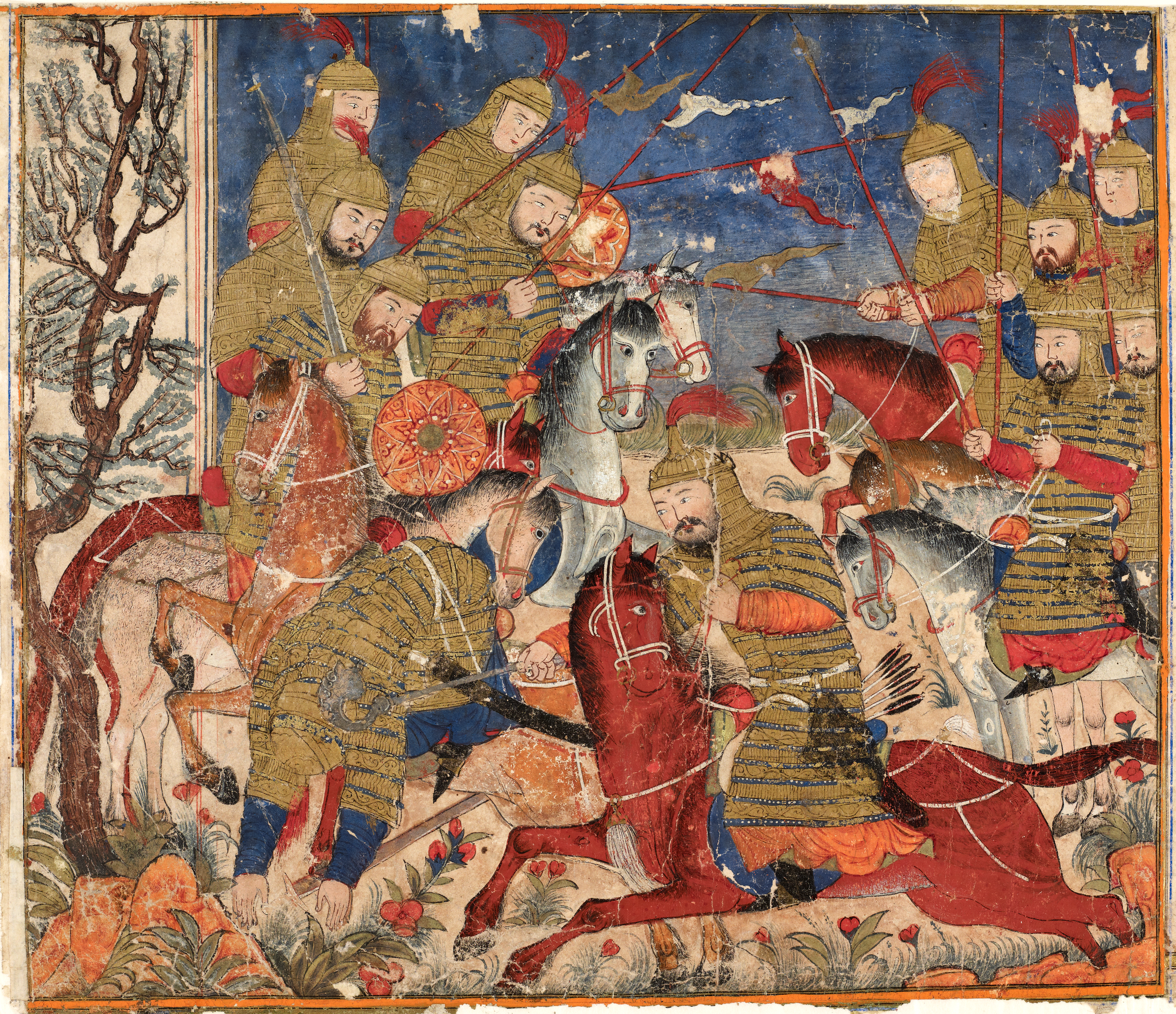
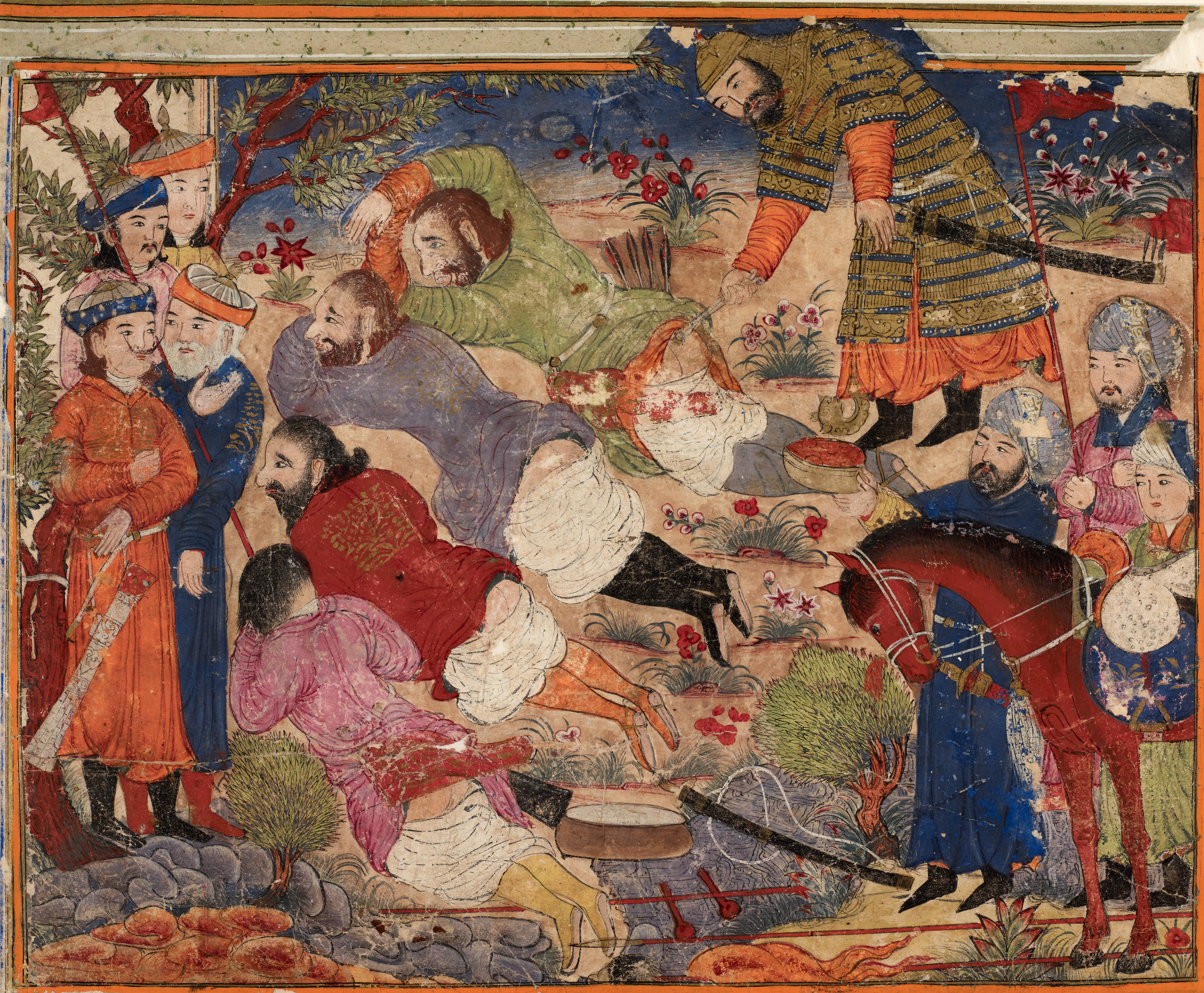
Jalayirid equestrian combat scene, and branding or whipping of prisoners. Great Jalayirid Shāhnāma, Diez Albums, c. 1335–1355. SBB-PK, Diez A.

After defeating his rivals, Hasan Buzurg strengthened his ties with Muhammad Khan ("Pir Hussein"), who ruled Anatolia at the time. This reflected Hasan Buzurg's attempts to reestablish Chinggisid legitimacy, as Muḥammad Khan was a descendant of Hülegü through his son, Möngke Temür. Hasan Buzurg then proceeded to Tabriz where he put Muhammad on the throne and married the granddaughter of Chupan and the wife of Abu Sa'id, Dilshad Khatun. Shaykh Ḥasan was the ‘biklārī bik [beglerbeg], or amīr al-umarā’’.

For a short time in 1337–1338, Hasan Buzurg's authority was recognized in all parts of the Ilkhanate Empire except Khorasan, but after being expelled by Ḥasan-e Kucak and his brother Malek Ašraf in 1338–1339, he was forced to evacuate Azerbaijan and his power only held in Iraq. Shaikh Hasan became the lord of the powerful Mongol tribe of the Oirats in the 1340s, in their territories in Diyarbakr and northern Iraq.

Hasan Buzurg died in July 1356 and was buried in Najaf. He was succeeded by his son, Shaikh Uways Jalayir.

==== The Great Jalayirid Shāhnāmeh ====
The first Jalayirid ruler, Shaykh Hasan-i Buzurg (r. 1340–1356) ruled initially from Baghdad, but then obtained the control of Tabriz right after the death of Abu Sa'id, where he was able to set up a puppet Ilkhanid khan in the person of Muhammad Khan. After losing out to the Chobanids, Shaykh Hasan-i Buzurg returned to Baghdad, probably with some of the most important manuscripts of the Ilkhanid atelier. Post-Ilkhanid manuscripts are notably difficult to date, but one of their technical characteristic is the use of the margin with accompanying text, unknown in any pre-Jalayirid manuscript. One of these works is the Great Jalayirid Shahnameh (Istanbul, TSMK, H. 2153), parts of which were likely created in the 1340s-1350s during the rule of Hasan Buzurg (especially one scene of combat on horse, and one scene showing the capture of prisoners), while other parts date to Shaykh Uvays (1356–74).

=== Shaykh Uways period (1356–1374) ===
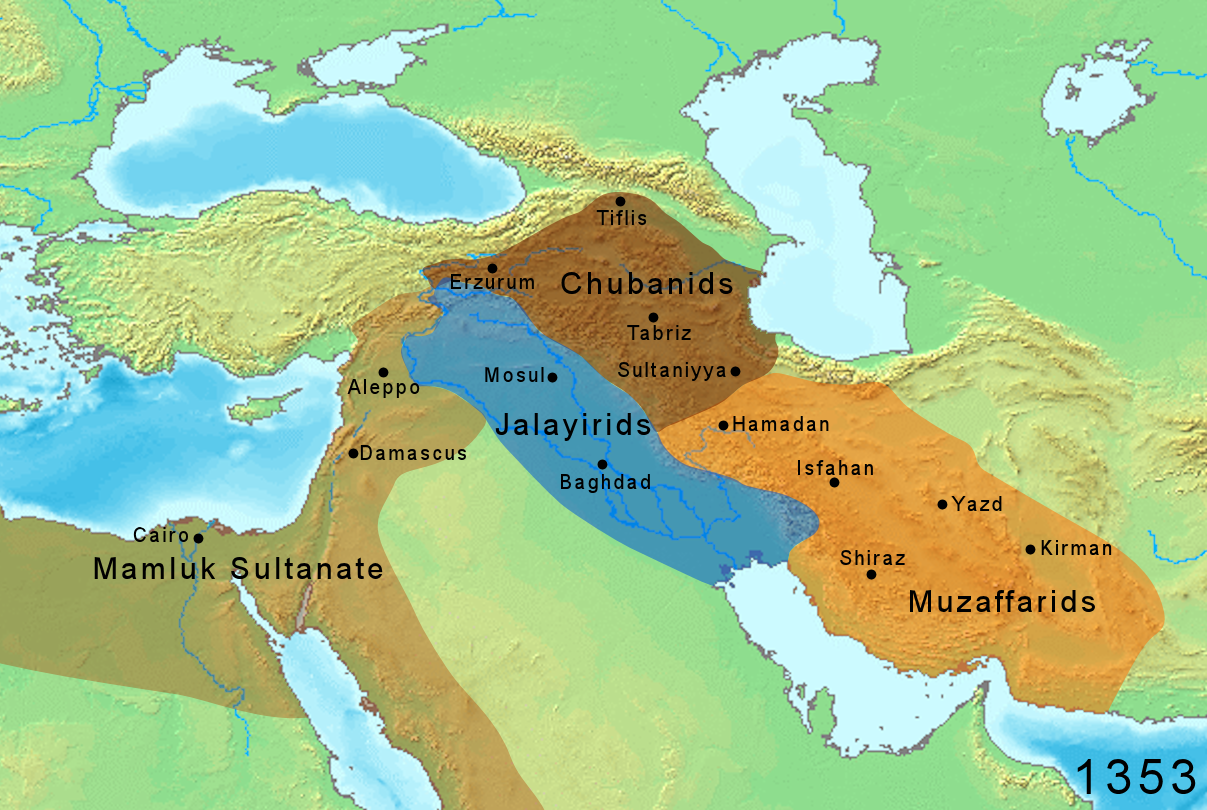
Territory of the Jalayirids , Chobanids and Muzaffarid in 1353

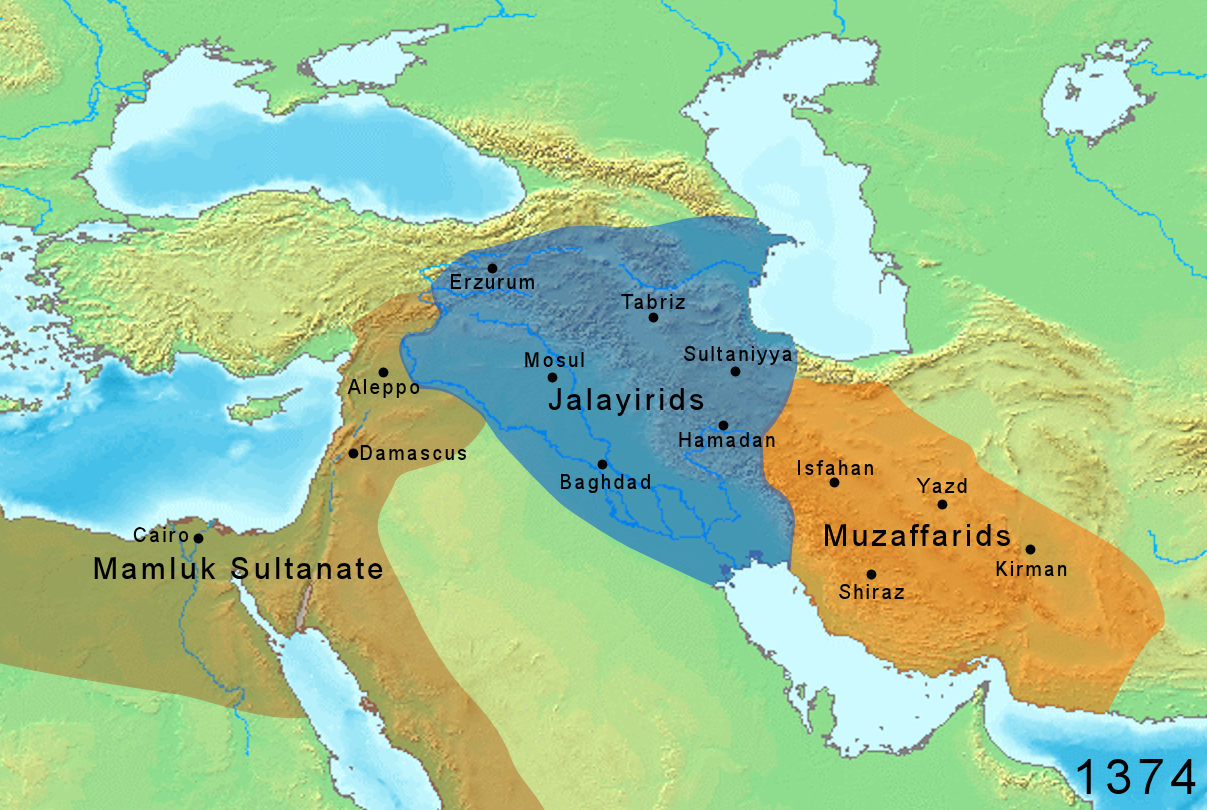
Extent of Jalayirid and Muzaffarid territories in 1374

According to historian Patrick Wing, while the Jalayirid sultans sought to preserve the social and political order of the Ilkhanate, they claimed to be the legitimate heirs of the rule of this order. At the center of Jalayirid claims to Ilkhanid heritage was their attempt to control Azerbaijan, the main center of the Ilkhanate. This province represented the symbolic heritage and material wealth of the Ilkhanate and became the focus of the Jalayirid political program.

The Jaliyirids were inheritors of the political and constitutional framework established by Chinggis Khan and his descendants, and Shaykh Uways considered himself as "resurector of the traditions of the Changizkhanid state, unfurler of the banners of the Sacred Law of the Prophet, kindler of the flame of the Muhammadan faith, distinguished by the support of God, Lord of the worlds".

Shortly after Shaykh Uways Jalayir succeeded his father, the Chobanids (old rivals of the Jalayrids) were overrun by the forces of the Golden Horde under Jani Beg in 1356-57. Jani Beg occupied the Georgian capital of Tiflis in 1356, and issued his own coinage there, followed by the coinage of his son Berdi Beg Juchid. Then the Chobanid ruler Malek Asraf was executed and Azerbaijan was conquered by the Jalayrids.

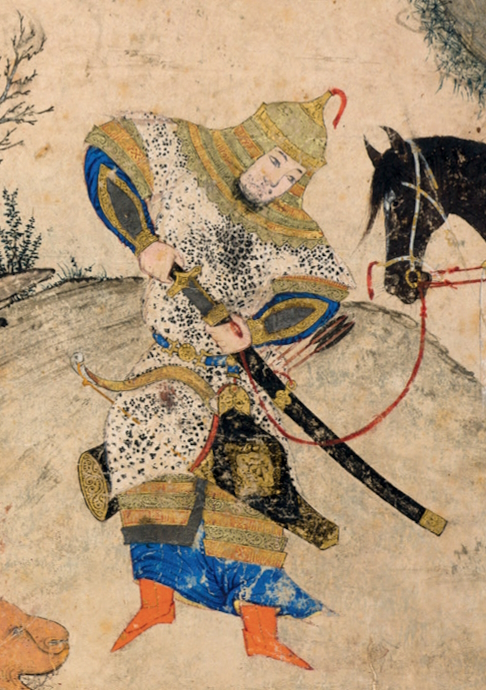
Isfandiyar’s Haft Khvān (Seven Labors), Great Jalayirid Shāhnāma, attr. Ahmad Musa by an inscription, Tabriz or Baghdad, ca. 1370–74. Folio, TSMK, H. 2153

Following Jani Beg's withdrawal from Azerbaijan, as well as his son Berdi Beg’s similar abandonment of the region in 1358, the area became a prime target for its neighbors. Shaykh Uways Jalayir, who at first had recognized the sovereignty of the Blue Horde, decided to take the former Chobanid lands for himself, even as a former amir of Malek Asraf’s named Akhichuq attempted to keep the region in Mongol hands. The Jalayirids occupied the Georgian capital Tiflis in 1357-1358, where they also minted their own coinage in the name of Shaykh Uways Jalayir.

The northern campaign ended prematurely, and in 1359 the Muzaffarid ruler Shah Shoja managed to occupy Azerbaijan and Arran for four months, briefly capturing Tabriz, the capital city of the Jalayirids. Shah Shoja was forced to turn back when internal conditions in Fars deteriorated: his second brother's son, Shah Yahya, had risen in revolt in Isfahan. Shah Shoja had to make peace with the Jalayirids, and offered to marry his son Zain al-Abidin to a sister of Shaikh Hussain Jalayir. The Jalayirids refused the offer and invaded the territory held by the Muzaffarids, although Shah Shoja managed to prevent them from getting any further than Soltaniyeh. Shaykh Uways Jalayir reconquered Azerbaijan with its capital of Tabriz in 1360. In addition to Baghdad, he could now boast Tabriz as a large city under his control.

In Tabriz, Shaykh Uvays built a palace complex known as the dawlat-khāna ("House of Fortune"), the main building of the Jalayirid period. It was the royal residence and the center of administration. Clavijo described the dawlat-khāna as a great palace with twenty thousand rooms.

Amongst these edifices there was a great house, which was surrounded by a wall, very beautiful and rich, in which there are twenty thousand chambers and apartments; and they say that this house was built by a ruler of Persia, named Sultan Veis; with the treasure that was paid him, as tribute, by the Sultan of Babylon. He called this house Tolbatgana which means "the house of fortune". This house is well built.

— Ruy González de Clavijo, Narrative of the embassy.

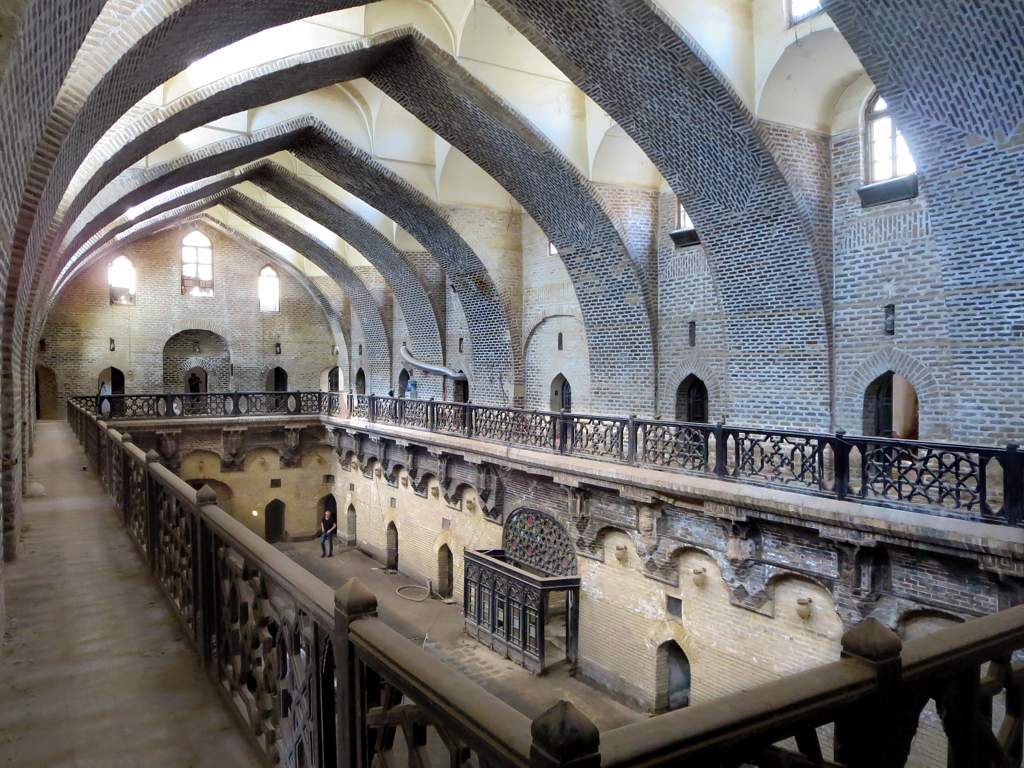
The Khan Mirjan complex, built by the Jalayirid Governor of Baghdad in 1356–58.

In Baghdad, the Jalayirid governor Marjan b. Abdallah built the Khan Mirjan complex (kulliya) between 1357 and 1359. It had many decoration and inscribed panels made by local artists, especially works by the calligrapher and illuminator Ahmad Shah, known as the "Golden Pen" (zarrin qalam) of Tabriz.

In 1364, Shaykh Uways Jalayir campaigned against the Shirvan Shah Kai-Ka’us, but a revolt begun by the governor of Baghdad, Khwaja Mirjan, forced him to return to reassert his authority. That same year, he occupied Shiraz, capital of the Muzaffarid Shah Shoja, in support of his rival brother Shah Mahmud, and struck coins in his own name in the southern city. In 1366, Shaykh Uways Jalayir marched against the Qara Qoyunlu, defeating their leader, Bairam Khwaja, at the battle of Mush. Later, he defeated the Shirvanshah, who had attacked Tabriz twice in the meantime. According to Zayn al- Dīn Qazvīnī and Ḥāfiẓ Abrū, Kā’ūs readily overpowered all of Shirvan and Darband for Shaykh Uways Jalayir, and remained a faithful servant as long as he lived. After the death of Kā’ūs, Shaykh Uways Jalayir confirmed his son, Hūshang, as the successor of Shirvanshahs.

Due to his campaigns, Shaykh Uways Jalayir spent much time in Iran, and he died in Tabriz in 1374. During his lifetime, the Jalayirid state reached its peak in power. In addition to his military adventures, which were considerable, he was known for his attempts to revive commercial enterprise, which had suffered heavily in the past years, in the region, as well as his patronage to the arts. His chronicler, Abu Bakr al-Qutbi al Ahri, wrote of Shaykh Uways Jalayir’ deeds in the Tarikh-i Shaikh Uvais. Shaykh Uways Jalayir was succeeded by his son Shaikh Hasan Jalayir. He appointed his son Hassan as his successor in Baghdad. After his death the power of the dynasty began to weaken sharply.

==== Art of the book ====
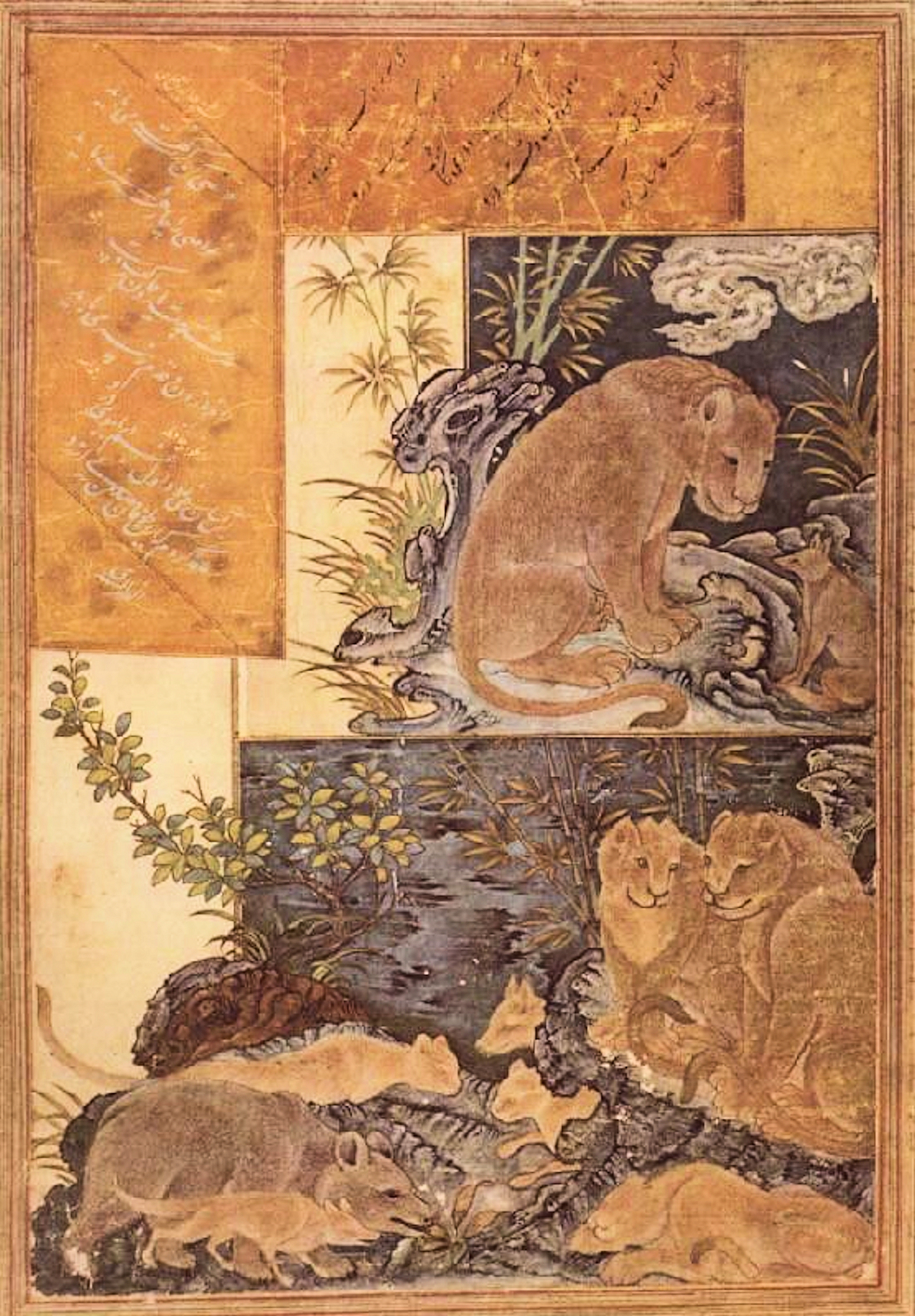
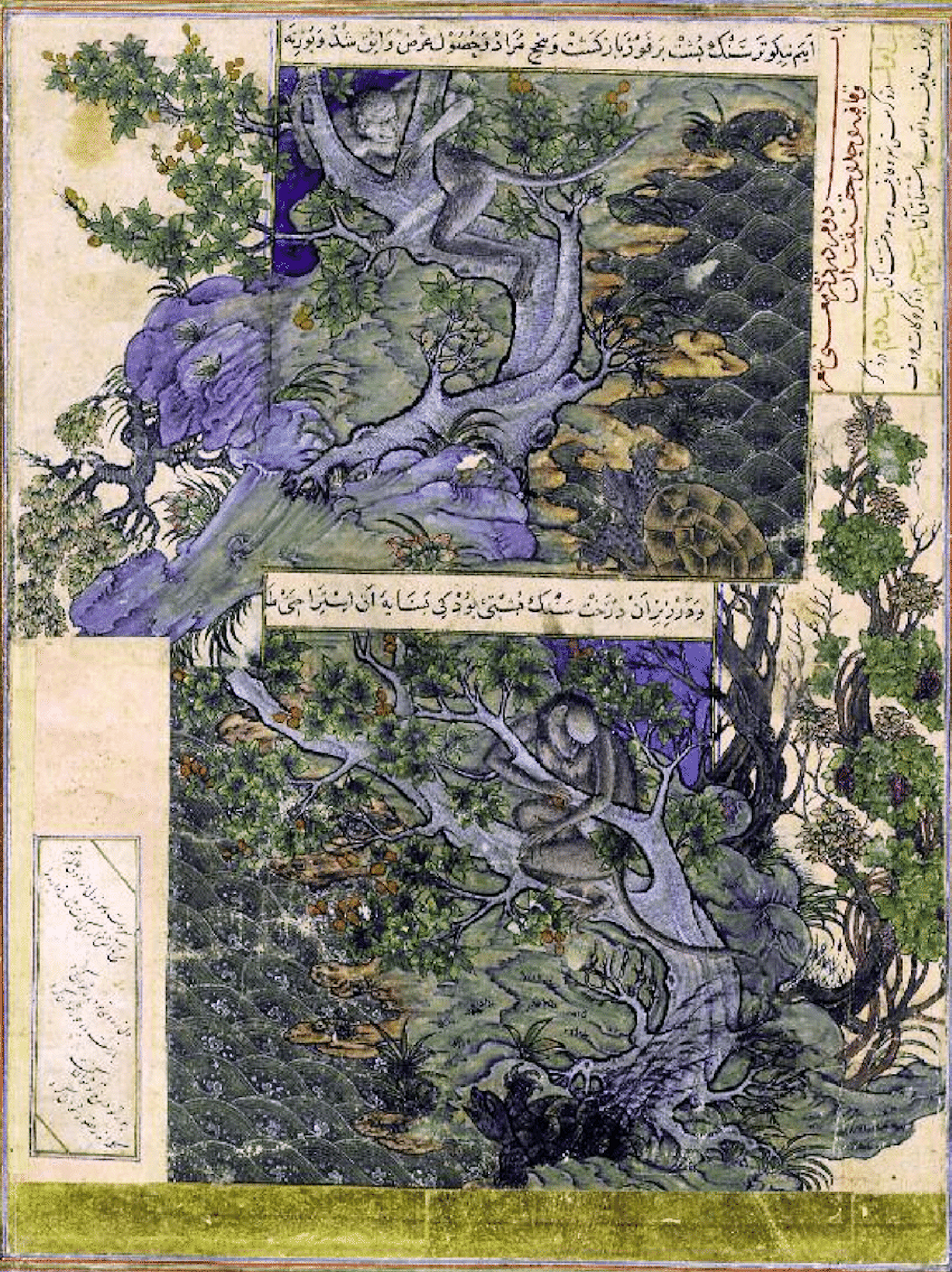
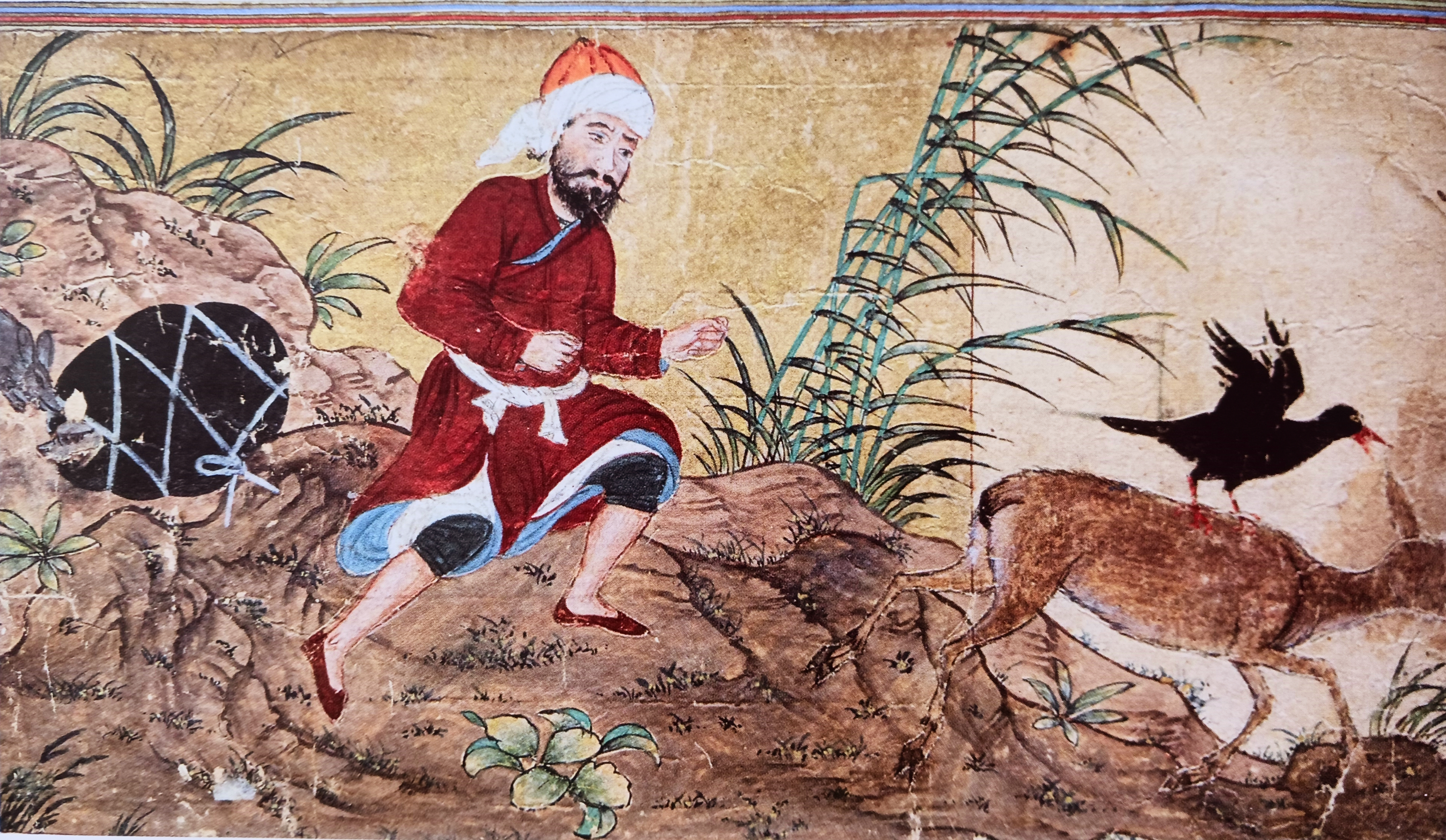
Kalila and Dimna, The Monkey and the Tortoise and The hunter and the gazelle animal fables. Kalila and Dimna (1370-74), Tabriz. Tentatively attributed to Ahmad Musa.

The Jalayirids led some of the most important changes in Persian art, at the junction between the creations of the Il-Khanate in the 13–14th century, and those of the Safavids in the 16th century. They contributed to the formation of Persian miniatures, especially through the introduction of Chinese-inspired natural landscapes. According to Ernst J. Grube, Jalayirid painting was the source of "modern" Persian-Islamic painting. The characteristics of the Jalayirid school of miniatures were lyrical scenes with elegant small figures in lavish interiors or lush natural surroundings, painted in pastel colors. The subject matters were generally poetic, rather than epic.

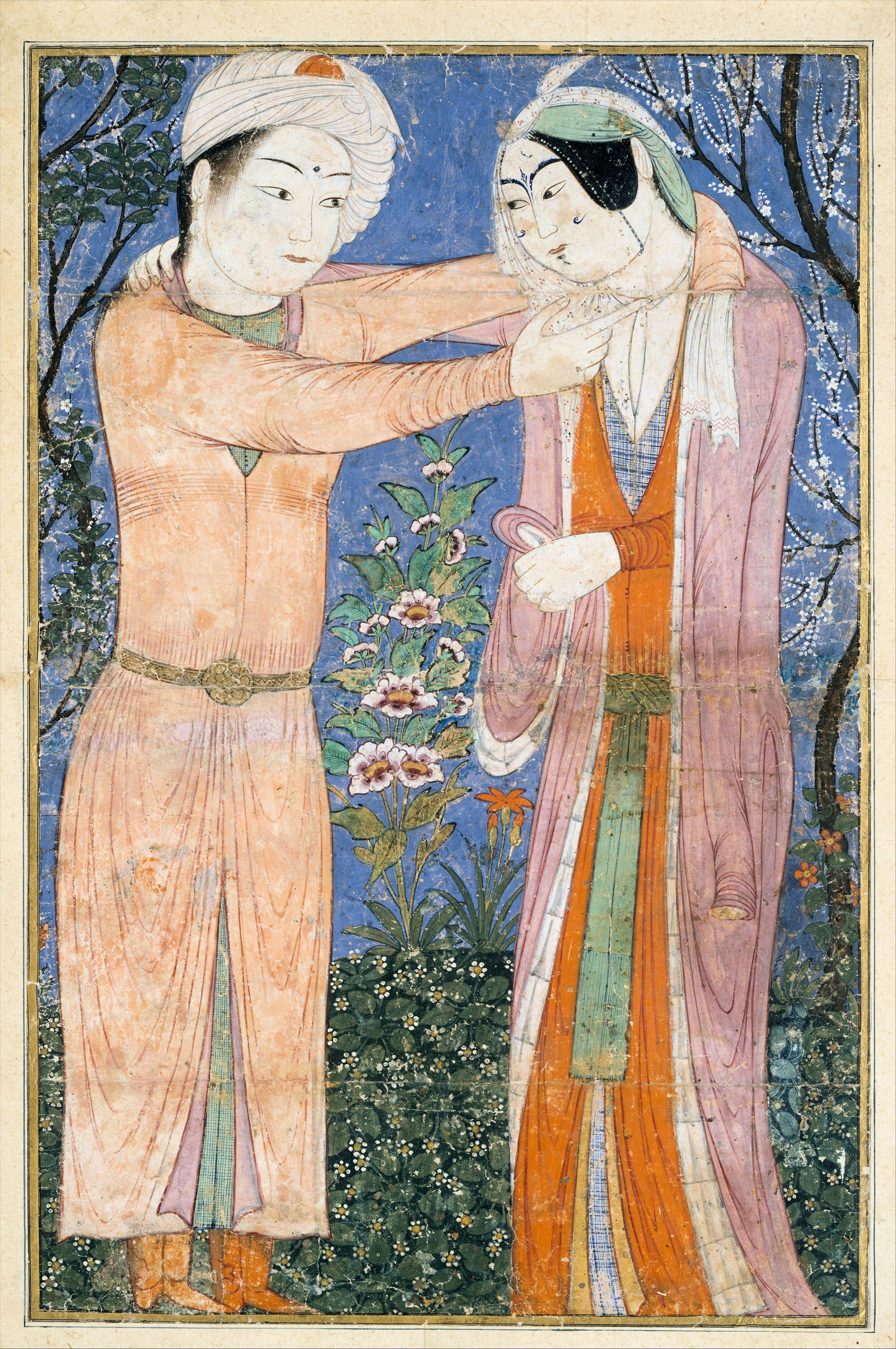
Jalayirid Princely couple, Baghdad 1400–1405. Housed in the Metropolitan Museum of Art

Shaykh Uvays (r. 1356–74), the son of Shaykh Hasan-i Buzurg, campaigned successfully against the Qara Qoyunlu, the Shirvan-Shah, the Golden Horde and the Muzaffarids, expanding from Baghdad to Azerbaijan and establishing his capital in Tabriz until the end of his reign. But he was also a great sponsor of the arts, and was described as a refined and artistic ruler, himself capable in various arts. The majority of the paintings of the Great Jalayirid Shāhnāma are attributed to his reign. He is also credited with a remarkable Kalila and Dimna, dated to 1370-74 (Istanbul University Library F.1422).

===== Naturalism and realism =====
In the realm of Persian painting, the Jalayirid period is considered a bridge between the Great Mongol Shahnameh and the apex of Persian painting during the Timurid and Safavid periods. During the reign of the Jalayirids, new developments were introduced to Persian art, including taking inspiration from Chinese painting, changes in the depiction of nature, and the usage of margins for additions to paintings. Due to these innovations, the Great Jalayirid Shahnameh, along with other works of the Jalayirid era, was a primary inspiration for later Persian artists, and have thus been called a “source” of modern Persian painting. Bernard O’Kane has further argued that, due to its depth of imagery, texture, and placement of figures, the Great Jalayirid Shahnameh was a pinnacle of Persian painting, matching the masterpieces of the Timurid and Safavid eras. Despite their influence, remarkably few dated manuscripts survive from the Jalayirid period, and efforts to understand the nature and extent of artistic production under the dynasty are ongoing.

===== Romanticism =====
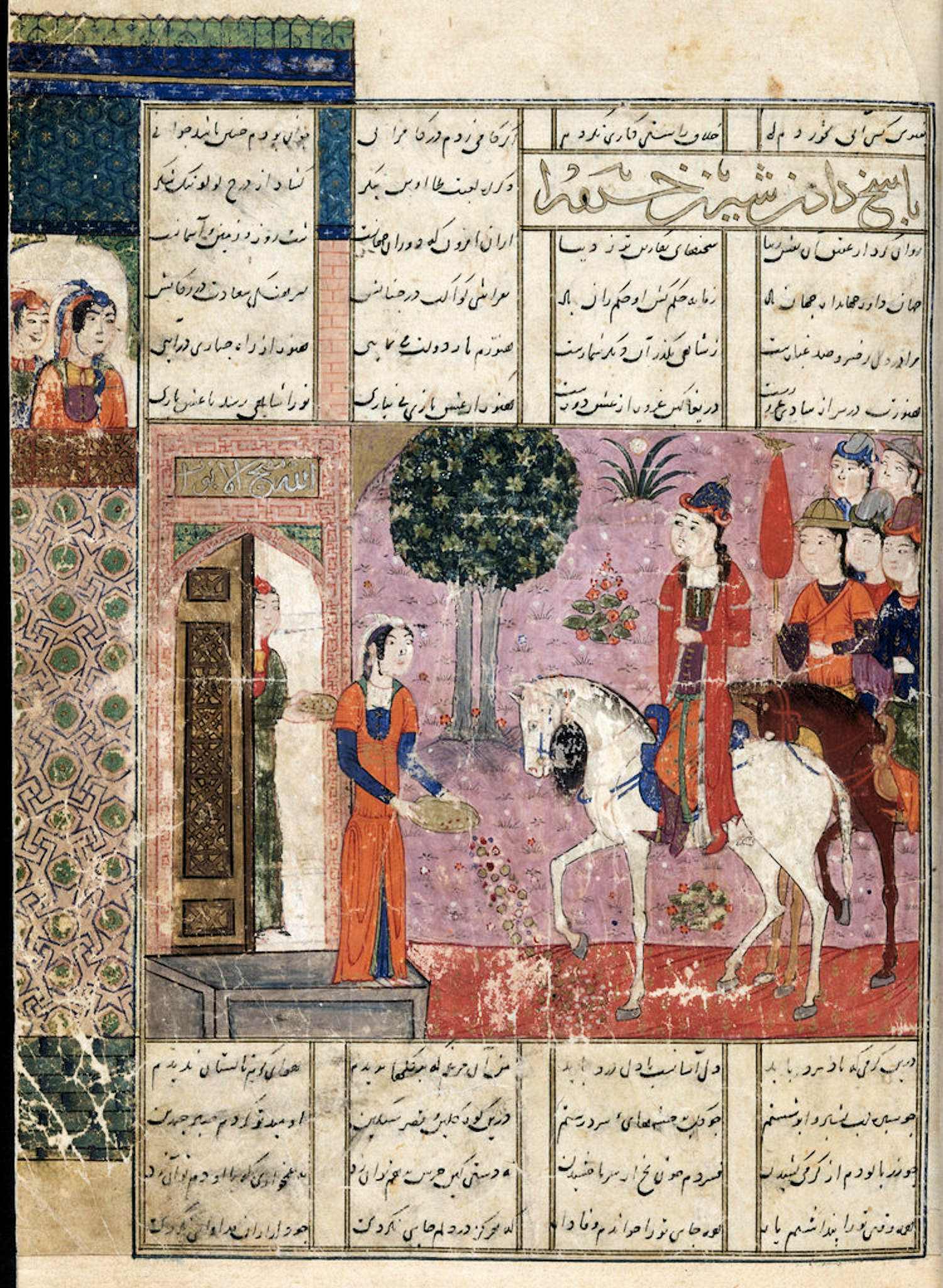
The Jalayirid Khamsa of Nizami (British Library, Or.13297) is the earliest known illustrated manuscript of the Khamsa of Nizami. Baghdad, 1386-88.

The Jalayirid Sultanate at the beginning of rule of Sultan Ahmad Jalayir experimented with some of the most significant evolutions in the literature of the period, moving from the monumental and epic character of the Shahmanahs towards more romantic and poetic illustrated manuscripts. One such pivotal creation is the Khamsa of Nizami (British Library, Or.13297), the earliest securely dated illustrated copy of the Khamsa of Nizami. It was created in 1386–88 in Baghdad, for Sultan Ahmad Jalayir. A few years later, the 1396 Khamsah of Khvaju Kirmani (British Library, Add 18113), also created in Jalayirid Baghdad, already reached some of the highest artistic levels, with full-page romantic art.

===== Later influences =====
It is known that some illustrated manuscripts of the Jalayirids were copied and emulated by the Timurids. A written remark by Dust Muhammad mentions that the Timurid ruler Baysunghur ordered a book to be made with the exact same specifications (dimensions, arrangement of text, illustrations) as a Jalayirid original. In the 16th century, Dust Muhammad described the Timurid Baysunghur's efforts at emulating Jalayirid art, after his occupation of Tabriz in 1421 and capture of artists from Tabriz:

His Highness Baysunghur Mirza had Master Sidi Ahmad the painter, Khwaja Ali the portraitist and Master Qiwamuddin the bookbinder brought from Tabriz and ordered that after the pleasing manner of Sultan Ahmad of Baghdad's miscellany, they should produce a book in exactly the same format and layout and with the same scenes depicted. The copying of it was given into the charge of Mawlana Fariduddin Ja 'far. The binding was commissioned of the aforementioned Master Qiwamuddin, by whom inlay in bindings was invented; and Mir Khalil was put in charge of decoration and depiction of scenes.

— Preface to the Bahram Mirza Album (extract), by Dust Muhammad (1544).

Later manuscripts such as the Mihr u Mushtari (1419), which is generally considered as the first instance of Turkman style, seem to be highly indebted to earlier Jalayirid manuscripts, such as the 1386-88 Khamsa of Nizami (British Library, Or.13297), or the 1396 Khamsah of Khvaju Kirmani (British Library, Add 18113), both created in Baghdad: the depictions of Faridun on horseback in Or.13297 (fol. 19a), or the attitude of the Payk groom looking backward in Add 18113 (fol. 85r), are almost exactly reproduced in the 1419-20 Mihr u Mushtari manuscript.

==== Nastaliq calligraphy ====
Jalayirid manuscripts also demonstrate some of the earliest uses of Nastaliq calligraphy. They appear in the 1396 Khamsah by Khvaju Kirmani, created in Baghdad. The new calligraphy was further disseminated by the calligrapher Farid al-Din Jafar of Tabriz at the Timurid court of Baysunghur.

=== Decline ===
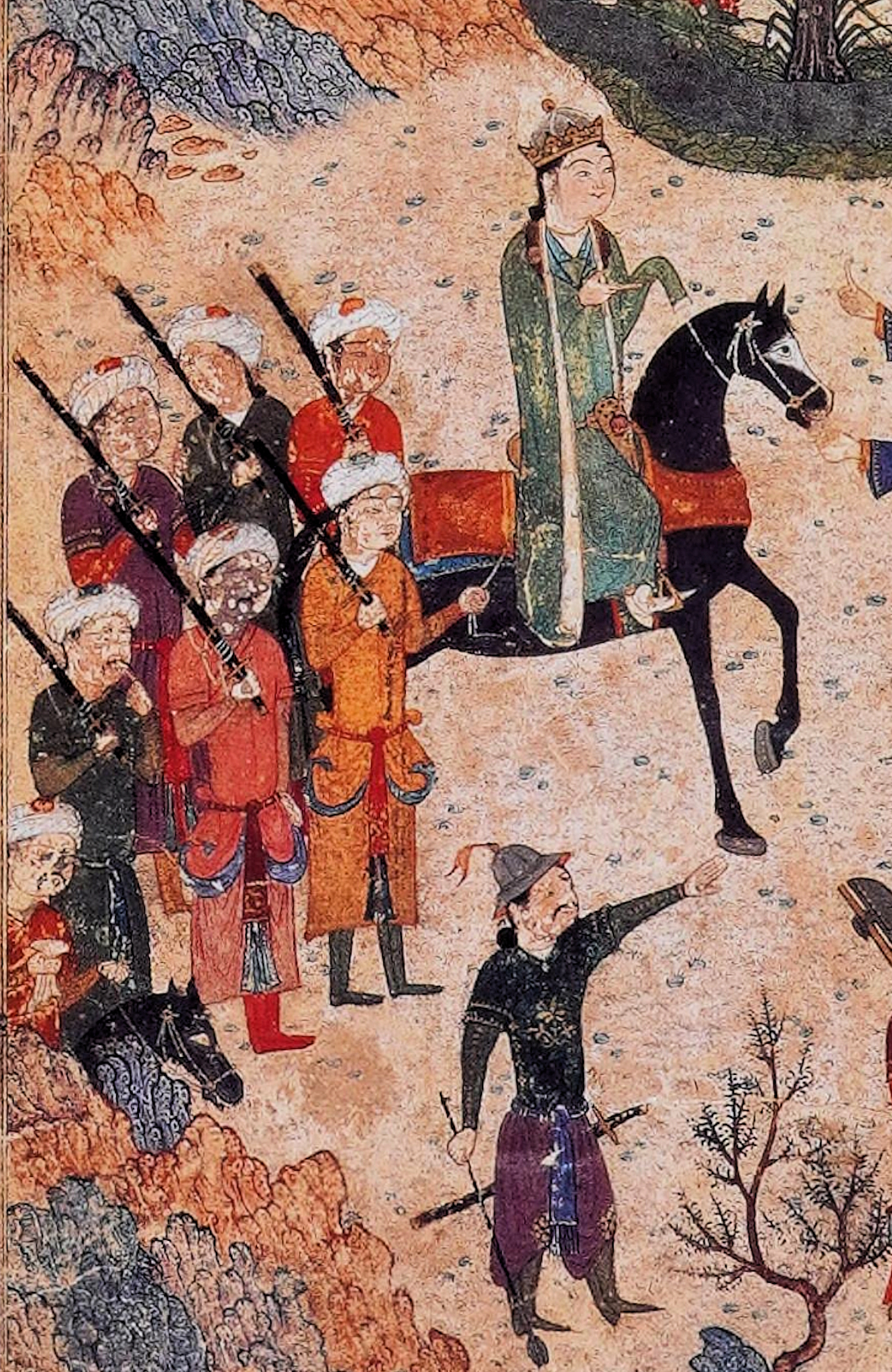
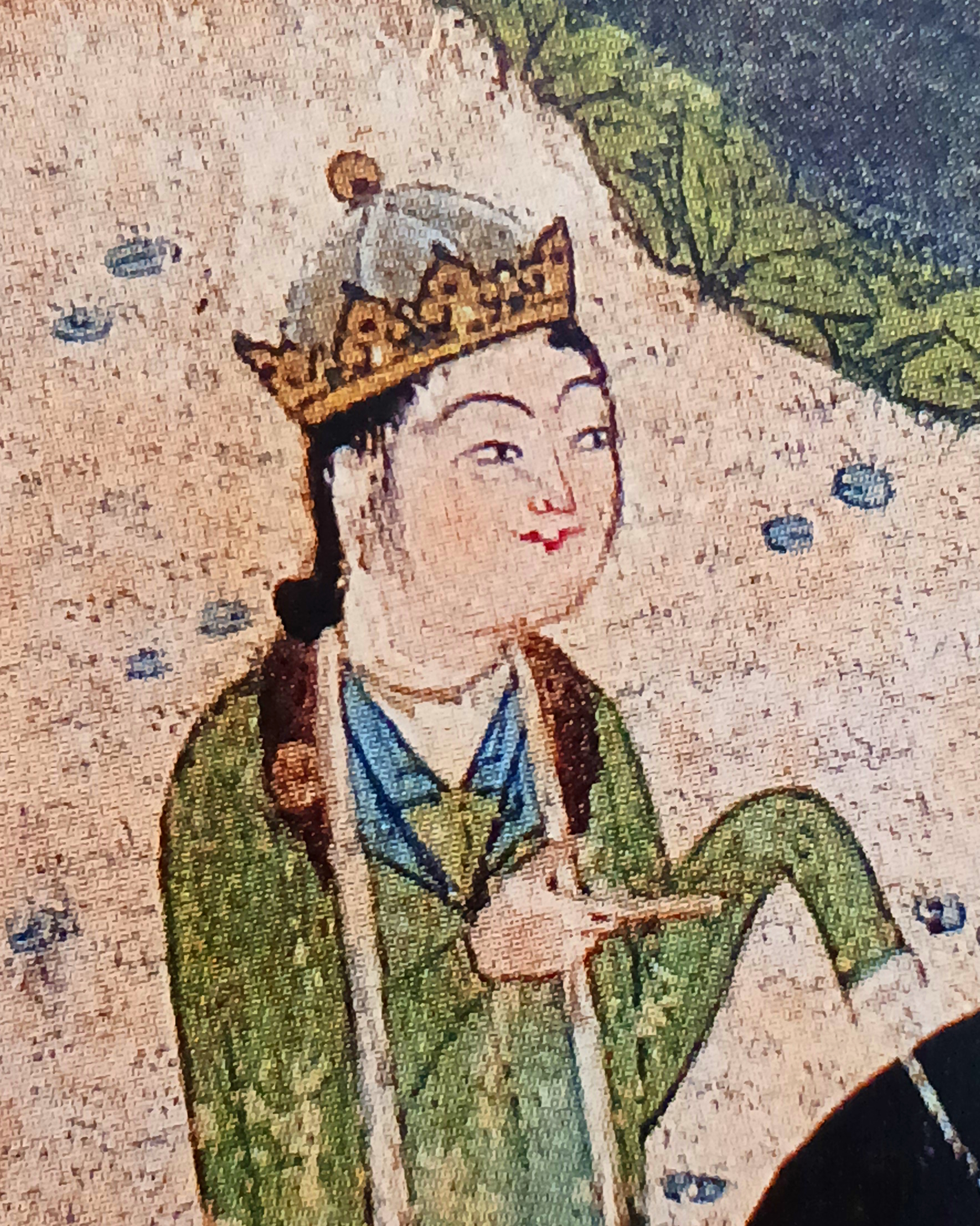
Contemporary portrait of Sultan Ahmad Jalayir (ruled 1382–1410) with armed retinue. Khamsah by Khvaju Kirmani (1396), Baghdad.

As soon as Shaikh Hussain Jalayir (ruled 1374-1382) started his reign, Tabriz was raided by the Muzaffarids, hailing from Isfahan. In 1376, Shaikh Hussain Jalayir finally took up residence in Tabriz. In the following spring, he undertook a successful campaign against the Qara Qoyunlu under Bayram Khwaja, who had been raiding from the west.

Shaikh Hussain Jalayir lost his supporters because of the external enemies and conflicts within the amirs. His brother Sultan Ahmad Jalayir came to power as a result of a plot against him. Sultan Ahmad advanced with an armed force from Ardabil, captured Tabriz, and executed his brother. Ahmad's other brothers, Shaikh 'Ali and Bayazid opposed him. To secure his position, Ahmad requested the assistance of the Kara Koyunlu ruler Qara Mahammad. Shaikh 'Ali fell in battle against the Kara Koyunlu.

In the spring of 1384, the Chagatai amir Timur attacked the Jalayirids and Qara Qoyunlus of Azerbaijan. Although Sultan Ahmad was not captured, his subordinates in Soltaniyeh failed to defend the town and Timur took it with a minimum of resistance.

In the midst of Timur's absence, Sultan Ahmad had to deal with an invasion by Tokhtamysh, Khan of the Golden Horde in 1385. Tabriz was briefly looted by the Golden Horde in 1385.

=== Loss of Tabriz (1386-1405) and Baghdad (1393) to the Timurids ===
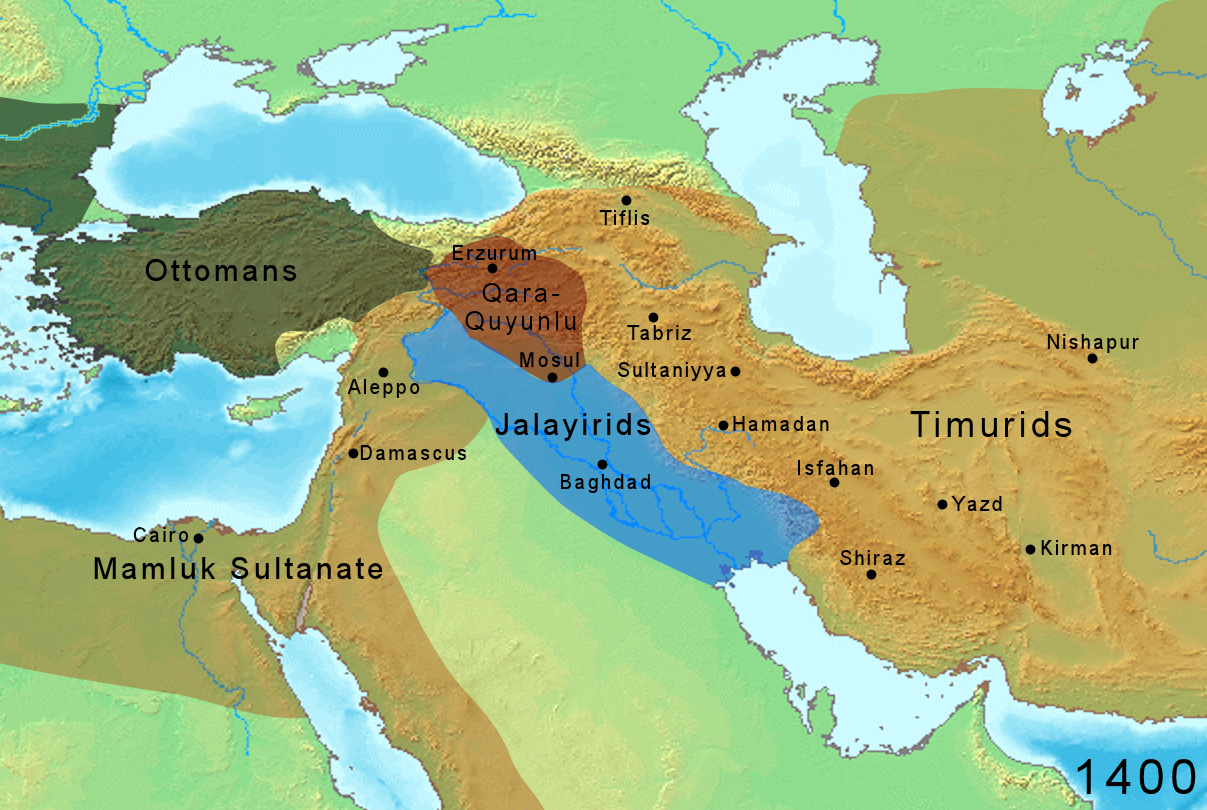
Jalayirid, Qara Qoyunlu and Timurid territories in 1400.

The 1385 Golden Horde raid of Tabriz had significantly weakened Ahmad's position and so he could not combat Timur when he attacked with his Chagatai army in 1386. Tabriz was captured by Timur, who encamped in Sham-Azam and levied a new tax on the inhabitants. Adil Aqa collected the tribute but was executed by Timur, who suspected him of corruption. Azerbaijan from this point on remained in the control of the Timurids, as Ahmad could not recover the province. The region from Azerbaijan to Darband was entrusted to Timur's son Miran Shah in 1392, with Tabriz as the capital.

In 1393, Timur destroyed the Muzaffarids in the Battle of Shiraz (1393), and then renewed his campaigns against the Jalayirids and captured Baghdad (1393), and Ahmad Jalayir fled the city and sought refuge with the Mamluk Sultanate. Timur captured Ahamd Jalayir's son Ala-al-Dawla and numerous artists and scholars who he brought to Samarkand. Ahmad Jalayir first went to Damascus, and later to Cairo, where he was received by the Mamluk sultan Barquq. The Mamluks were rivals of Timur, so offering Ahmad Jalayir protection was politically useful in opposing Timurid expansion. The Mamluk army accompanied Ahmad Jalayir back to his lands, leading to the successful capture of Baghdad (1394). Besides this episode, from 1386 to 1401, Ahmad Jalayir was essentially based in Baghdad.

In 1395, Miran Shah became insane in Tabriz, committing unwarranted excecutions and destructions. Miran Shah attempted to capture Baghdad in 1398, but in vain. Timur, upon returning from his 1398–1399 Indian campaign, went immediately to Azerbaijian and executed Miran Shah's supporters in 1399-1400.

The Timurids would hold onto Tabriz and its region for 4 more years, Tabriz now under the rule of Miran Shah's son Mirza Umar (1383–1407).

=== Loss of Baghdad to the Timurids (1401–1405) ===
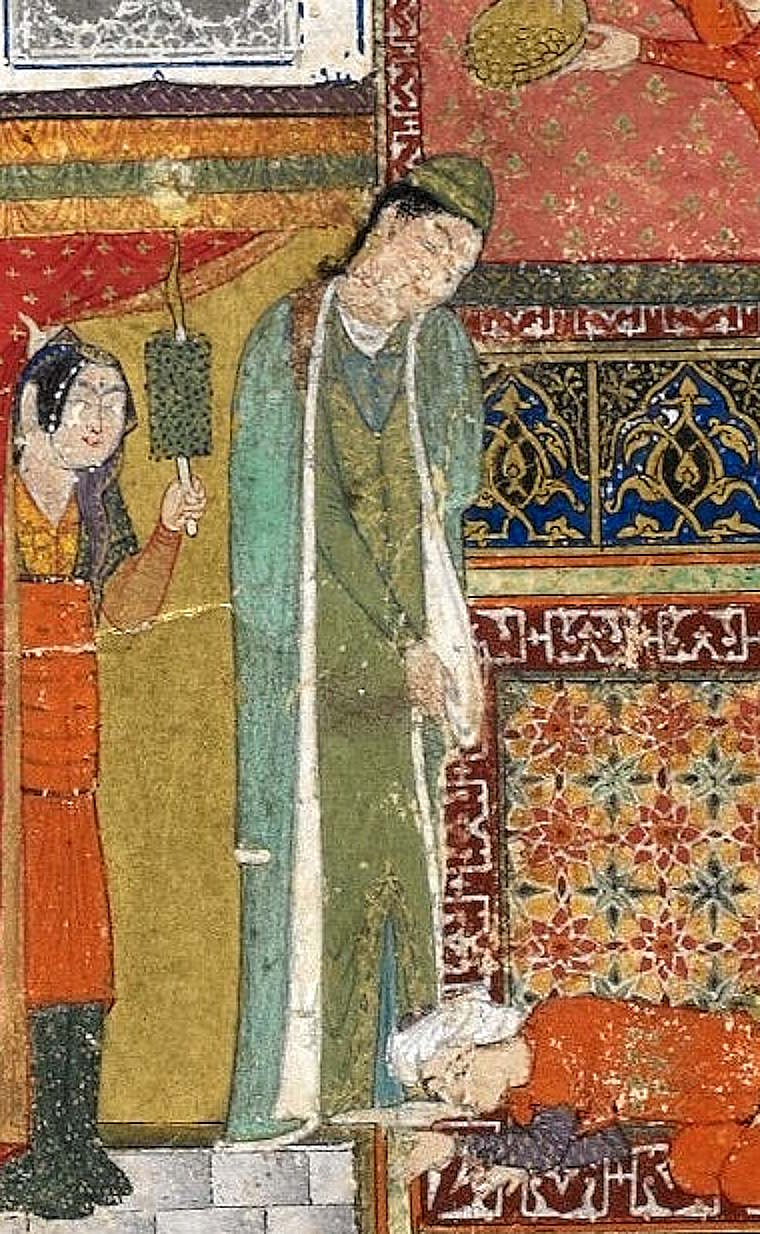
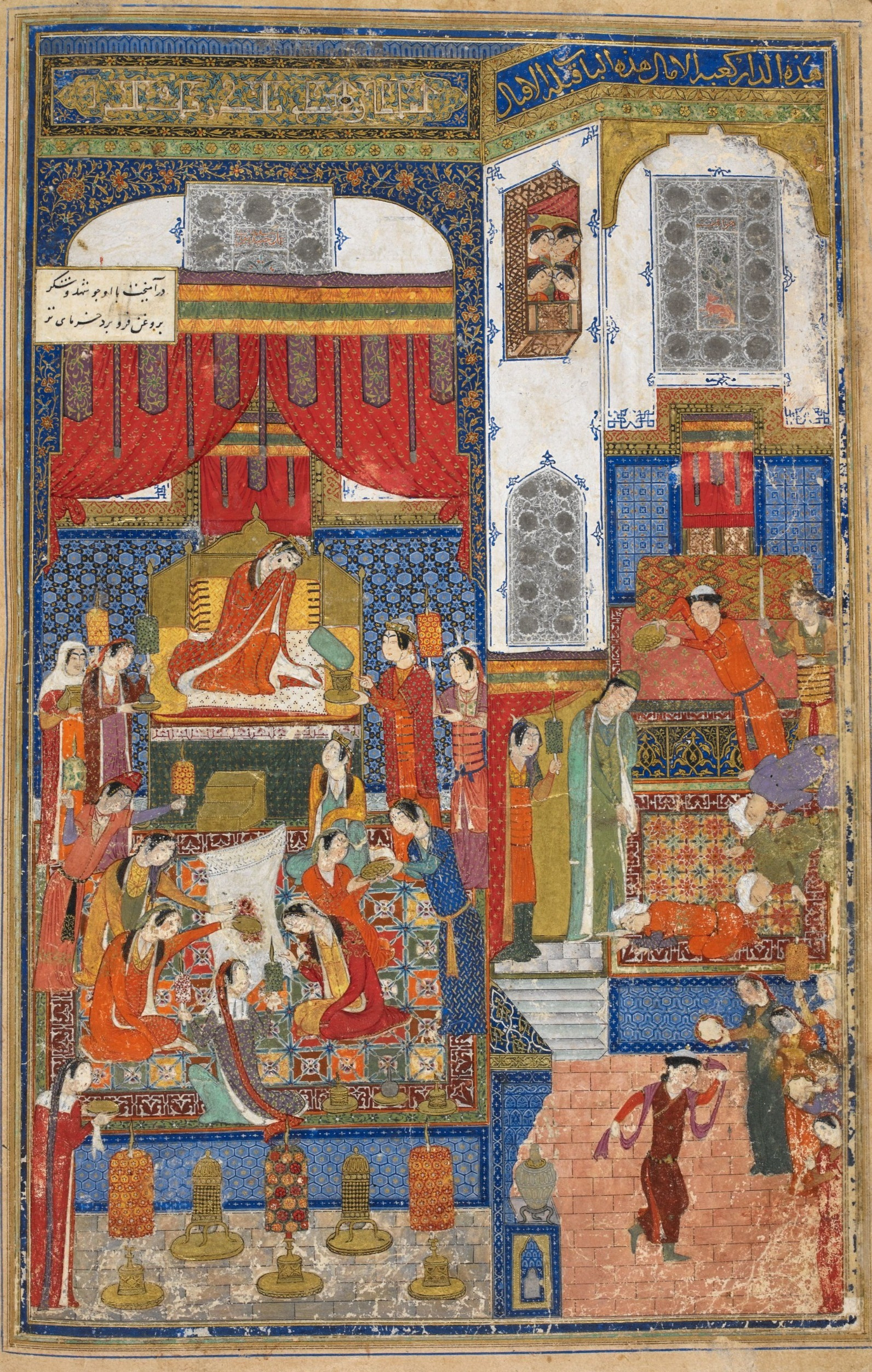
Likely depiction of an unspecified marriage of Sultan Ahmad Jalayir (shown here leaving the nuptial room) in Baghdad. Painted by Junayd, Khamsah by Khvaju Kirmani (1396, Baghdad). This is "the most firmly dated illustrated and high-quality Jalayirid manuscript".

In 1401, Baghdad, then under Ahmad Jalayir, revolted. Timur was campaigning in Syria, and Sultan Ahmad chose to abandon Baghdad beforehand, this time take refuge with the Ottoman Sultan Bayezid I. Timur moved to launch an offensive, and captured the city in the siege of Baghdad (1401). The city suffered a devastating sack with large-scale destruction and massacres. Timur besieged Baghdad for forty days and then massacred its inhabitants for resisting. The Mongol army looted the treasury and razed much of the city, except for mosques and madrasas. Contemporaries reported that each Mongol soldier was ordered to bring at least one severed head of an inhabitant. Pyramids were made with the skulls of the defenders. Only one out of a hundred of the city's inhabitants reportedly survived the massacre to be sold into slavery.

In Baghdad in 1401 (or possibly earlier on the occasion of the Siege of Baghdad (1393), Dust Muhammad reports that Timur captured the Jalayirid miniature artist Khwaja Abdul-Hayy to bring him back to the Timurid court in Samarkand, where his style was then followed by local court artists:

When the realm-conquering banners of Timur Kiiragan cast the ray of the caliphate in subjugating the realm of Baghdad, and he made that Abode of Peace the residence of the caliphal throne for a few days, Khwaja Abdul-Hayy was taken along with the celestial army to the Abode of the Sultanate Samarqand, where he died. After the Khwaja's death all masters imitated his works.

— Dust Muhammad, preface to Bahram Mirza Album (1544).

The Jalayirid defenders of Siege of Baghdad (1401) appear in a Timurid miniature of the Zafarnama (Book of Victory) of 1436, as defenders on the walls of the city.

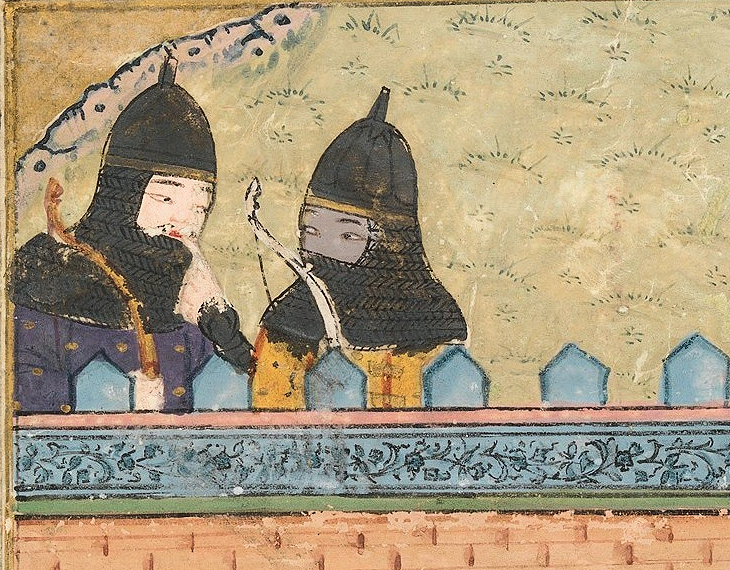
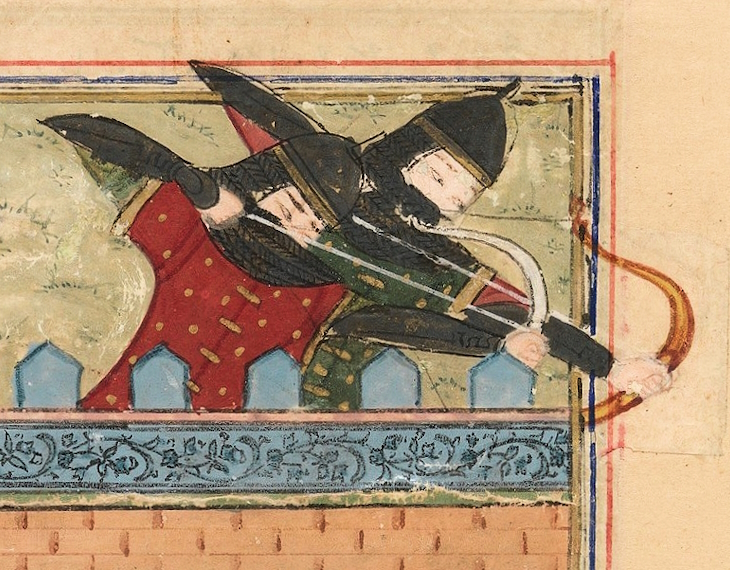
Jalayirid troops defending Baghdad against the Timurids in the Siege of Baghdad (1401). Timurid Zafarnama (Book of Victory) of 1436

The Kara Koyunlu ruler Kara Yusuf too retreated to Mosul to avoid a sudden raid, and was able to take shelter in Damascus under the protection of the Ottoman sultan Bayezid I in 1401. Qara Yusuf was welcomed by Sheikh Mahmud, the nâib of Damascus. Not long after, Sultan Ahmed Jalayir also came to Damascus. Not wanting to worsen relations with Amir Timur, Nasir-ad-Din Faraj agreed to capture Qara Yusuf and Sultan Ahmed Jalayir, and hand them over to Timur. Instead, Sultan Ahmad Jalayir and Qara Yusuf were imprisoned on the order of Nasir-ad-Din Faraj, the Mamluk Sultan of Egypt. Together in prison, the two leaders renewed their friendship, making an agreement that Sultan Ahmed Jalayir should keep Baghdad while Qara Yusuf would have Azerbaijan. Ahmad also adopted Qara Yusuf's son Pirbudag.

The hosting of Kara Yusuf by Bayezid I was one of the main reasons Timur then launched a campaign against the Ottomans. He was able to reach Damascus by escaping into the desert. Timur continued as he conquered Aleppo, Damascus and eastern Anatolia. In 1402 he defeated the Ottomans in the momentous Battle of Ankara, plunging the Ottoman Empire into a civil war.

=== Return to Baghdad (1405) ===
When Timur died in 1405 Nasir-ad-Din Faraj released Sultan Ahmad Jalayir and Qara Yusuf from captivity in Damascus. However, according to Faruk Sümer, they were released on the orders of rebellious wali of Damascus – Sheykh Mahmud.

Sultan Ahmad Jalayir, taking advantage of a local insurrection, finally managed to recapture the city of Baghdad with the help of Qara Yusuf leading his Qara Koyunlu troops. He eliminated the administration of Mirza Ömer, son of Miran Shah, who had been in charge of ruling the city for the Timurids.

On October 1406, Qara Yusuf defeated the Timurid prince Abu Bakr Mirza, son of Miran Shah, at the Battle of Nakhchivan (1406), taking back control of Tabriz. He advanced as far as Sultaniyya, taking the population of this town to Tabriz, Ardabil and Maragha. Abu Bakr Mirza soon returned, but Qara Yusuf defeated him at Sardarud, south of Tabriz, where Miran Shah also fell in battle. Qara Yusuf astutely put his own son on the throne of Tabriz, the young Pirbudag, who was also Ahmad Jalyir's adoptive son. Ahmad Jalyir appear to be satisfied with the choice, but eventually occupied Tabriz when Qara Yusuf was away in Armenia.

=== Return to Tabriz, then loss to the Qara Qoyunlu (1405–1410) ===
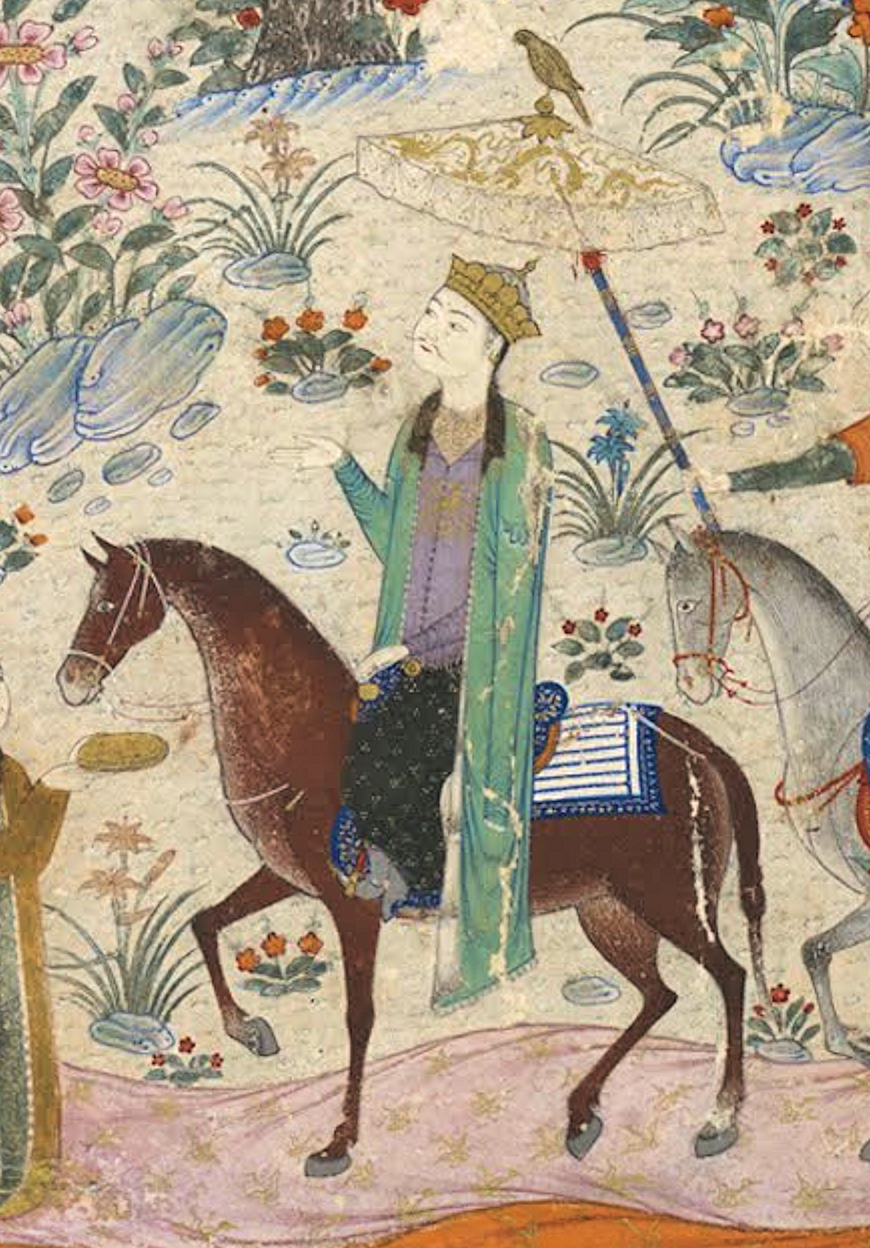
Royal figure in Khusraw at the castle of Shirin (Freer Galery of Art). Tabriz, 1405-1410.

After expelling Qara Yusuf from Tabriz, Ahmad Jalayir would hold residence there between 1406 and 1410.

While in Tabriz, Ahmad Jalayir is known for another remarkable illustrated manuscript, the Khosrow and Shirin (Freer Galery of Art). The style of this work had much in common with the productions of Baghdad, the other Jalayirid capital, but with a higher degree of finition.

In the fall of 1409, Qara Yusuf came back, entered Tabriz and sent a raiding party to Shirvan, especially Shaki, which was fruitless. Qara Yusuf defeated and killed the last great Jalayirid ruler Ahmad Jalayir in 1410.

=== Loss of Baghdad to the Qara Qoyunlu (1410) ===
Ahmad's nephew Shah Walad Jalayir briefly succeeded him in Baghdad but the Qara Qoyunlu soon captured the city. The illustrated manuscript Basatin al-uns (TSMK Ms. R. 1032) seems to have been created at the juncture of these events, and may be one of the last manuscripts created by the Jalayirids in Baghdad, since the dedication to Ahmad Jalayir seems to have been damaged by the invaders and the illustrations remained unfinished. After the death of Sultan Ahmad Jalayir, some artist stayed in Tabriz, but others leaved for Isfahan and Shiraz, to work for another famous patron and bibliophile, the Timurid governor Iskandar Sultan, ruler of Fars from 1409 to 1414.

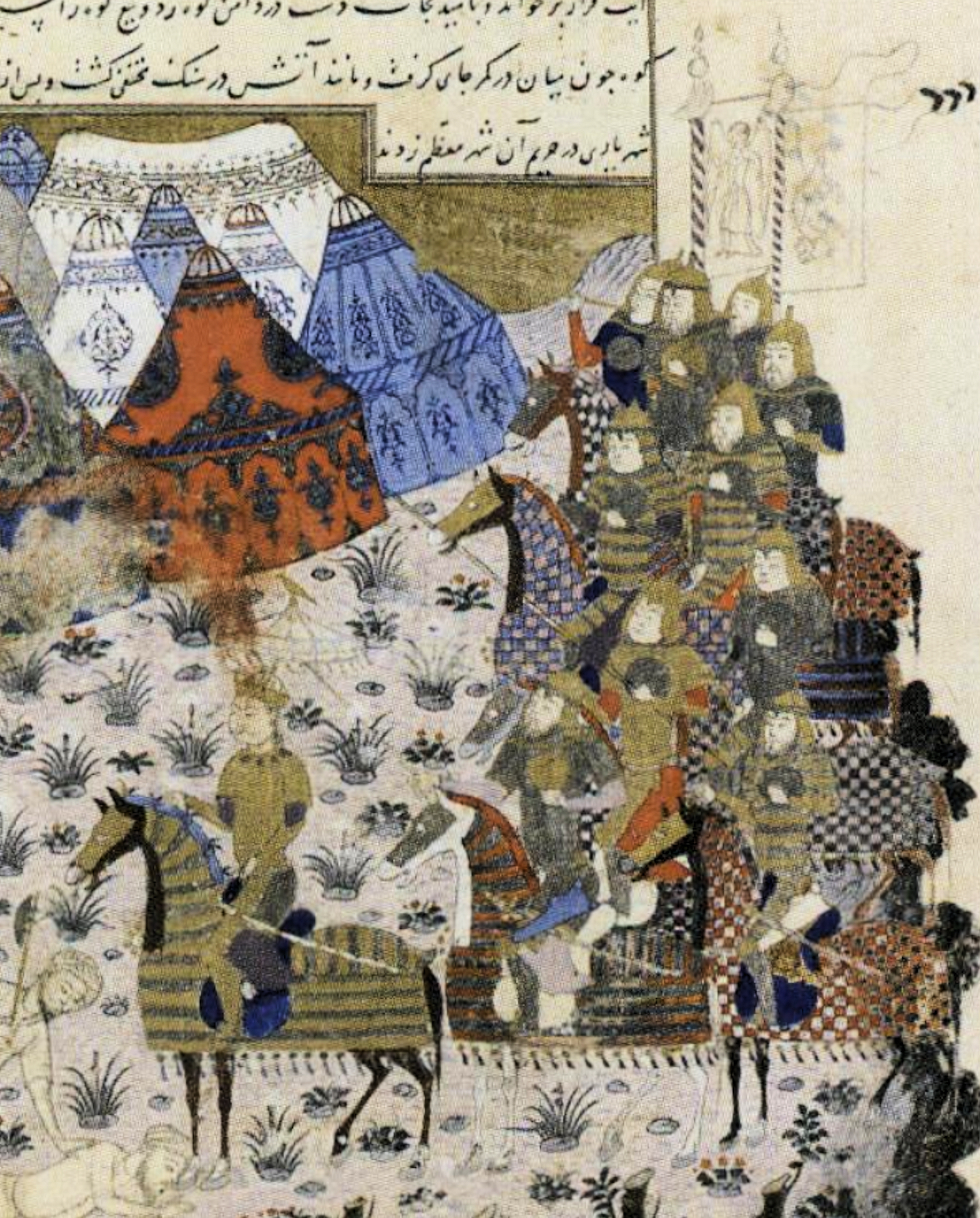
A Jalayirid copy of a Delhi Sultanate manuscript depicting ruler Ghiyath al-Din Tughluq leading his troops in the capture of the city of Tirhut. Muhammad Sadr Ala-i in his work Basātin al-uns, 1410 copy of 1326 original, in Baghdad (Topkapi Palace Museum Library, Ms. R.1032).

After 1410, the remnants of the Jalayirid dynasty were eventually pushed south into lower Iraq, ruling over the towns of Hillah, Wasit and Basra. In 1423, the penultimate ruler of the Jalayirid dynasty, Solṭān Moḥammad, son of Šāh Valad, was expelled from Shushtar by the Timurid Governor of Fars Ibrahim Sultan. Solṭān Moḥammad had to flee to Wasit and then to al-Ḥella in southern Iraq, but from there he tried to besiege Baghdad in 1424, but failed and died July 1424. The last Jalayerid ruler, Ḥosayn II ibn ʿAlāʾ-al-Dawla, lost internal support due to his licentious behavior. His amirs invited in the Qarā Qoyunlu prince Aspān, who managed to capture al-Ḥella in October 1431. Hosayn was pursued and finally killed on 9 November 1431, bringing a complete end to the dynasty.

== Government ==
The Jalayirid administration was modeled after Ilkhanate protocols, with documents in Persian and Mongolian. Its diplomatic correspondence also resembled the Ilkhanate's, using a red ink square seal with Islamic phrases in Arabic.

== International influences in Jalayirid art ==
Jalayirid art was characterized by increased naturalism. Parallels have been noted with the contemporary naturalistic Late Gothic trends, and cross-cultural exchanges, both with the Latin West and Chinese art have been suggested. In effect, Christian communities of European merchants (Genoese, Venetian, Pisan, French, Catalan) had been thriving in the Ilkhanid capitals of Tabriz and Soltaniyeh, and although they faltered in the troubles after the end of the Ilkhanate and the Black Death (1348-1350), were still encouraged by the Jalayirid Sultan Uvays I through correspondence offering road security and reduced taxes. The artist Dust Muhammad acknowledged China and Europe while describing the contributions of the great naturalistic artist Ahmad Musa, active at the end of the Ilkhanate and during the Jalayirid period:

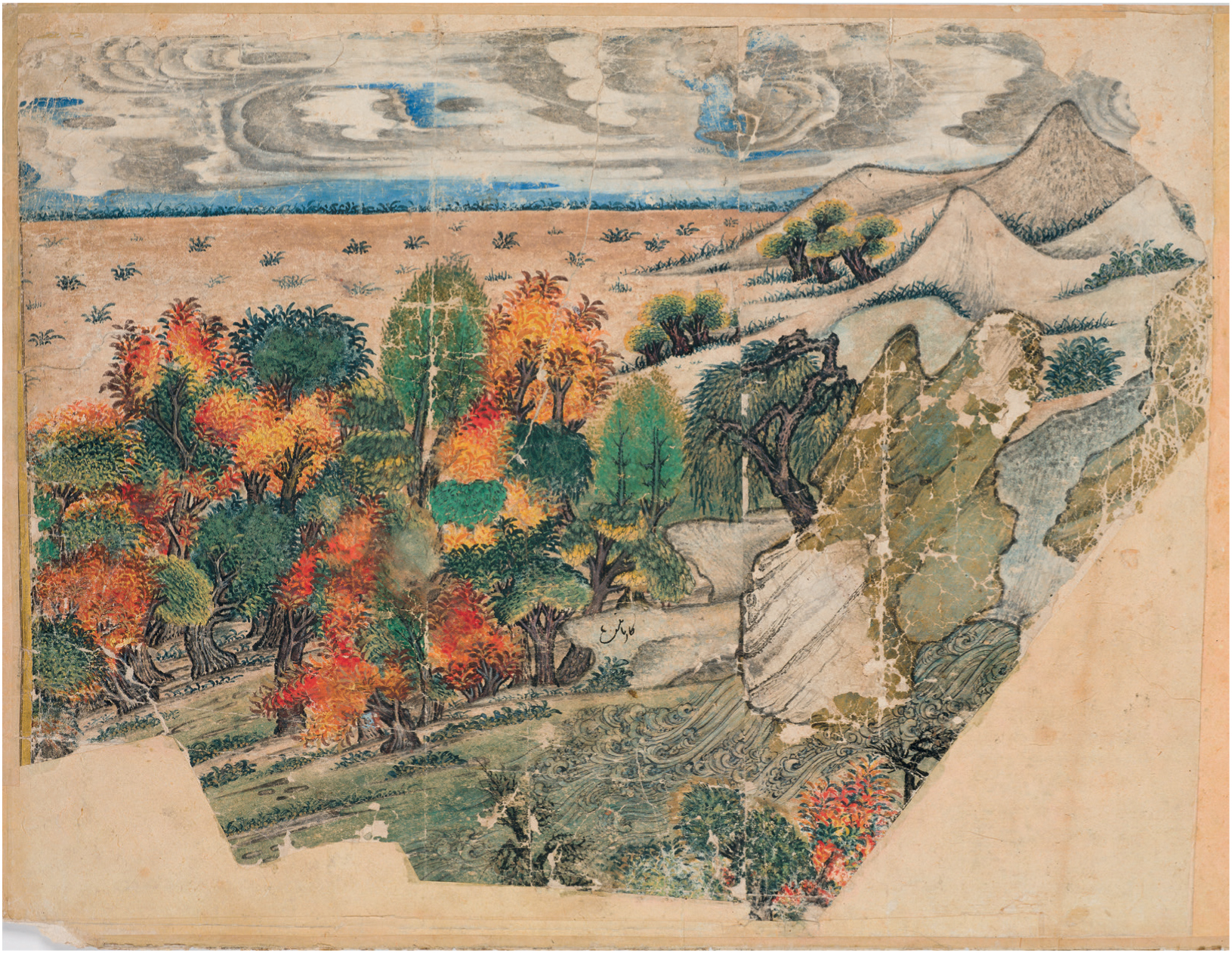
Autumn Landscape, a likely Jalayirid work in the Chinese manner. Tabriz or Baghdad, mid-14th century. TSMK, H. 2153.

The custom of portraiture flourished in the lands of Cathay and the Franks until sharp-penned Mercury scrivened the rescript of rule in the name of Sultan Abusaʿid Khudaybanda. Master Ahmad Musa, who was his father’s pupil, lifted the veil from the face of depiction, and the [style of] depiction that is now current was invented by him. Among the scenes by him that lighted on the page of the world in the reign of the aforementioned emperor, an Abusaʿidnama, a Kalila u Dimna, a Miʿrajnama calligraphed by Mawlana Abdullah Sayrafi, and a Tarikh-i Chingizi in beautiful script by an unknown hand were in the library of the late emperor Sultan-Husayn Mirza

— Preface to the Bahram Mirza Album (extract), by Dust Muhammad (1544)..

Albums of the period, such as Saray Album H.2153 or Saray Album H.2160 often contain foreign work or works "in the manner of", complete with labelled inscriptions of as “Cathayan work” (kāri khaṭāy/khiṭāy) or “Frankish work” (kāri farang/firang). One such example is the a Europeanizing ink and wash drawing, named Eight Figures in European Attire, a work "in the Frankish manner" in the European "grisaille" style, located next to works attributed to Ahmad Musa (H. 2153, fols. 55r, 54v). Another Jalayirid work, named Celestial Vision, combines elements from the arts of Europe (a Christian scene of enlightenment, in the style of Taddeo Gaddi’s Annunciation to the Shepherds (1327–30) of Pietro Lorenzetti’s Stigmata of St. Francis (c. 1320), and China (a bent tree, a five-clawed two-horned imperial dragon, Chinese cloud bands).

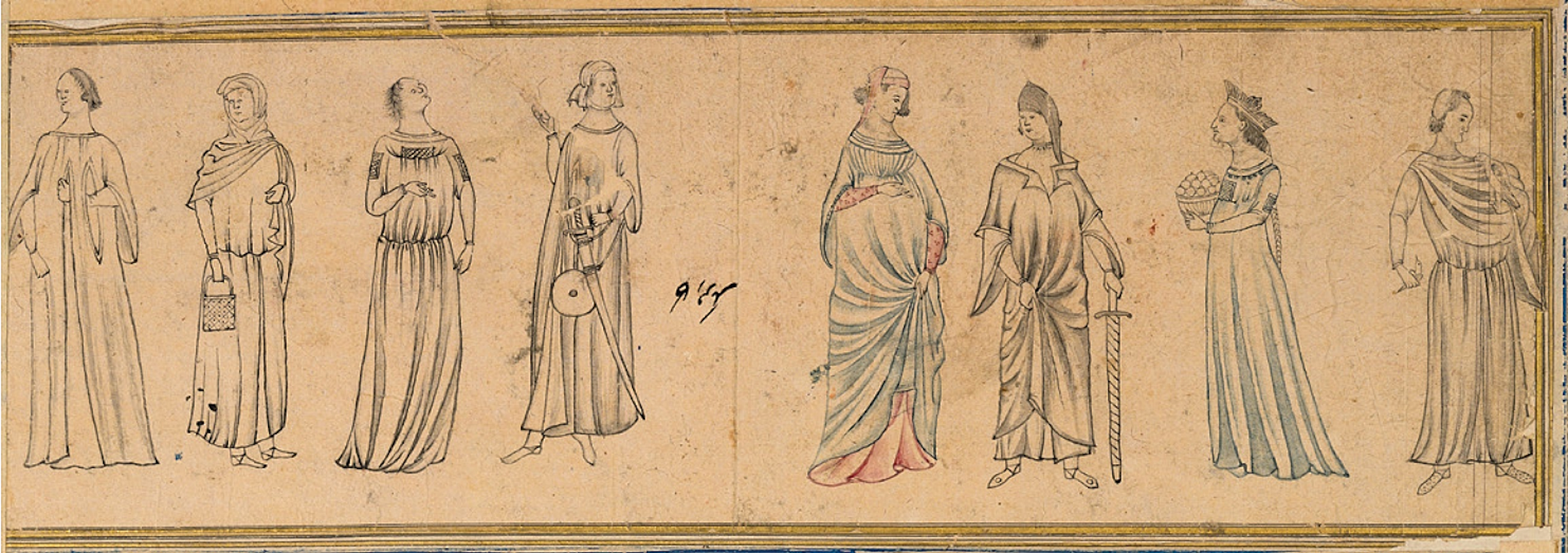
Eight Figures in European Attire, Jalayirid drawing in European style. Baghdad or Tabriz, c. 1370. Saray Album H.2153.

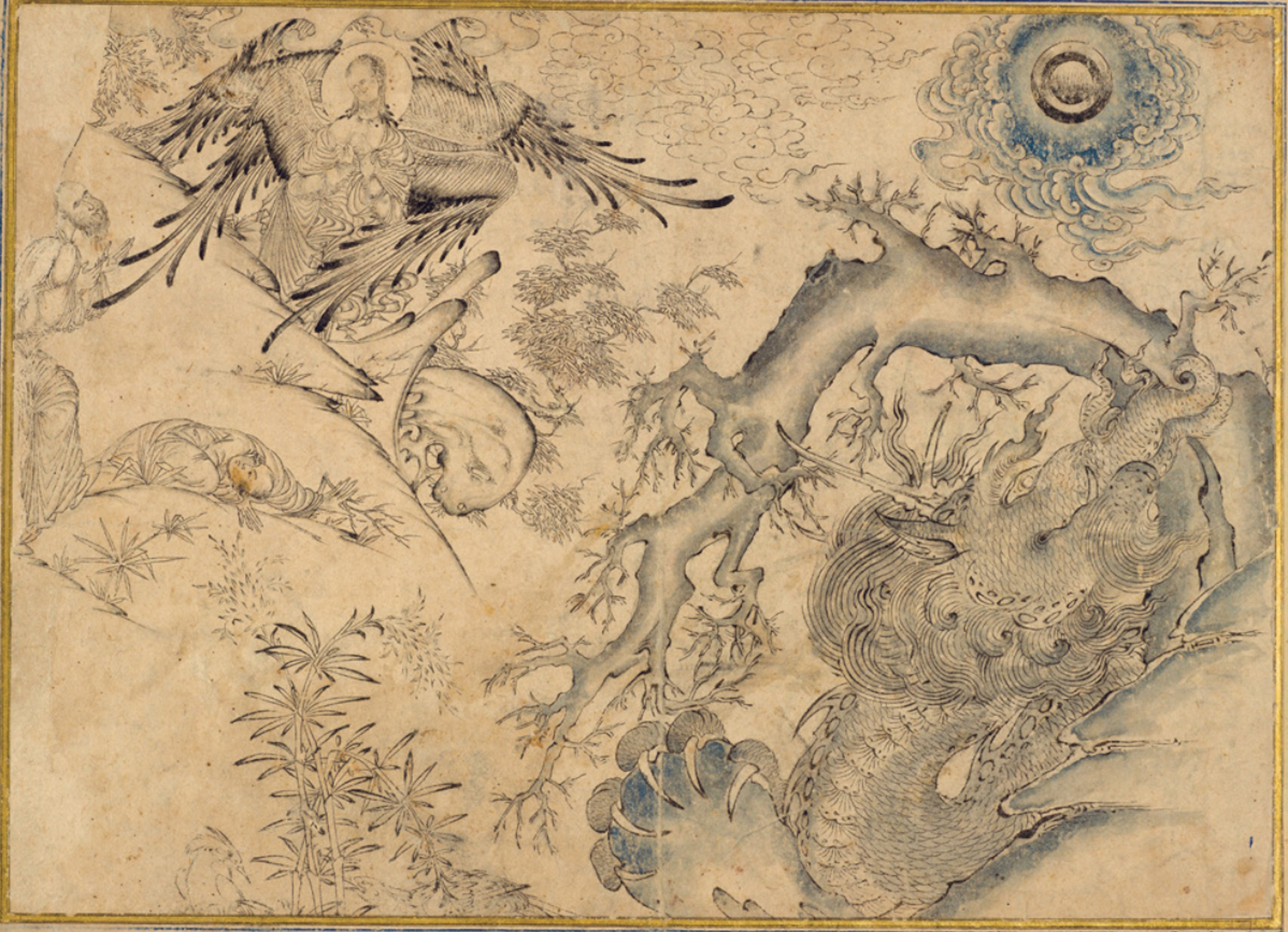
Celestial Vision, Jalayirid drawing combining European and Chinese style. Baghdad or Tabriz, c. 1375–1400. TSMK, H. 2153

== Rulers ==
Title/Name	Personal name	Reign	Coinage
Taj-ud-Din تاج الدین	Hasan Buzurg	1336–1356	Jalayrids coinage, time of Shaykh Hasan Buzurg. Baghdad mint. Dated AH 749? (AD 1348-9). Reverse legend al-sultan al-a‘zam /khan khallada mulkahu
Mu'izz-ud-duniya wa al-Din معز الدنیا والدین; Bahadur Khan بهادرخان	Shaykh Uways Jalayir	1356–1374	Gold coin of Shaykh Uways I (1356-1374), Baghdad mint, dated AH 762 (AD 1360-1)
Jalal-ud-Din جلال الدین	Shaikh Hasan Jalayir	1374	
Ghiyas-ud-Din غیاث الدین	Shaikh Hussain Jalayir	1374–1382	Coinage of Jalal al-Din Husayn I. Madinat al-Salam Baghdad mint. Dated AH [78]2 (AD 1381/2)
	Shaikh Bayazid Jalayir; Ruler of Iraq-i 'Ajam at Soltaniyeh and contender for the throne	1382–1384	
Sultan سلطان	Sultan Ahmed Jalayir; Ruler of Iraq-i 'Arab at Baghdad and contender for the throne	1382–1410	Coinage of Sultan Ahmad Jalayir. Baghdad mint. Dated AH 788 (1386-7)
	Shah Walad Jalayir son of Shaikh Ali Jalayir	1410–1411	
	Tandu Khatun	1411–1419	
Sultan سلطان	Mahmud bin Shah Walad Jalayir under tutelage of Tandu Khatun	1411–1415	
Sultan سلطان	Uwais II	1415–1421	
Sultan سلطان	Muhammad bin Shah Walad Jalayir	1421–1422	
Sultan سلطان	Mahmud II	1422–1424	
	Hussain II	1424–1432	

== Genealogy of House of Jalayir ==
House of Jalayir

Jalayirid Sultanate

Hasan I r. 1336–1356
Uways I r. 1356–1374
Hasan II r. 1374–1374	Husayn I r. 1374–1382	Ali r. 1378–1382	Bayazid r. 1382–1384	Ahmad r. 1382–1410
Shah-Walad r. 1410–1411	Ala ad-Dawla
Mahmud r. 1411–1419	Uways II r. 1415–1421	Muhammad r. 1425–1427	Husayn II r. 1427–1432

== See also ==
- Chupanids
- Mongol invasions of Azerbaijan

== Sources ==
- Bosworth, C. Edmund (31 August 2007). Historic Cities of the Islamic World. BRILL. ISBN 978-90-474-2383-6.
- Hasanzade, Jamila; Goyushov, Nasib; Vasilyeva, Olga; Yastrebova, Olga (2021). The Magic of the Pen: Selected Miniatures from the Khamsa of Nizami Ganjavi (PDF). Boyut Publishing Group / Ones Media. ISBN 978-9952-8413-5-0.
- Jackson, Peter (2008). "Jalayerids". Encyclopaedia Iranica, Vol. XIV, Fasc. 4. pp. 415–419.
- Jackson, Peter (2014). Jalayerids. Encyclopedia Iranica Vol. XIV, Fasc. 4. pp. 415–419.
- Jackson, Peter; Lockhart, Laurence, eds. (1986). The Cambridge History of Iran, Volume 6: The Timurid and Safavid periods. Cambridge University Press. ISBN 0521200946.
- Limbert, John W. (2011). Shiraz in the Age of Hafez: The Glory of a Medieval Persian City. University of Washington Press. pp. 1–192. ISBN 9780295802886.
- Sims, Eleanor; Marshak, Boris Ilʹich; Grube, Ernst J. (1 January 2002). Peerless Images: Persian Painting and Its Sources. Yale University Press. p. 262. ISBN 978-0-300-09038-3.
- Titley, Norah (1978). "A Khamsa of Nizami Dated Herat, 1421". The British Library Journal. 4 (2): 161–186.
- Wing, Patrick (2016). The Jalayirids: Dynastic State Formation in the Mongol Middle East. Edinburgh University Press. ISBN 978-1474402255.
