= Tandu Khatun =

Principal Wife of the Jalayirid Sultanate
- Tenure: 1410 – 1411

Sovereign of the Jalayirid Sultanate
- Reign: 1411 – 1419
- Co-ruler: Mahmud (1411–1415); Uvais II (since 1415)
- Died: 1419
- Spouse: Barquq; Shah Walad Jalayir
- Issue: Uvais II
Regnal name
- Döndü Sultan
- House: Jalayirids
- Father: Shaikh Hussain Jalayir

Tandu Khatun (Turkish: Döndü Hatun) or Tindu Khatun (fl. 1393 – c. 1419) was a Jalayirid princess and sovereign of the Jalairid Sultanate in Iraq in 1411–1419.

== Background ==
Her parentage is uncertain. According to Abd al-Razzaq Samarqandi, she was the daughter of Shaikh Awais Jalayir of the Jalairid Sultanate in Iraq. Another author, Shabankara'i, presented her as the daughter of Hasan Bozorg and Dilshad Khatun. While most of the Medieval authors such as Al-Maqrizi and Ibn al-Imad al-Hanbali, as well as modern authors like Eduard von Zambaur (1866-1947), Mehmet Zihni (1845-1913) and Bahriye Üçok believed her to be the daughter of Shaikh Hussain Jalayir.

== Marriages ==
=== Barquq ===
According to Shabankara'i, she was first married to Sayf ad-Din Barquq of the Egyptian Mamluk Sultanate in 1393. The marriage was arranged by his uncle Ahmad Jalayir as an alliance between Iraq and Egypt against Timur. The marriage was arranged during a journey she made with her uncle to Cairo, when Barquq was allegedly astonished by her beauty and asked for her hand, and when her uncle returned to Iraq, she remained, while Egypt sent support of the Egyptian armies to assist Iraq against Timur. The marriage was reportedly happy from Barquq's point of view, as he was said to have loved her greatly. Tandu, however, did not like life in Egypt and suffered from homesickness, and eventually, Barquq allowed her to return to Iraq.

=== Shah Walad ===
In Iraq, she eventually married her cousin, Shah Walad Jalayir, heir of Ahmad. However, Ahmad was killed by Qara Yusuf in 1410, who sent his son Shah Muhammad to capture Baghdad, where Shah Walad recently rose to the throne.

== Rule ==
Bakhshāyesh, the military governor of Baghdad, soon offered Tandu to her daughter to marry her. Bakhshāyesh recently rose in power after killing rival emirs in Baghdad. However, he was killed on his wedding night. According Tarikh al-Ghiyathi, it was Tandu who ordered the murder. Tandu then started a rumor that his uncle Ahmad was actually 'hidden' and would come back to save his people soon, ordering Baghdad people to celebrate for 3 days. While using opportunity, she fled the city with Walad's 6 children and went to Wasit and then Shushtar. Strengthening in Shushtar, Basra and Wasit, Tandu reportedly took power herself as ruler, and remained in power for eight years with Mahmud (r. 1411–1415) and Uvais II (r. 1415–1421). Nevertheless, Jalayirid power was not secure, thus she submitted to Shahrukh to keep Khuzistan in control. Hanbali relates that "The khutba was said in her name from the pulpits and money was coined in her name until her death in 822 AH (1419/1420 CE). Her son took power after her." According to Fatema Mernissi, Tindu was one of Muslim female rulers who met the Muslim criteria of sovereignty.

== Sources ==
- Üçok, Bahriye (1965). İslam Devletlerinde Kadın Hükümdarlar (in Turkish). Ankara: Bilge Kultur Sanat.
