= Ahmad Musa (painter) =

Persian painter (14th century)

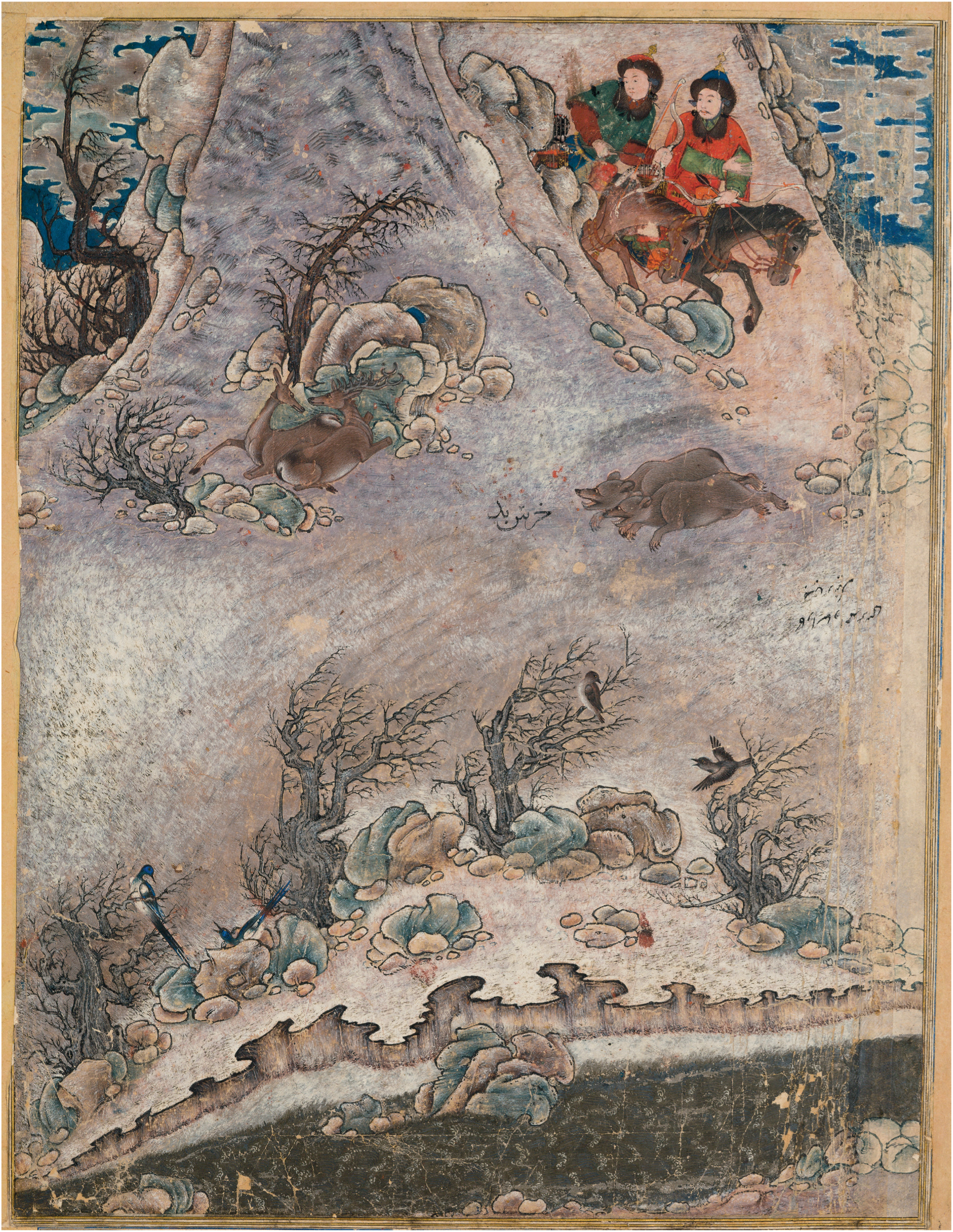
Two Riders in a Wintry Landscape with Bears, polychrome painting, attr. Ahmad Musa by an inscription, Tabriz or Baghdad, mid-14th century. Folio, TSMK, H. 2153, fol. 28r

Ahmad Musa (Persian: احمد موسی) was a painter of the 14th century in Ilkhanid Iran. He is said to have invented naturalistic Persianate painting, at the time the last Mongol Ilkhanid ruler, Abu Sa'id (r. 1317–35) was ruling. He may still have been active under the Jalayirid Sultanate of Shaykh Uways Jalayir, ca. 1370–74.

Ahmad Musa reportedly accomplished this artistic feat by “lifting the veil from the face of depiction.”

Dust Muhammad made the following comment about the work of Ahmad Musa, while acknowledging the advances made in China and Europe:

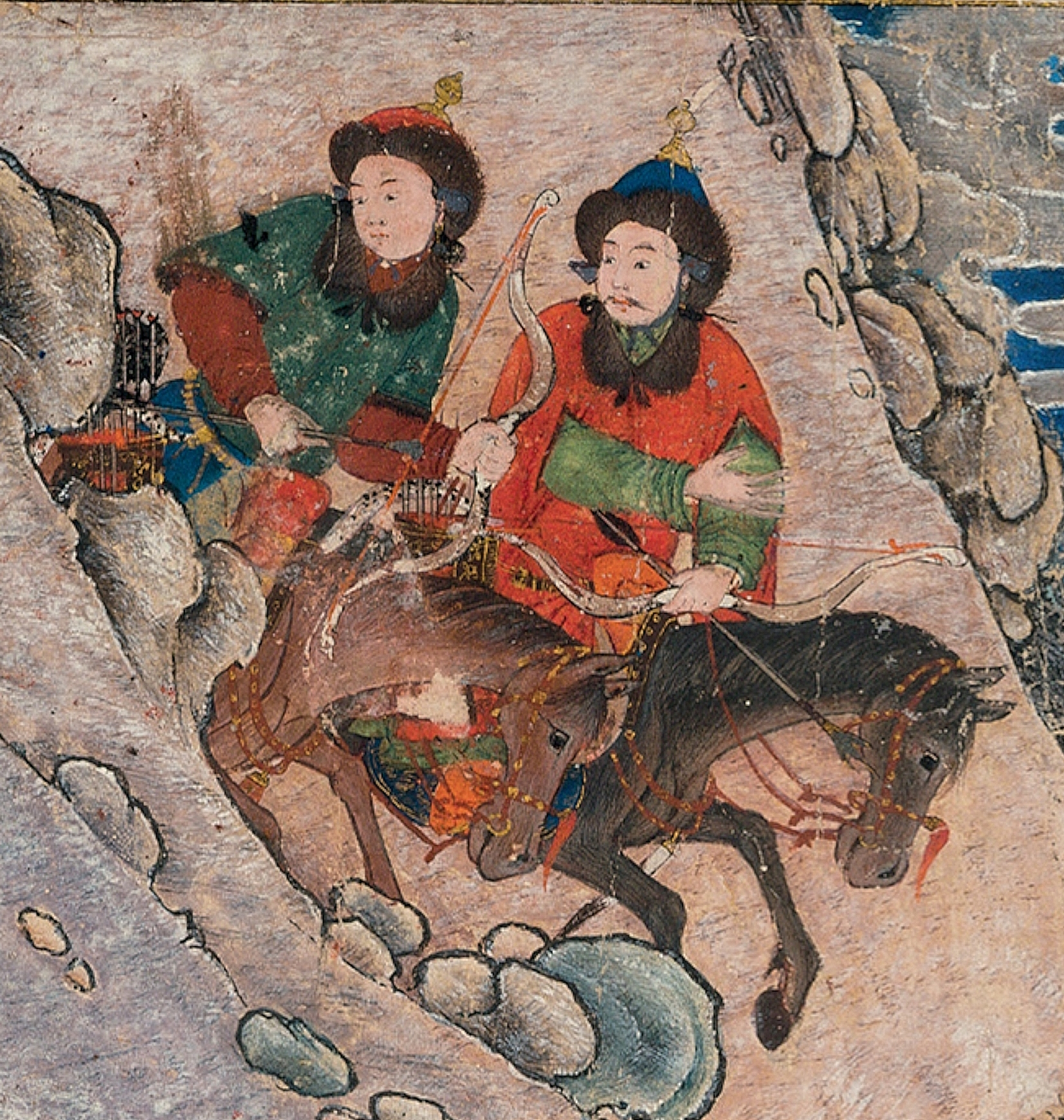
Two Riders in a Wintry Landscape with Bears, polychrome painting, attr. Ahmad Musa by an inscription, Tabriz or Baghdad, mid-14th century. Folio, TSMK, H. 2153, fol. 28r (detail)

The custom of portraiture flourished in the lands of Cathay and the Franks until sharp-penned Mercury scrivened the rescript of rule in the name of Sultan Abusaʿid Khudaybanda (Note: Khudābanda, meaning “servant of God”. It is most strongly associated with his father Öljaitü, whose Islamic regnal name included Muhammad Khudābanda). Master Ahmad Musa, who was his father’s pupil, lifted the veil from the face of depiction, and the [style of] depiction that is now current was invented by him. Among the scenes by him that lighted on the page of the world in the reign of the aforementioned emperor, an Abusaʿidnama, a Kalila u Dimna, a Miʿrajnama calligraphed by Mawlana Abdullah Sayrafi, and a Tarikh-i Chingizi in beautiful script by an unknown hand were in the library of the late emperor Sultan-Husayn Mirza.

— Dust Muhammad, preface to the Bahram Mirza Album

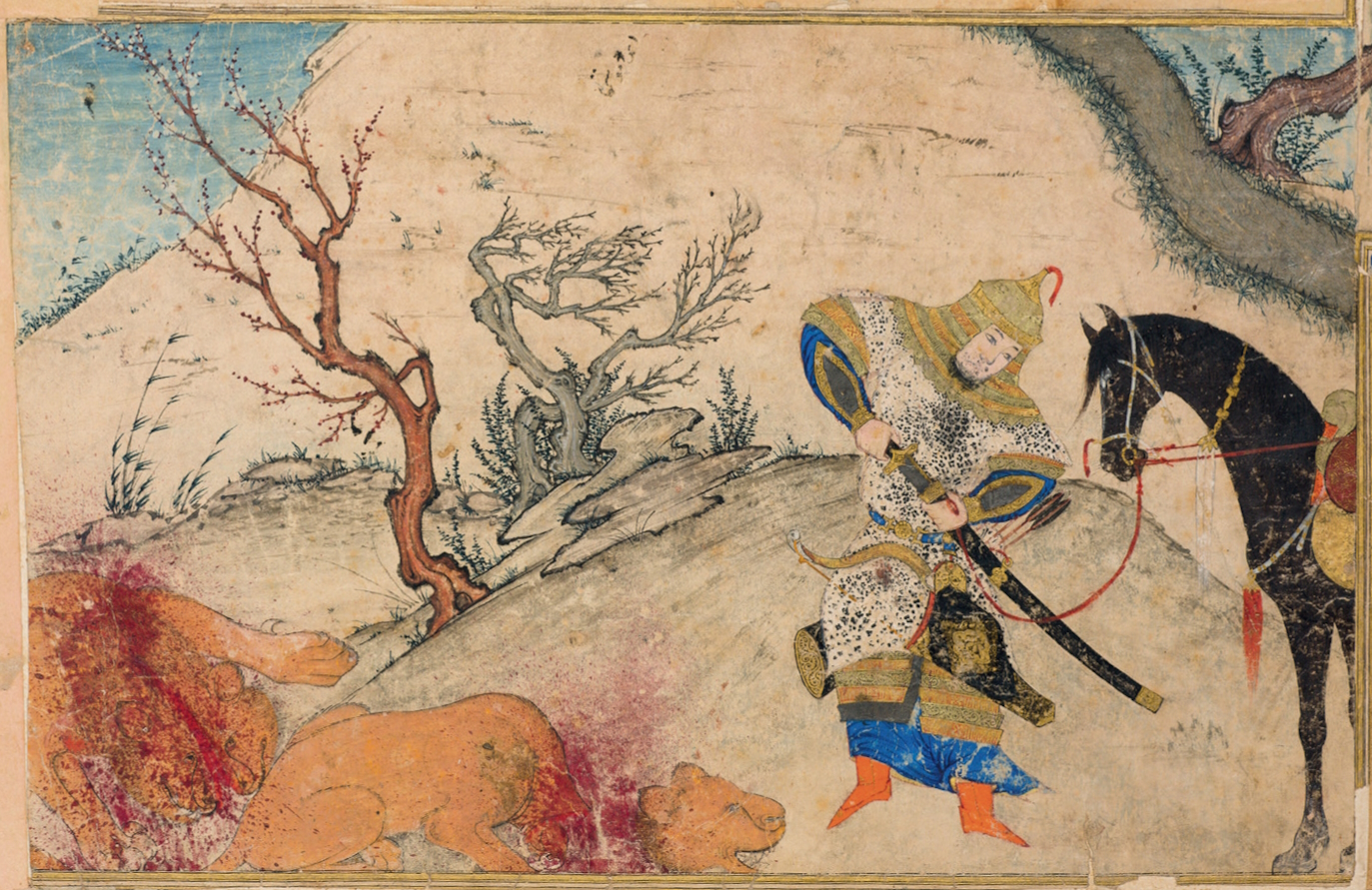
Isfandiyar’s Haft Khvān (Seven Labors), Jalayirid Shāhnāma, attr. Ahmad Musa by an inscription, Tabriz or Baghdad, ca. 1370–74. Folio, TSMK, H. 2153, fol. 16v

Some paintings attributed to Ahmad Musa are mounted in the Shah Tahmasp Album at the Istanbul University Library (F. 1422). The Miʿrājnāma paintings by Ahmad Musa can be seen in the Bahram Mirza Album (H. 2154).
