= Uvais II =

Sultan Awais Jalayir (also written as Uvais or Uways or Oways) was a Jalayirid ruler of Basra, in southern Iraq (r. 1415–1421), with his rule ending in 1421 with his death. He was the son of Shah Walad Jalayir. In 1415, Sultan Awais Jalayir succeeded his brother Sultan Mahmud Jalayir as Jalayirid ruler. During his reign, he conducted two campaigns against the Black Sheep Turkmen in an attempt to recover Baghdad for the Jalayirids. While conducting the second campaign he was killed in battle. He was succeeded by another brother, Sultan Muhammad Jalayir.

== See also ==
- Jalairid Sultanate

Preceded by Sultan Mahmud Jalayir	Jalayirid Ruler; 1415–1421	Succeeded by Sultan Muhammad Jalayir
