= Siege of Baghdad (1393) =

Siege between Timur and Jalayir

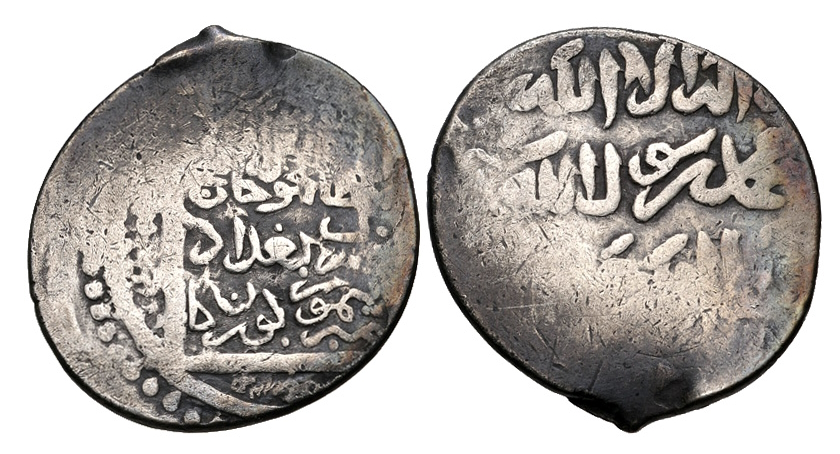
Rare coinage of Timur while in Jalayirid Baghdad, following the Siege of Baghdad in 1393. Citing Chagatai khan Mahmud.

The Siege of Baghdad (1393) (Arabic: حِصَارُ بَغْدَاد, romanized: Ḥiṣāru Baghdād)marked the capture of the Jalayirid Sultanate capital Baghdad by the Timurids in 1393. The ruler of the Jalayirids, Ahmad Jalayir, fled to the Mamluk capital. The death and destruction was more severe when Timur attacked the city again in 1401.

The siege of Baghdad immediately followed the Battle of Shiraz (1393), in which the Timurids defeated Shah Mansur and put an end to the Muzaffarids in southwestern Iran. With the fall of the Muzaffarids, potential opposition on his southwestern flank being resolved, Timur then continued with the conquest of Jalayirid Baghdad in 1393, forcing Sultan Ahmad Jalayir to flee. Timur massacred part of the population and ordered the pillage of the city. Heavy taxes were imposed on the rest of the population.

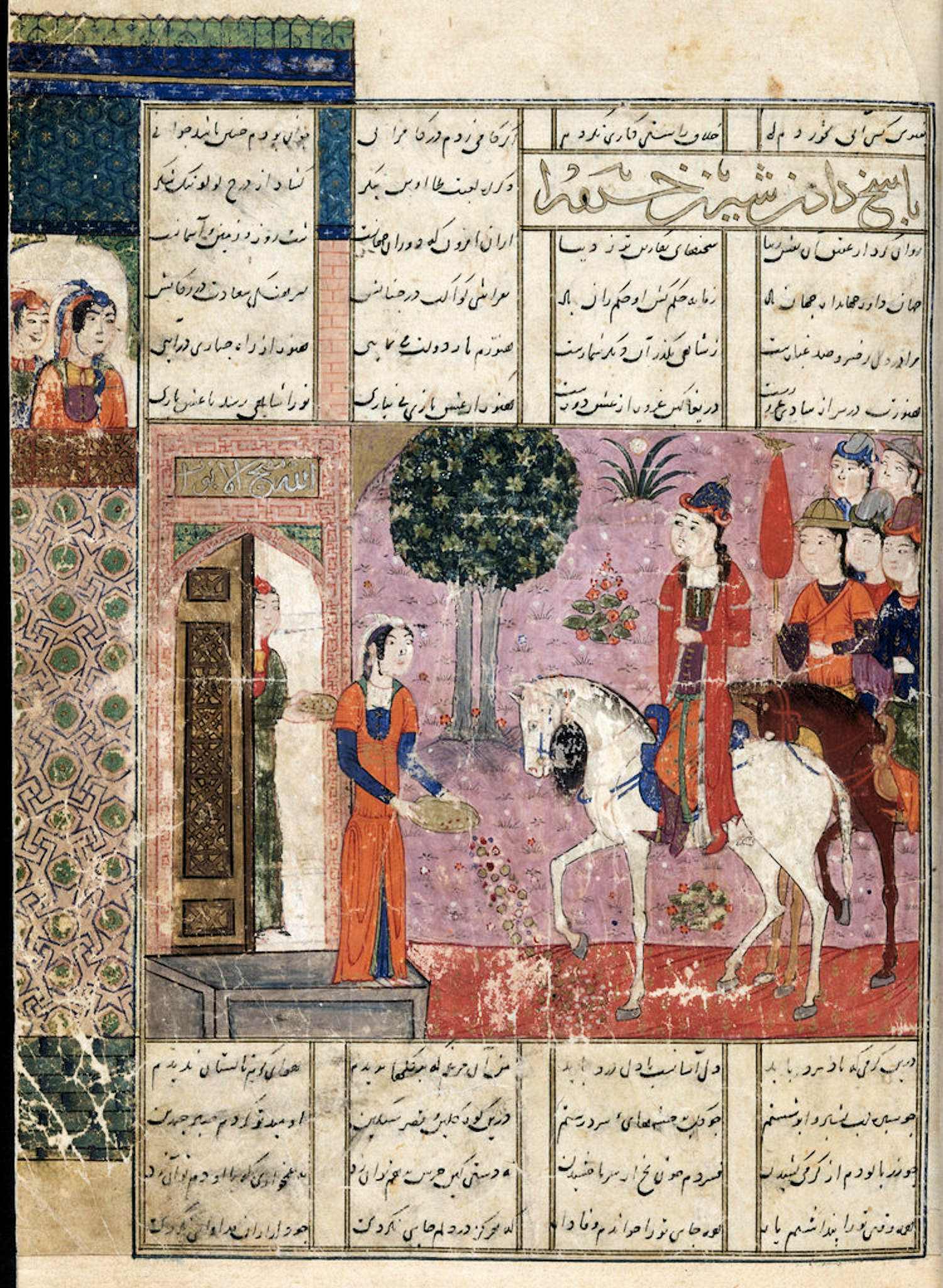
Khusraw arriving at Shirin's castle. Jalayirid Khamsa of Nizami, 1386-88, Baghdad

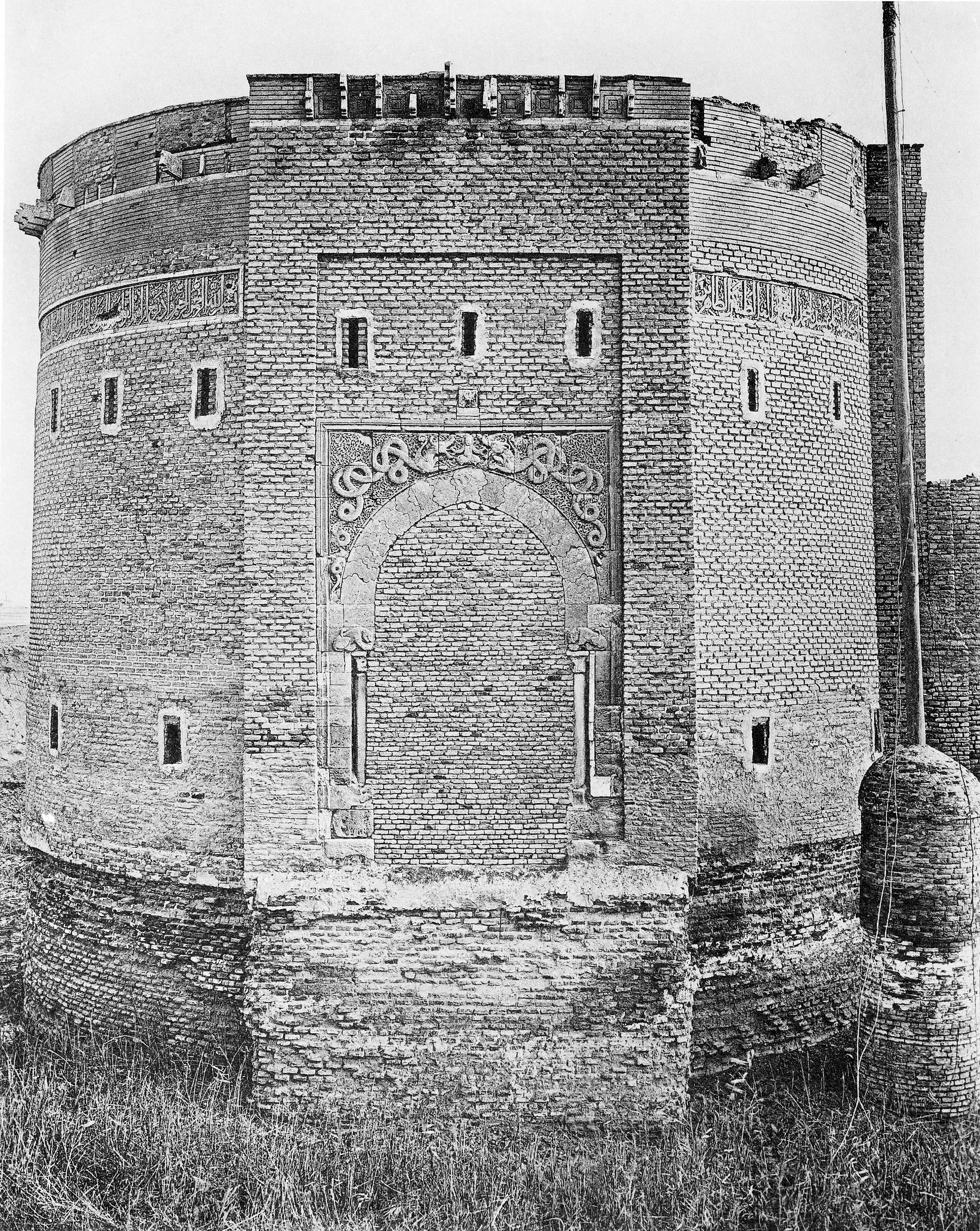
The Talisman Gate, built in 1220–1221 by al-Nasir, protected the eastern walls of Baghdad

Timur also deported many scholars and artists such as “the masters of the renowned Baghdad school of book illumination, who had enjoyed the protection of Sulṭān Aḥmad". Following the siege, Timur captured Ahamd Jalayir's son Ala-al-Dawla and numerous artists and scholars whom he brought to Samarkand. Dust Muhammad, the Safavid calligrapher and historian, reports that Timur captured the Jalayirid miniature artist Khwaja Abdul-Hayy from Baghdad to bring him back to the Timurid court in Samarkand, where his style was then followed by local court artists:

When the realm-conquering banners of Timur Kiiragan cast the ray of the caliphate in subjugating the realm of Baghdad, and he made that Abode of Peace the residence of the caliphal throne for a few days, Khwaja Abdul-Hayy was taken along with the celestial army to the Abode of the Sultanate Samarqand, where he died. After the Khwaja's death all masters imitated his works.

— Dust Muhammad, preface to Bahram Mirza Album (1544).

Timur finally left after two months, going on to conquer Tikrit. Following the siege, Timur established as governor of Baghdad Ḵwāja Masʿud Sabzavāri, a rather benevolent Sarbadāri prince. Timur then completed the conquest of western Persia, Armenia and Azerbaijan in 1393-1394, also subjugating Georgia in 1394.

The Jalayirid ruler Ahmad Jalayir first went to Damascus, and later to Cairo, where he was received by the Mamluk sultan Barquq. The Mamluks were rivals of Timur, so offering Ahmad Jalayir protection was politically useful in opposing Timurid expansion. The Mamluk army accompanied Ahmad Jalayir back to his lands, leading to the successful capture of Baghdad (1394).

Timur would come back again with the Siege of Baghdad (1401).

== Sources ==
- Jackson, Peter; Lockhart, Laurence, eds. (1986). The Cambridge History of Iran, Volume 6: The Timurid and Safavid periods. Cambridge University Press. ISBN 0521200946.
