= Miraj Nameh =

15th-century Islamic manuscript

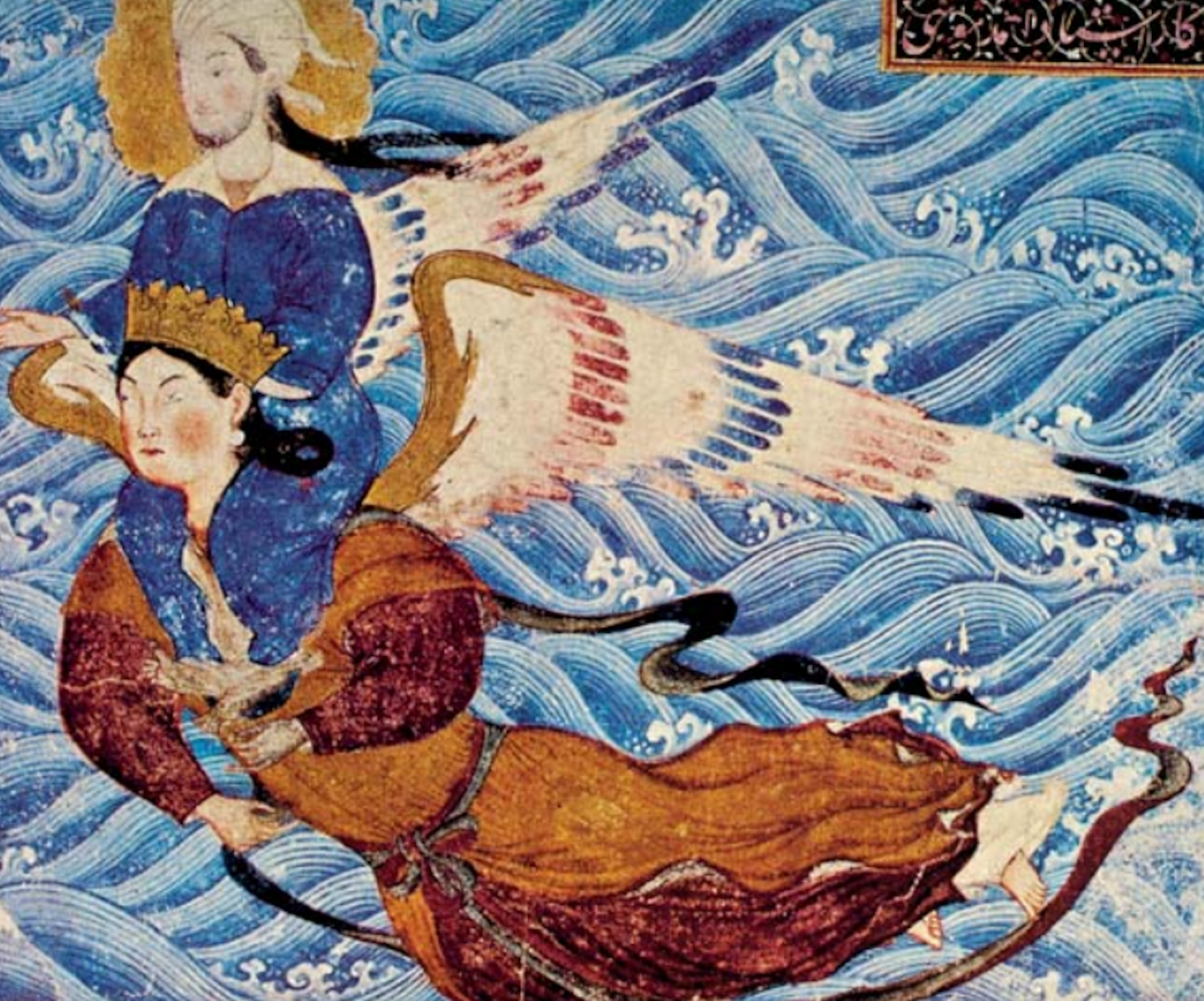
The flight of the Prophet over the lake Kovsar. Miraj-nama (Topkapi, H.2154), 1360-1370, Tabriz.

The Miraj Nameh or Miraj Namah (Persian: معراج نامه, romanized: Writ of [Muhammad's] ascension to Heaven) is an ancient Persian manuscript describing the supernatural journey of the Islamic prophet Muhammad through the heavens. Several copies are known.

== Il-khanid early images (1306-16) ==
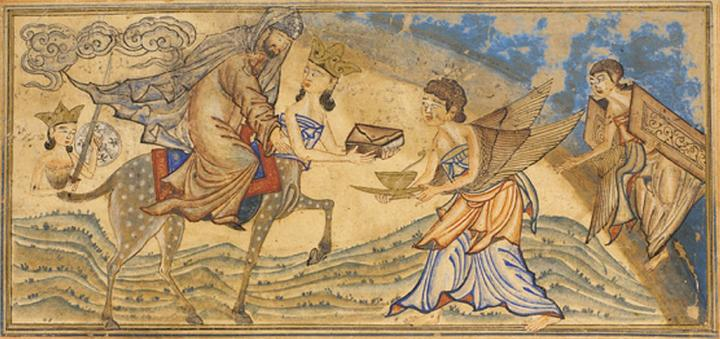
Muhammad during the Mi'raj. Jami al-Tawarikh, 1306-16.

The earliest known images of the ascension of Muhammad appear in Rashid-al-Din's Jami al-tawarik ("Compendium of Chronicles"), created in Tabriz from 1306-7 under the reign of Ghazan (r. 1295-1304), until the reign of his successor Öljeitü (r. 1304-16) Muhammad appears striding his human-headed flying steed al-Borāq, symbolizing the choice of the correct path between good and evil.

== Jalayirid manuscript, TSMK, H. 2154 (1370–74) ==
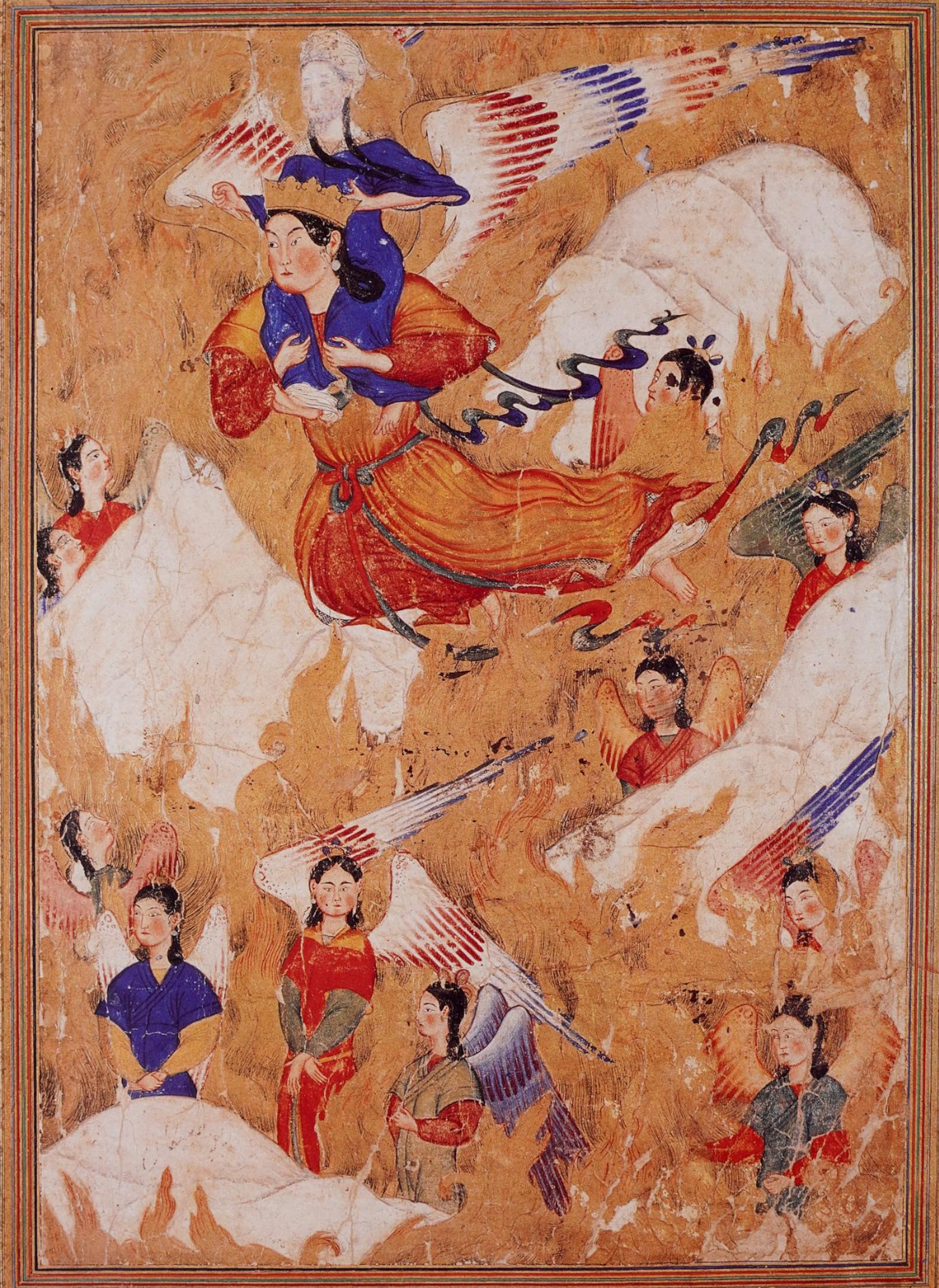
Muhammad and the Angel Gabriel, Miraj-nama (1360-70) by Ahmad Musa, Tabriz

The first known illustrated manuscript of the Miraj Nameh is the TSMK Miraj Nameh, created in the ateliers of the Jalayirid Sultanate in Tabriz, during the rule of Shaykh Uways Jalayir. Alternatively, this manuscript is sometimes attributed to the commission of the last Il-khanid ruler Abu Saʿid Bahādor Khan (r. 1316-35), but should likely be dated later due to the absence of equivalent styles under the Il-khanate.

The miniatures were later incorporated into Topkapi Palace Library (Hazine 2154). The miniatures may have been created by the famed Ahmad Musa, who name appears on some labels of the Bahram Mirza album added during the Safavid era.

The creation of Miraj Nameh by Ahmad Musa was reported by the court calligrapher Dust Muhammad in his 1544 introduction to the Bahram Mirza Album:

The custom of portraiture flourished in the lands of Cathay and the Franks until sharp-penned Mercury scrivened the rescript of rule in the name of Sultan Abusaʿid Khudaybanda. Master Ahmad Musa, who was his father’s pupil, lifted the veil from the face of depiction, and the [style of] depiction that is now current was invented by him. Among the scenes by him that lighted on the page of the world in the reign of the aforementioned emperor, an Abusaʿidnama, a Kalila u Dimna, a Miʿrajnama calligraphed by Mawlana Abdullah Sayrafi, and a Tarikh-i Chingizi in beautiful script by an unknown hand were in the library of the late emperor Sultan-Husayn Mirza

— Preface to the Bahram Mirza Album (extract), by Dust Muhammad (1544)..

== Timurid manuscript, Supplément turc 190 (1436-37) ==
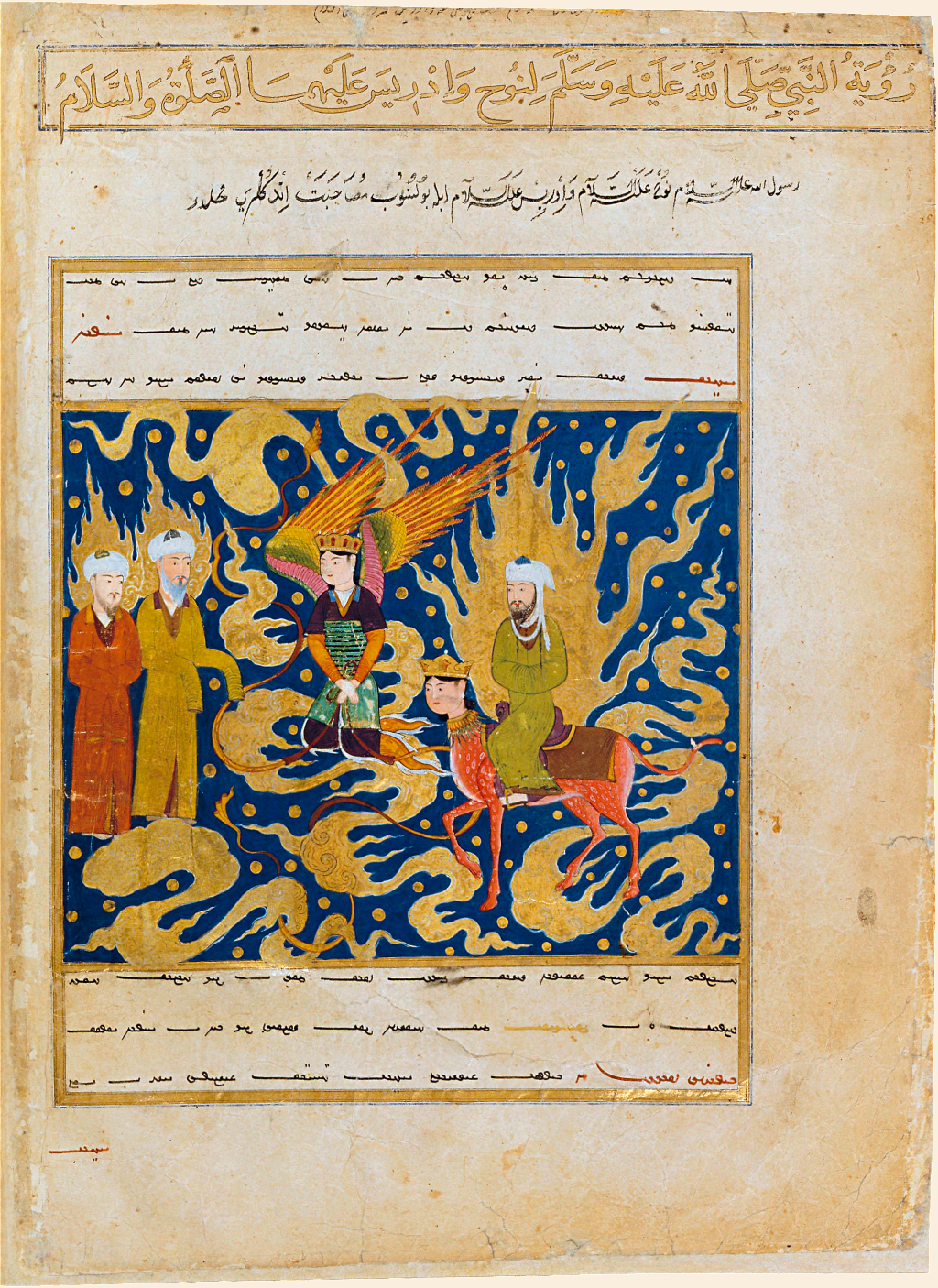
Night Journey (Mi'raj) of Muhammad on the Buraq with the archangel Gabriel and two prophets, Noah and Idris

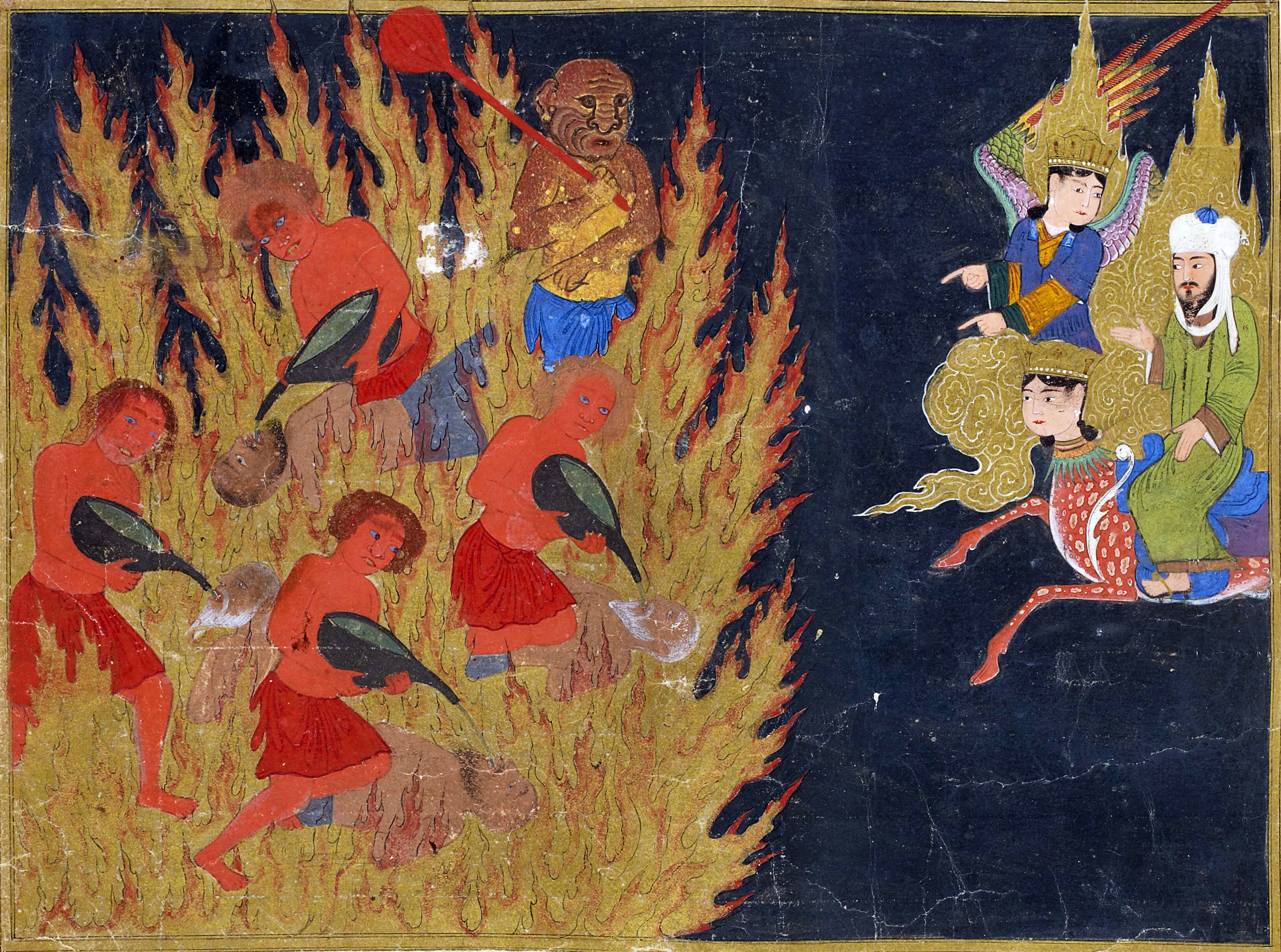
Miniature of Muhammad with Gabriel visiting Hell from the manuscript

The version of the Miraj Nameh in the National Library of France, "supplément turc 190" is an Islamic manuscript created in the fifteenth century, in the workshops of Herat in Khorasan (modern Iran and Afghanistan), at the request of Shahrukh Mirza, son of Timur. The text is written in Eastern Turkic language and was composed between 1436 and 1437 (840 in the Islamic calendar).

The most important text is one of many redactions of the story of The Miraculous Journey of Mohammed, which tells of the Isra and Mi'raj or night journey, including the ascension of Muhammad to heaven. The text was composed by the poet Mir Haydar in Eastern Turkic, with calligraphy by Malik Bakhshi of Herat in the Uighur script. The manuscript is illustrated with sixty-one Persian miniatures; like other Mi'raj manuscripts, these include depictions of Muhammad. The Mi'raj has been described as "one of the most extraordinary of all Islamic illustrated manuscripts".

=== Inspiration ===
The work is inspired by the first verse from Surah XVII of the Quran, "al-Isra":

"Glory to Him Who carried His servant by night from the Sacred Mosque to the Remote Mosque, whose precincts We blessed, that We might show him of Our signs! Surely He is the Hearing, the Seeing."

The journey appears as a climb during which the angel Gabriel leads Muhammad from Mecca to the Farthest Mosque in Jerusalem, and thence to the Seventh Heaven, where they received the founder of Islam in ecstatic contemplation of the divine essence. In the first centuries of the Hejira, this story led to the creation of other popular Arabic stories and then, after theological progress, mystics and literary, were gradually integrated into Muslim belief.

=== Provenance ===
The book was bought in 1673 in Constantinople by the famous translator of The Thousand and One Nights, Antoine Galland (1646-1715). It was taken to France, and was part of the library of Jean-Baptiste Colbert.

== Bibliography ==
- Nameh, Miraj: "The Miraculous Journey of Mahomet . Introduction and commentaries by Marie-Rose Séguy (1977) Ed Braziller (George) Inc., US ISBN 0-8076-0868-8
- Hillenbrand, Robert: Persian Painting: From the Mongols to the Qajars (Pembroke Persian Papers) Ed. IB Tauris (2001) ISBN 1-85043-659-2
