= Siege of Baghdad (1401) =

- Part of Timurid conquests and invasions
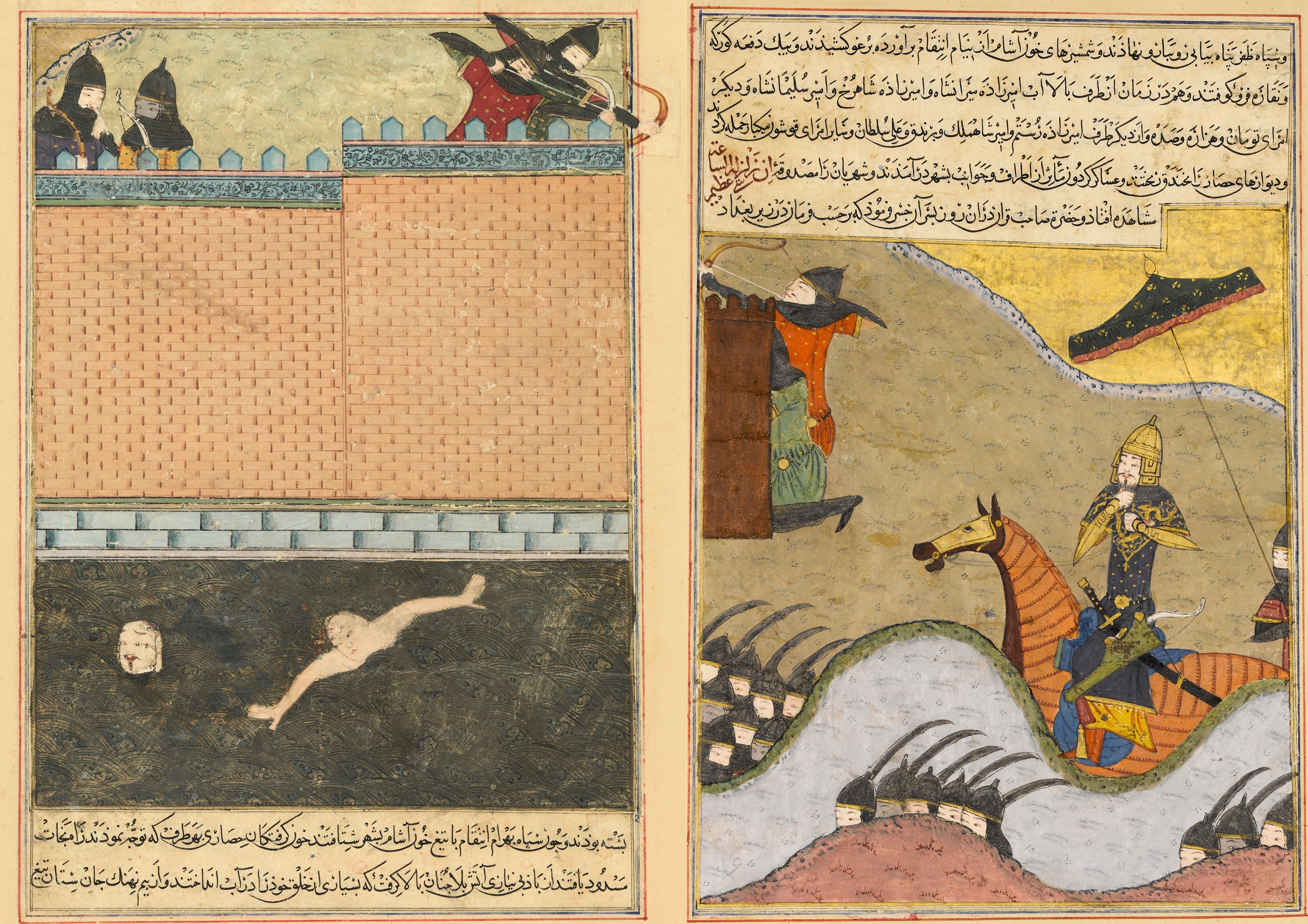
- Jalayirid troops (left, on top of the wall) defending Baghdad against Timur (right) in August 1401. Folio from a Dispersed copy of the Zafarnama (Book of Victory) of 1436
Date	1401 (40 days)
Location	Baghdad 33°20′51″N 44°20′06″E
Result	Timurid victory
Territorial changes	Timurid occupation of Baghdad (1401-1405)

Belligerents
Timurid Empire	Jalayirid Sultanate

Commanders and leaders
Timur	Sultan Ahmed Jalayir

In 1401, Timur, the ruler of the Timurid Empire, besieged the Jalayirid Sultanate capital of Baghdad for forty days and then massacred its inhabitants for resisting. The Turco-Mongol army looted the treasury and razed much of the city, except for mosques and madrasas. Contemporaries reported that each Mongol soldier was ordered to bring at least one severed head of an inhabitant. Only one out of a hundred of the city's inhabitants reportedly survived the massacre to be sold into slavery.

Dust Muhammad reports that following the siege Timur captured the Jalayirid miniature artist Khwaja Abdul-Hayy to bring him back to the Timurid court in Samarkand, where his style was then followed by local court artists:

When the realm-conquering banners of Timur Kiiragan cast the ray of the caliphate in subjugating the realm of Baghdad, and he made that Abode of Peace the residence of the caliphal throne for a few days, Khwaja Abdul-Hayy was taken along with the celestial army to the Abode of the Sultanate Samarqand, where he died. After the Khwaja's death all masters imitated his works.

— Dust Muhammad, preface to Bahram Mirza Album (1544).

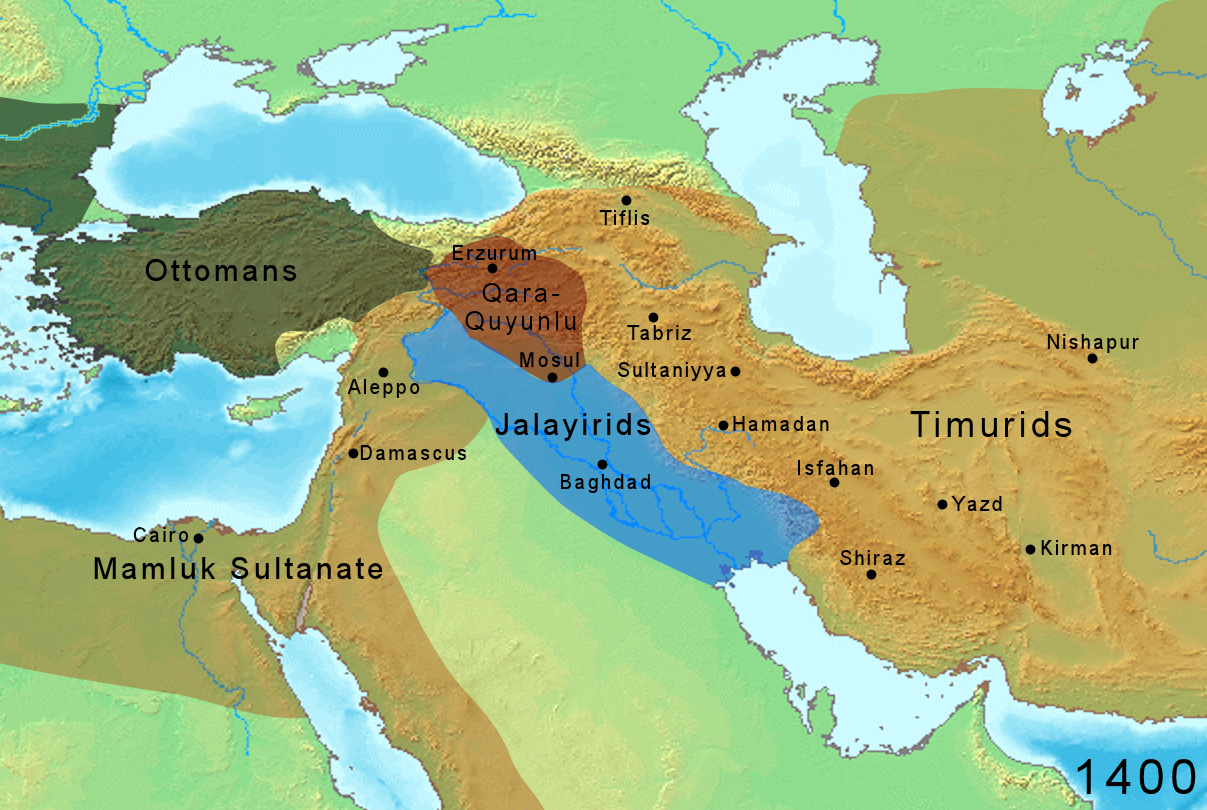
Jalayirid, Qara Qoyunlu and Timurid territories in 1400.

Sultan Ahmed Jalayir, the ruler of the Jalayirids, had to flee to Damascus, to the protection of the Ottoman sultan Bayezid I. He was accompanied by the Kara Koyunlu ruler Kara Yusuf. Sultan Ahmed Jalayir and Qara Yusuf were welcomed by Sheikh Mahmud, the nâib of Damascus. Not wanting to worsen relations with Amir Timur, Nasir-ad-Din Faraj agreed to capture Qara Yusuf and Sultan Ahmed Jalayir, and hand them over to Timur. Instead, Sultan Ahmad Jalayir and Qara Yusuf were imprisoned on the order of Nasir-ad-Din Faraj, the Mamluk Sultan of Egypt. Together in prison, the two leaders renewed their friendship, making an agreement that Sultan Ahmed Jalayir should keep Baghdad while Qara Yusuf would have Azerbaijan. Ahmad also adopted Qara Yusuf's son Pirbudag. The hosting of Kara Yusuf by Bayezid I was one of the main reasons Timur then launched a campaign against the Ottomans. Timur continued as he conquered Aleppo, Damascus and eastern Anatolia. In 1402 he defeated the Ottomans in the momentous Battle of Ankara, plunging the Ottoman Empire into a civil war.

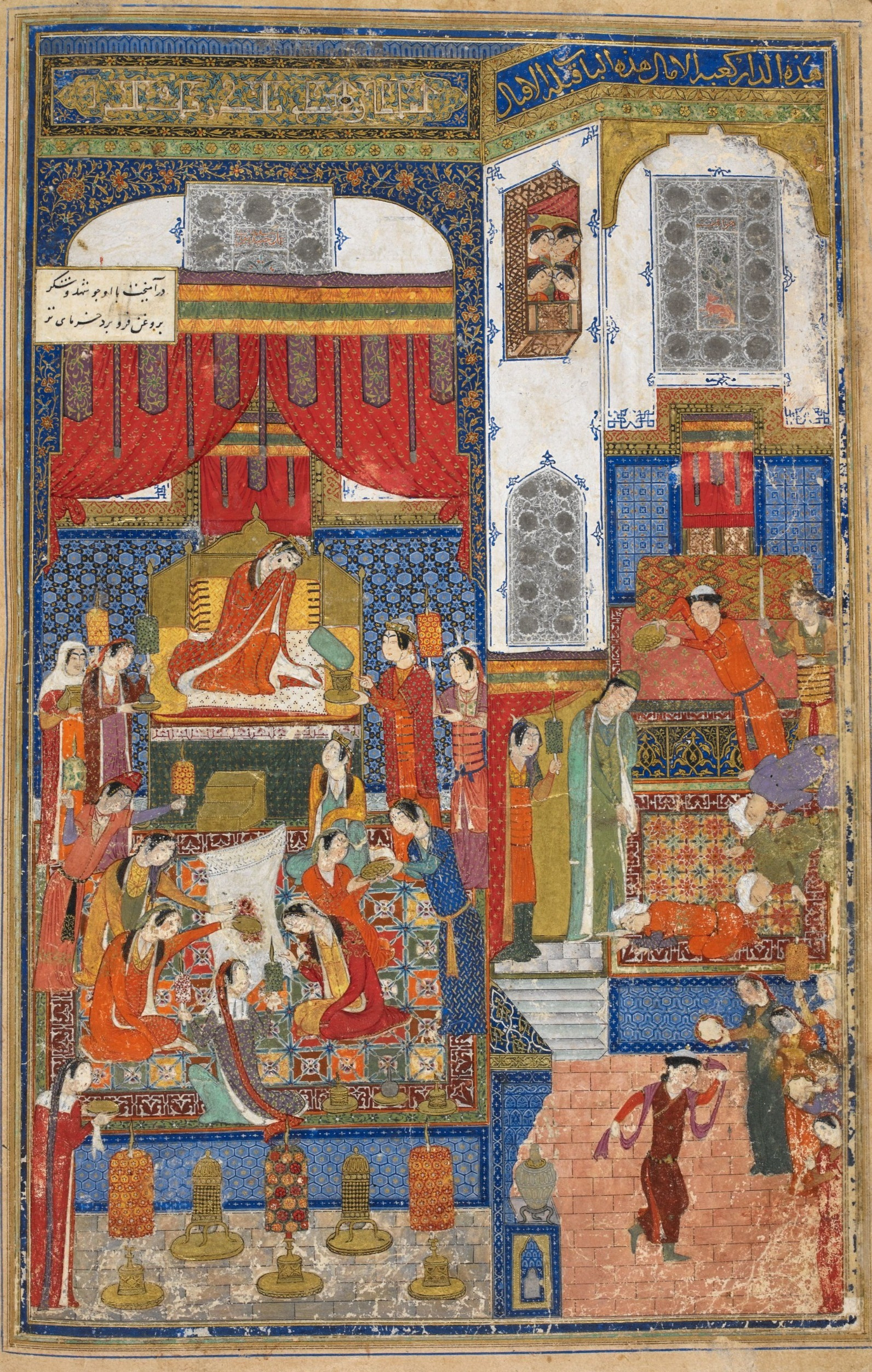
Jalayirid palatial scene in Baghdad in 1396. Khamsah by Khvaju Kirmani (1396, Baghdad). This is "the most firmly dated illustrated and high-quality Jalayirid manuscript".

When Timur died in 1405 Nasir-ad-Din Faraj released Sultan Ahmad Jalayir and Qara Yusuf from captivity in Damascus. However, according to Faruk Sümer, they were released on the orders of rebellious wali of Damascus – Sheykh Mahmud. Sultan Ahmad Jalayir, taking advantage of a local insurrection, finally managed to recapture the city of Baghdad with the help of Qara Yusuf leading his Qara Koyunlu troops. He eliminated the administration of Mirza Ömer, son of Miran Shah, who had been in charge of ruling the city for the Timurids.

Then, Qara Yusuf took control of Tabriz, where he settled his own government.
