= Baghdad Wall =

The Baghdad Wall is a 5 km-long (3.1 mi) wall which was built by the 2nd Brigade Combat Team, 82nd Airborne Division of the United States Army around the predominantly Sunni district of Adhamiya in Baghdad, Iraq. Construction of the 3.6 m-high (12 ft) concrete wall began on 10 April 2007.

Maj. Gen. William Caldwell, the senior spokesman for coalition forces in Iraq, was reportedly unaware of the construction of the Baghdad wall, saying on 18 April 2007, "We have no intent to build gated communities in Baghdad. Our goal is to unify Baghdad, not subdivide it into separate [enclaves]."

However, a news release on the same day from the Multi-National Corps-Iraq announced that "the wall [in Adhamiyah] is one of the centerpieces of a new strategy by coalition and Iraqi forces to break the cycle of sectarian violence. Planners hope the creation of the wall will help restore law and order by providing a way to screen people entering and exiting the neighborhood – allowing residents and people with legitimate business in, while keeping death squads and militia groups out."

Dawood al-Azami, acting head of the Adhamiya council, said on 21 April that construction of the wall had begun before the council had approved the American proposal: "A few days ago, we met with the U.S. army unit in charge of Adhamiya and it asked us, as a local council, to sign a document to build a wall to reduce killing and attacks against Iraqi and U.S. forces. I told the soldiers that I would not sign it unless I could talk to residents first. We told residents at Friday prayers, but our local council hasn't signed onto the project yet, and construction is already under way."

On 22 April, Prime Minister Nouri al-Maliki called for the building work to cease. Subsequently, on 23 April, an estimated 7,000 Iraqis engaged in a peaceful demonstration against the wall, several carrying banners reading (in English) "No to the sectarian barrier."

Following the demonstration, the U.S. military issued a statement that "the construction of the wall is under review" and that they would "coordinate with the Iraq government to establish effective appropriate security measures." However, at a news conference later on the same day, spokesmen for the U.S. and Iraqi military stated that they had no plans to stop building temporary separation barriers, with Brigadier General Qassim Atta describing the media reports that the Iraqi Prime Minister was protesting about as "groundless."

At the news conference, Brigadier General Atta said: "The prime minister is in agreement with the work of the security forces and the issue of security barriers. We will continue to set up these barriers in Adhamiya and other areas." According to Atta, the barriers – which were to consist, he said, of sand barriers, trenches, barbed wire and concrete barriers constructed from moveable sections each weighing 6.3 tonnes (6.9 short tons) – would be only a temporary measure, to secure specific areas of Baghdad, and would be moved once each area was considered secure.

One wall was dismantled in Baghdad in September 2008. In June 2009, the Iraqi government announced it would begin dismantling the remaining walls in Baghdad.
