= Abd al-Hayy =

14th-century Persian artist

ʿAbd al-Ḥayy
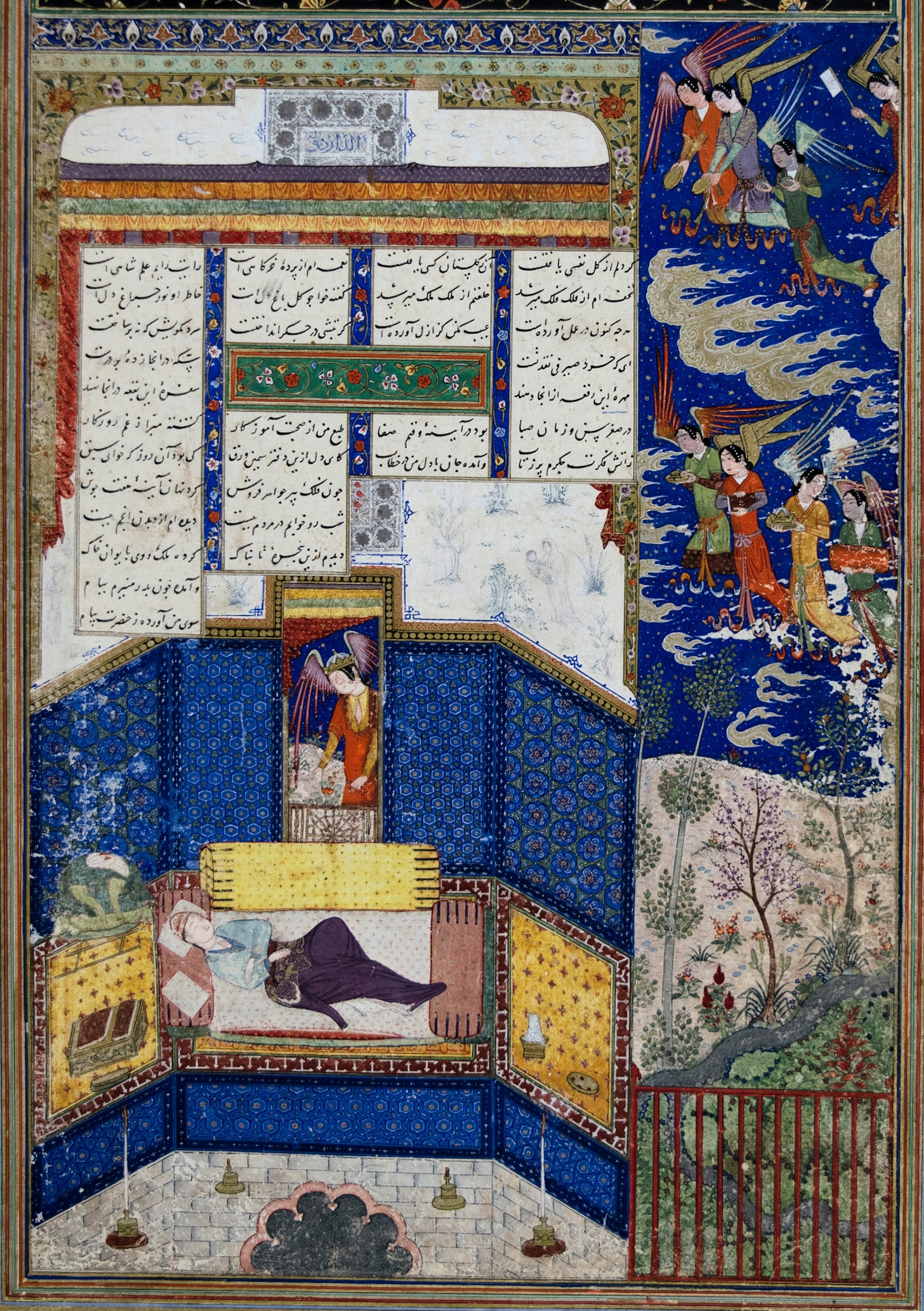
- A Poet’s Dream, detached from a Khamsa of Khvaju Kirmani (1396), Baghdad. Attributed to Abd al-Hayy by a Safavid note at the top of the page.
- Born: 1374
- Died: 1405 (aged 30–31)
- Known for: Miniature art, wall paintings

ʿAbd al-Ḥayy (Persian: عبدالحی; 1374 – 1405, Samarkand) was a Persian illustrator of the Jalayirid dynasty, specializing in discreet, miniature art. His career spanned from the late 14th century through the early 15th century. He is most commonly recognized for his wall paintings that decorated many ornate palaces, including the palaces of the Timurid Empire and his monochromatic ink paintings.

== Early life and relationships ==
=== Early life ===
`Abd al-Hayy began his career by training under Shams al-Din, another artist that was well regarded for his art. Shams al-Din most notably worked on The Court of the Jalāyir Sultans of Baghdad. `Abd al-Hayy's training took place primarily during the reign of the Jalayirid Shaikh Awais Jalayir, where he soon became a highly regarded and coveted painter due to skill and unique artistry.

=== Relationships ===
`Abd al-Hayy is commonly associated with Jalayerid Ovays, another notable miniature artist. Ovays is most often regarded as ʿAbd al-Ḥayy's most prominent mentor during his early career.

ʿAbd al-Ḥayy also is often affiliated with Ostāḏ Šams al-dīn, Ovays’s chief painter. Their professional relationship is theorized to have begun during Ovays's reign. During this period, Šams al-dīn spent much of his time and energy instructing ʿAbd al-Ḥayy, where he subsequently became the teacher of Aḥmad b. Ovays. Many suggest that Šams al-dīn’s instruction can be attributed to ʿAbd al-Ḥayy's remarkable success.

=== Exile ===
In Baghdad in 1401 (or, less likely, already earlier in 1393), Dust Muhammad reports that Timur captured the Jalayirid miniature artist Khwaja Abdul-Hayy to bring him back to the Timurid court in Samarkand, where his style was then followed by local court artists.

When the realm-conquering banners of Timur Kiiragan cast the ray of the caliphate in subjugating the realm of Baghdad, and he made that Abode of Peace the residence of the caliphal throne for a few days, Khwaja Abdul-Hayy was taken along with the celestial army to the Abode of the Sultanate Samarqand, where he died. After the Khwaja's death all masters imitated his works.

— Dust Muhammad, preface to Bahram Mirza Album

== Style ==
=== Preferences ===
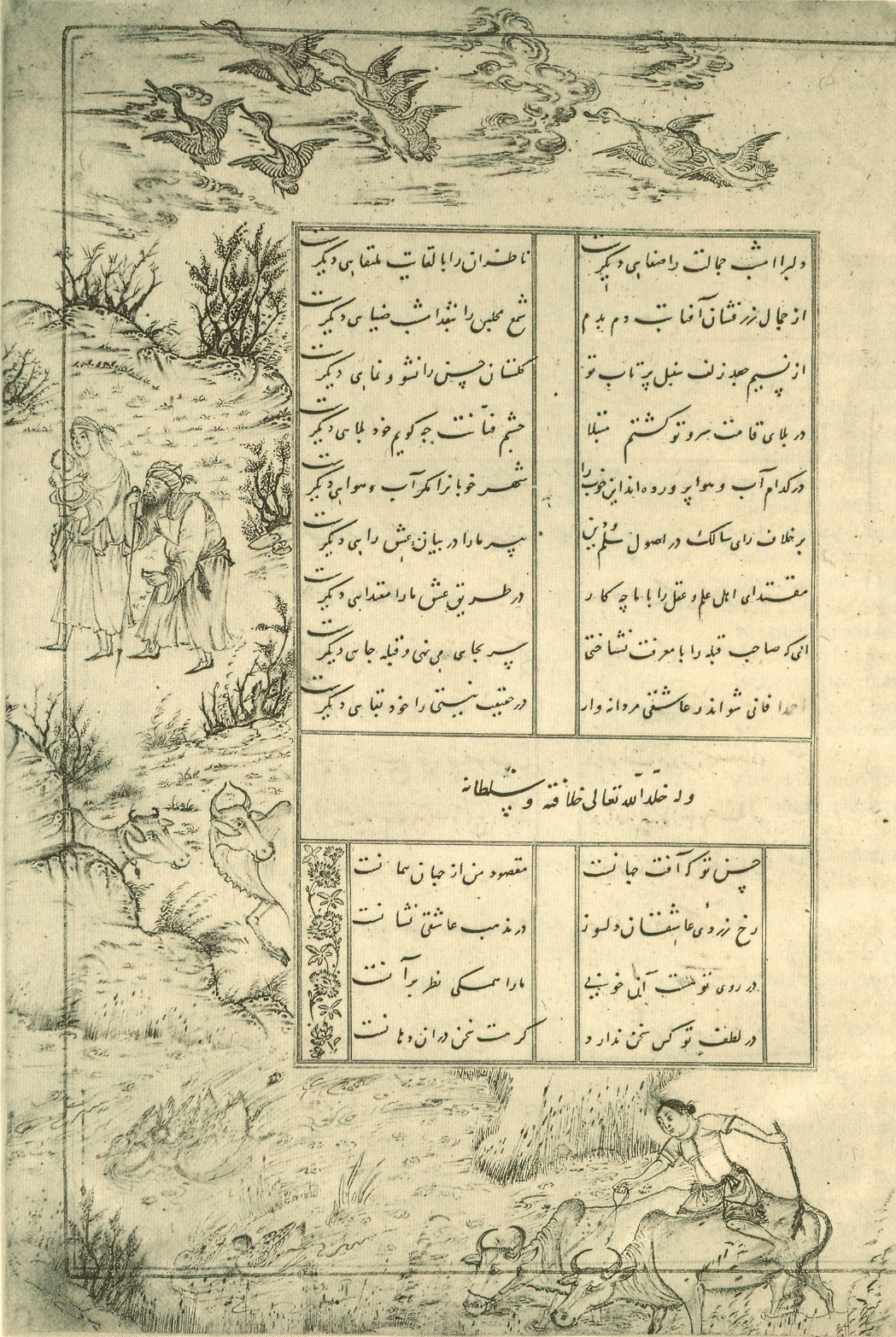
Page from the "Divan" Ahmada Džalaira by 'Abd al-Hayy, Freer Gallery of Art, 1406–10

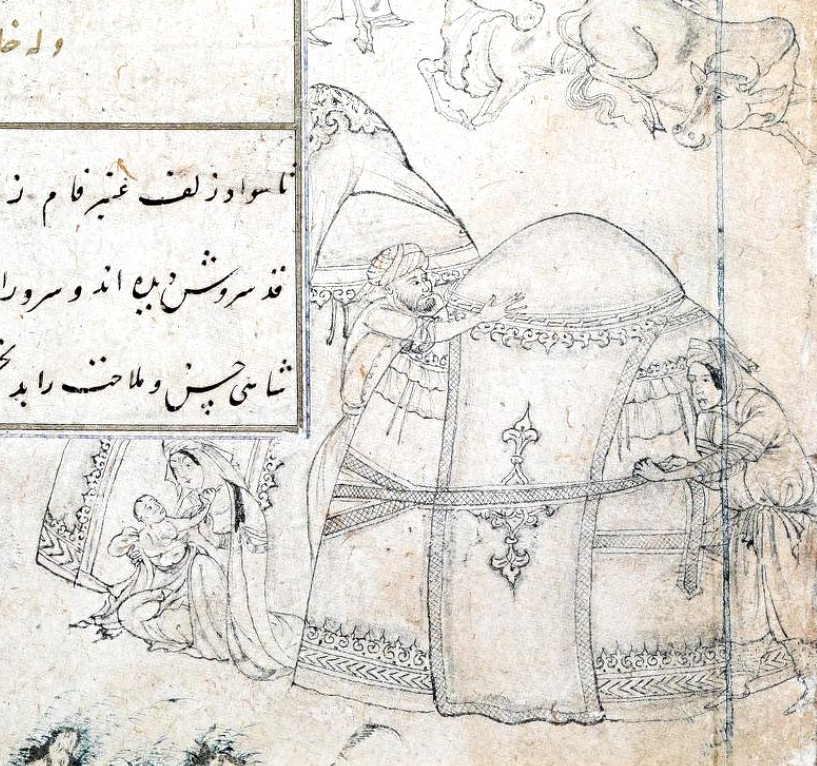
Drawing of pastoral scene with yurts, possibly made by Sultan Ahmad Jalayir himself or his teacher Abd al-Hayy. Divan by Sultan Ahmad Jalayir 1400–1403, Baghdad.

`Abd al-Hayy is theorized to have specialized in monochrome ink drawings. More specifically, he often created "black and white brush drawings, embellished with gold highlights and delicate tints."

`Abd al-Hayy also is recognized for his skilled work on the wall paintings at the Timurid palace. While most wall paintings of similar time period and intent depict landscapes and battles, very few depict living figures. `Abd al-Hayy's work contrasts this and his artistic subjects stray from the trends of the 14th century. Of the surviving paintings we can attribute to him, we can see his particular interest in drawing animals, such as ducks and lions.

=== Evidence ===
While the evidence to support theories of `Abd al-Hayy's specializations is minimal, the specialization of ink drawings would match the popular miniaturist styles of the late 14th and early 15th centuries. It has been theorized that ʿAbd al-Ḥayy’s monochrome ink style influenced the styles and trends of wall paintings because much of his work is represented monochromatically.

ʿAbd al-Ḥayy’s also has non monochromatic work attributed to him, directly defying evidence towards his monochromatic specializations. In one particular art piece, a portrait of a sleeping prince is executed in full color and in a style that is more akin to Jonayd Baḡdādī, another popular miniaturist during that time period. The contradiction between this painting’s style and that attributed to ʿAbd al-Ḥayy has not yet been resolved. One potential conclusion is that the name "`Abd al-Hayy" was not uncommon in 15th and 16th century. Due to this, it is impossible that "`Abd al-Hayy" is a conflation of a multitude of artistic figures.

The most significant wall painting that decorated the Timurid Palace and is attributed to Abd al-Hayy is of a woman and child. It is commonly credited to `Abd al-Hayy because of its striking similarity to his marginal drawings in a copy of Ahmad Jalayir's Divan.

=== Influence ===
`Abd al-Hayy's artistry and unique style went on to influence artists. For example, `Abd al-Hayy's pupil, the Jalayirid ruler Ahmad Jalayir, contributed a black and white drawing to a manuscript of the Abūsa῾īdnāma (“Book of Abu Sa῾id”) at the direct influence of `Abd al-Hayy. In addition, a number of folios that are attributed to the late 14th century and preserved in various albums bear the notation that they were copied from ῾Abd al-Hayy's drawings by Muhammad ibn Mahmud Shah Khayyam.

Another of `Abd al-Hayy's pupils, Ahmad Jalayir created similar monochromatic, black and white drawings to accompany his manuscripts in the Abusa'idnama ('Book of Abu Sa'id'). While texts from the time period do not directly confirm `Abd al-Hayy's involvement nor influence over these manuscripts, many scholars have concluded with firm certainty that these illustrations were done by `Abd al-Hayy. Evidence for this can be seen in the text of the manuscript that states that the unnamed painter, who was assisted by Aḥmad b. Ovays, prepared an Abū Saʿīd-nāma containing black and white drawings, a signature of `Abd al-Hayy. There are also a number of paintings that explicitly state that they were copied from `Abd al-Hayy's drawings, some of which can be dated back to the late 14th century.
