= Dust Muhammad Haravi =

Persian calligrapher (16th century)

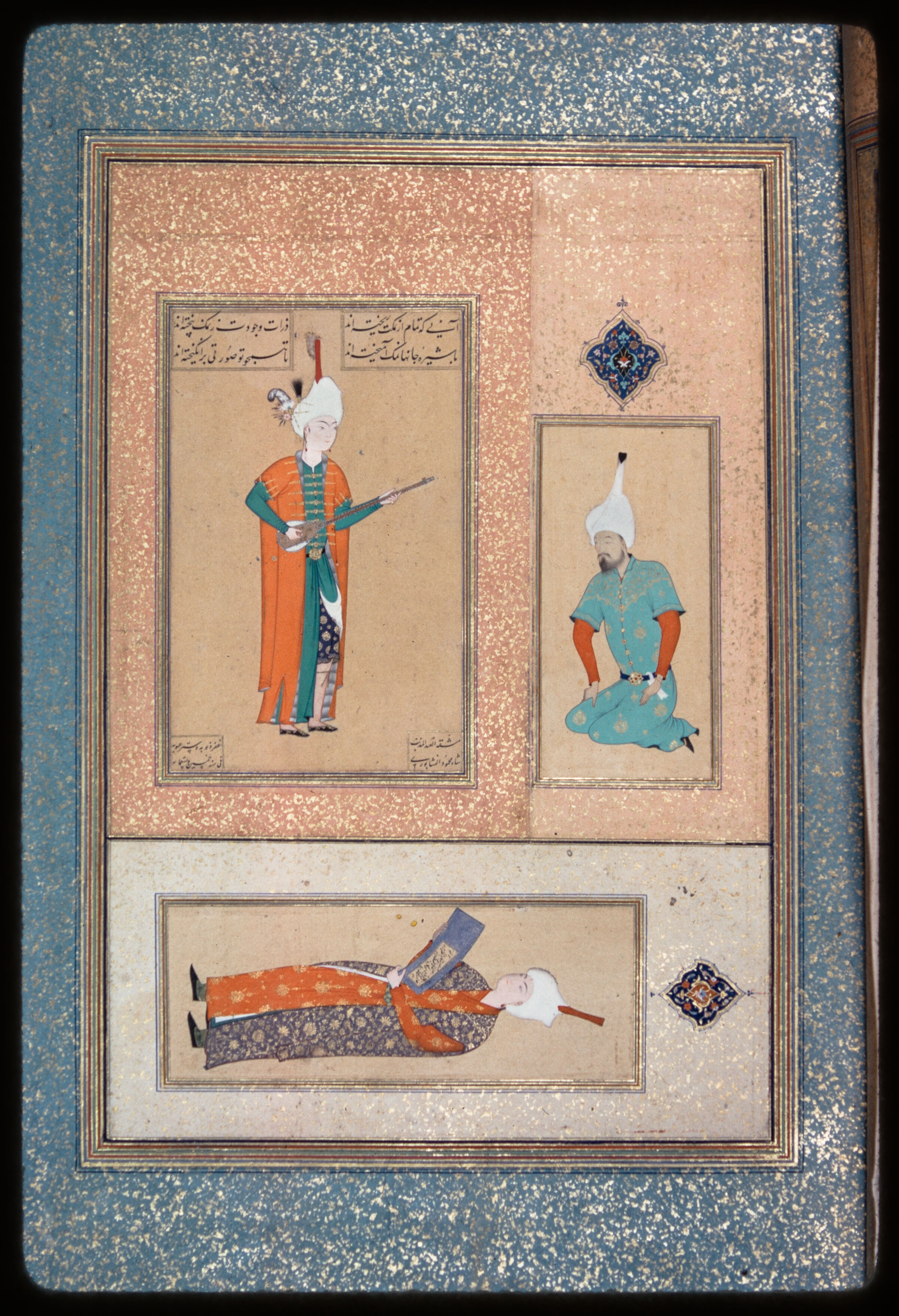
Dust Muhammad Haravi compiled and prefaced the Bahram Mirza Album, circa 1544

Dust Muhammad Haravi, also Dust Muhammad bin Sulayman Haravi (Persian: دوست محمد; fl. ca. 1511–64) was a Persian calligrapher in the 16th century. He is especially known for compiling and prefacing an important 16th century Safavid album, the Bahram Mirza Album circa 1544. In the long preface, he notably documented the history of Persian miniatures. He is likely different from another Dust Muhammad, who was a painter and went to India to serve the Mughal court.

Dust Muhammad Haravi was from Herat, and studied under the calligrapher Qasim Shadishah, a student of the famous calligrapher of Herat Sultan Ali Mashhadi. From the pen of Muhammad came out excellent artistic calligraphic manuscripts and samples. Some of them are presented in the Russian National Library in St. Petersburg. He is said to have written a copy of the Koran in nastaliq.

He was a favorite of Shah Tahmasp, and was the only calligrapher to be kept in his service. For a long time Muhammad was the head of the Safavid royal court of Prince Bahram Mirza, a famous patron of the arts, but also the master of calligraphy, artist, musician and poet. Muhammad also worked for his brother Bahram Mirza - Shah Tahmasp I, and enjoyed the title of "Royal calligrapher". Dust Muhammad also taught calligraphy to Princess Sultanum, the sister of Shah Tahmasp and Bahram Mirza. Sam Mirza also uses the attribute “Gavashvan" to refer to Dust Muhammad, explaining that he wrote nastaʻliq well, and excelled in poetry, aruz (prosody/metrics), muammā (riddles). His pen name was Kāhī.

Dust Muhammad Haravi was asked to compile this retrospective album of Persian art by the Safavid prince Bahram Mirza, so “that the scattered folios of past and present masters should be brought out of the region of dispersal into the realm of collectedness".

In his 1544 preface to the Bahram Mirza Album, Dust Muhammad acknowledged China and Europe while describing the contributions of the great naturalistic artist Ahmad Musa, active at the end of the Ilkhanate and during the Jalayirid period:

The custom of portraiture flourished in the lands of Cathay and the Franks until sharp-penned Mercury scrivened the rescript of rule in the name of Sultan Abusaʿid Khudaybanda. Master Ahmad Musa, who was his father’s pupil, lifted the veil from the face of depiction, and the [style of] depiction that is now current was invented by him. Among the scenes by him that lighted on the page of the world in the reign of the aforementioned emperor, an Abusaʿidnama, a Kalila u Dimna, a Miʿrajnama calligraphed by Mawlana Abdullah Sayrafi, and a Tarikh-i Chingizi in beautiful script by an unknown hand were in the library of the late emperor Sultan-Husayn Mirza.

— Preface to the Bahram Mirza Album (extract), by Dust Muhammad (1544)..

The first nineteen sheets album as a preface is a treatise Dust Muhammad, written by beautiful handwriting, probably belonging to the author. In addition to the Treaty on the album are three more works Dust Muhammad - two miniatures with the caption "Master Dust" and calligraphic passage, signed "Dust-Muhammad Musavvir" (the artist). The treatise is written in the Persian language, includes an introduction to the origin of the letter, the head of the masters of handwriting "taʿliq" and "nastaʿlīq", a section on the history of art and its masters, and especially - the information about the court artists and calligraphers of Bahram Mirza. Despite the confusion of mythical and historical names, the history of painting the picture painted by Dust Muhammad is of considerable interest. His writing provides a clear allusion to the existence of a religious ban images of living beings, and at the same time on the relativity of this prohibition. In his treatise Muhammad does not touch any problems the art of painting, nor any of its equipment. The value of this work lies in the extensive knowledge of the life and work of Persian artists of the 14th to 16th centuries.

== Sources ==
- Parodi, Laura E.; Wannell, Bruce (2011). "The Earliest Datable Mughal Painting". www.asianart.com.
- Chahryar Adle, “Les artistes nommés Dūst-Muḥammad au XVIe siècle,” Studia Iranica 22/2 (1993), pp. 219-96.
