= Bahram Mirza Album =

16th century Iranian art collection

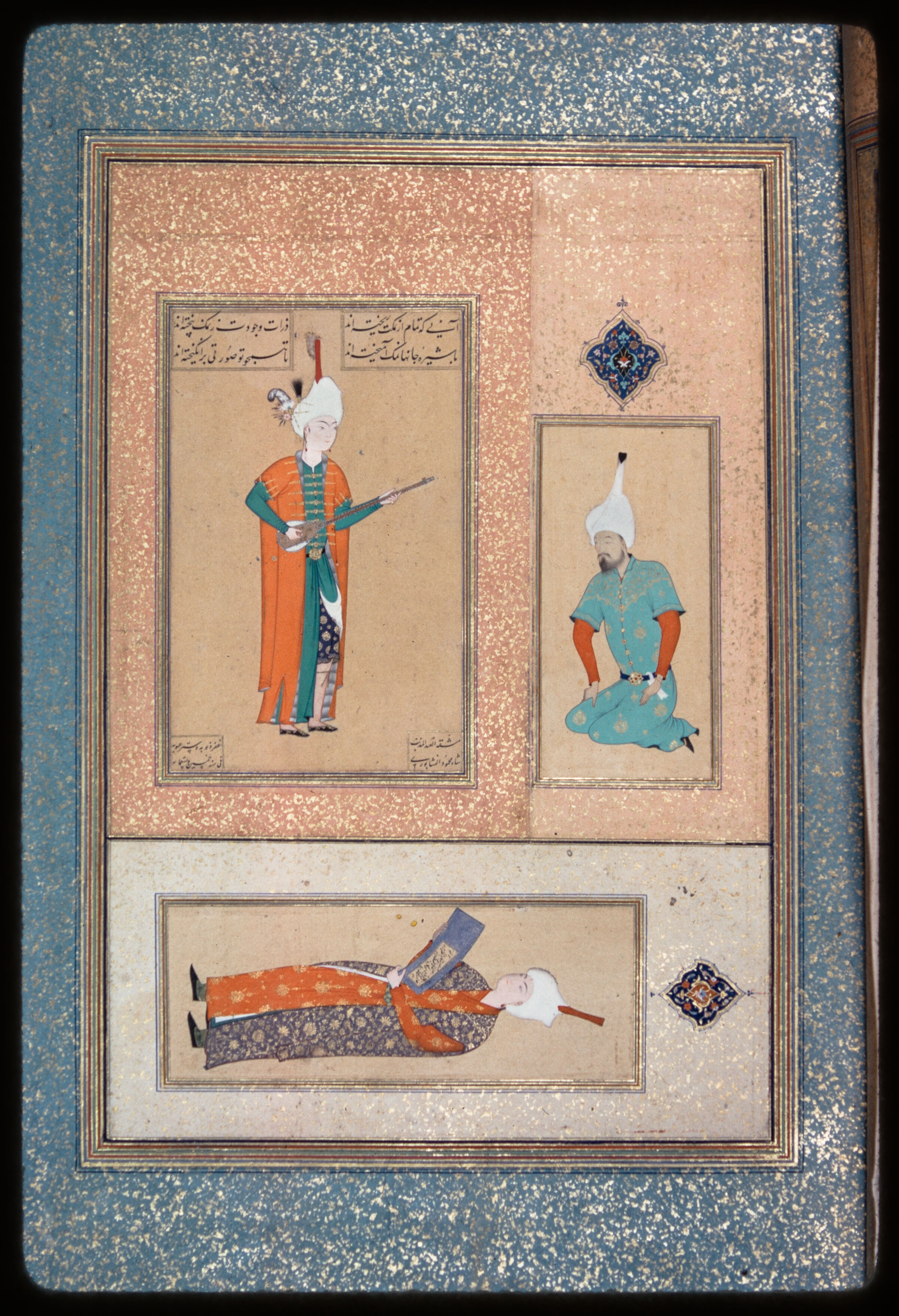
Bahram Mirza playing a sitar. Bahram Mirza Album, circa 1540

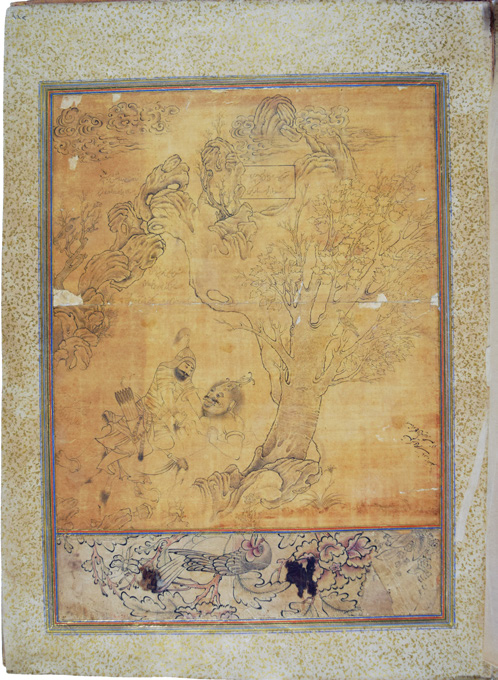
Double-page spread with Rostam Killing the White Div; by Kamal ud-Din Behzad, late 15th or early 16th century; and fragment of a Chinese-style drawing of a bird, a butterfly, and flowers, late 15th century

The Bahram Mirza Album (Persian: آلبوم بهرام میرزا) is the art collection of the Safavid prince Bahram Mirza Safavi, compiled by Dust Muhammad Haravi between 1543 and 1545. Dust Muhammad Haravi was asked to compile this retrospective album of Persian miniature painting by Bahram Mirza, so “that the scattered folios of past and present masters should be brought out of the region of dispersal into the realm of collectedness". Kept in the Topkapı Palace in Istanbul since the second half of the 16th-century, it appears to have had a significant influence on Safavid Iran's perception of a unique Persian artistic style.

== Preface by Dust Muhammad (1544) ==
The Safavid art of the miniature was in many ways a synthesis and an evolution upon the achievements of the previous schools. Dust Muhammad in the 161th century attributed the current state of the art to the foundational work of Ahmad Musa during the Il-Khanate period, while acknowledging the advances made in China and Europe:

The custom of portraiture flourished in the lands of Cathay and the Franks until sharp-penned Mercury scrivened the rescript of rule in the name of Sultan Abusaʿid Khudaybanda. Master Ahmad Musa, who was his father’s pupil, lifted the veil from the face of depiction, and the [style of] depiction that is now current was invented by him.

— Dust Muhammad, introduction to the Bahram Mirza Album (1544).

== Contents ==
The Album includes works by various distinguished artists such as Kamal ud-Din Behzad, Ahmad Musa, Abd al-Hayy, Jafar Tabrizi, Sultan Ali Mashhadi, Shah Mahmud Nishapuri, and Anisi.

The double-spread introduction of the album, which is typically devoted to court portraits, features an image of Ali, further emphasizing the Safavids' spiritual heritage from him. In the preface, Ali is referred to as the "first Islamic painter". The album also contains numerous Chinese paintings and a few European paintings, which is not specifically mentioned in the preamble.

Safavid writers and artists most likely learned about the Chinese art from artworks that had arrived in Iran several decades earlier, as there were very few cross-cultural exchanges of art items between China and Iran during the reign of Shah Tahmasp I (r. 1524–1576).

== Sources ==
- Mahdavi, Maleeha; Mayani, Yadullah Gholami (2019). "بهرام میرزای صفوی". The Great Islamic Encyclopaedia (in Persian).
- Weis, Friederike (2020). "How the Persian Qalam Caused the Chinese Brush to Break: The Bahram Mirza Album Revisited". Muqarnas Online. 37 (1): 63–109. doi:10.1163/22118993-00371P04. S2CID 230660318.

== External sources ==
- Full digitization at Harvard Library
