= 1374 =

1374 in various calendars
- Gregorian calendar: 1374; MCCCLXXIV
- Ab urbe condita: 2127
- Armenian calendar: 823; ԹՎ ՊԻԳ
- Assyrian calendar: 6124
- Balinese saka calendar: 1295–1296
- Bengali calendar: 780–781
- Berber calendar: 2324
- English Regnal year: 47 Edw. 3 – 48 Edw. 3
- Buddhist calendar: 1918
- Burmese calendar: 736
- Byzantine calendar: 6882–6883
- Chinese calendar: 癸丑年 (Water Ox); 4071 or 3864 — to — 甲寅年 (Wood Tiger); 4072 or 3865
- Coptic calendar: 1090–1091
- Discordian calendar: 2540
- Ethiopian calendar: 1366–1367
- Hebrew calendar: 5134–5135
- Hindu calendars
- Vikram Samvat: 1430–1431
- Shaka Samvat: 1295–1296
- Kali Yuga: 4474–4475
- Holocene calendar: 11374
- Igbo calendar: 374–375
- Iranian calendar: 752–753
- Islamic calendar: 775–776
- Japanese calendar: Ōan 7 (応安７年)
- Javanese calendar: 1287–1288
- Julian calendar: 1374; MCCCLXXIV
- Korean calendar: 3707
- Minguo calendar: 538 before ROC 民前538年
- Nanakshahi calendar: −94
- Thai solar calendar: 1916–1917
- Tibetan calendar: ཆུ་མོ་གླང་ལོ་ (female Water-Ox); 1500 or 1119 or 347 — to — ཤིང་ཕོ་སྟག་ལོ་ (male Wood-Tiger); 1501 or 1120 or 348

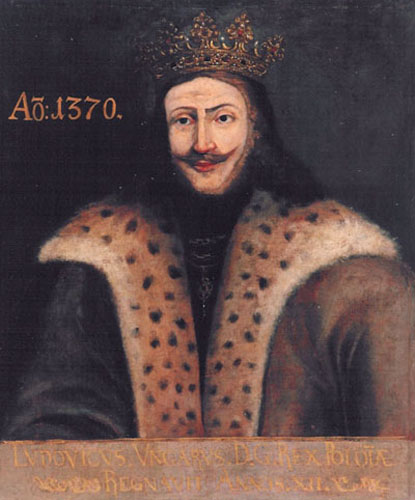
September 17:King Ludvik of Hungary and Poland extends autonomy of Poland by issuing the Privilege of Koszyce.

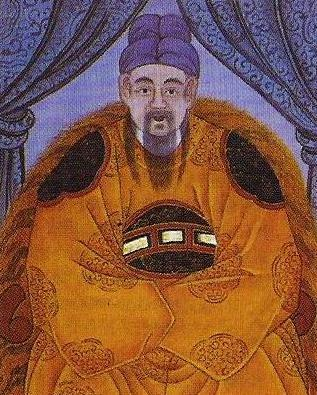
October 27: Korea's King Gongmin is assassinated.

Year 1374 (MCCCLXXIV) was a common year starting on Sunday of the Julian calendar.

== Events ==
=== January–March ===
- January 17 –
  - In Italy, at Padua, Alvise Forzatè is arrested on charges of treason and conspiracy with his nephew Filippo Forzate, in 1373, to assassinate Francesco I da Carrara, Lord of Padua. The two men are beheaded one week later on January 24.
  - King Federico of Sicily swears his allegiance to Pope Gregory XI as part of the Treaty of Villeneuve after the Pope's recognition of him as the sovereign.
- February 3 –After invading Cyprus, the Republic of Genoa bombards the city of Kyrenia, but the Cypriots repel the invasion and force the Genoese to retreat to Nicosia.
- February 11 – In Germany, the Rhine river rises high enough in the Mosel River Valley during a flood that horses reportedly drown in the streets at Koln
- February 16 – Robert de Juilly becomes the new Grand Master of the Knights Hospitaller upon the death of Raymond Berengar.
- February – In what is now Hanoi in Vietnam, the Emperor Trần Duệ Tông of Đại Việt issues decrees establishing an imperial examination for civil servants.
- March 3 – Genoa makes a second assault on Kyrenia in Cypturs by land and sea and overcomes the defenders.
- March 20 – In a meeting at Dax in what is now the département of Landes, Gaston III of Foix, overlord in France of multiple territories in the Pyrenees as Count of Foix and Viscount of Béarn forms an alliance with England's John of Gaunt

=== April–June ===
- April 8 – Pope Gregory XI issues the papal bull Salvator humani generis, condemning 14 articles of the Sachsenspiegel, challenging canon law.
- April 12 – At Almazán, now part of Spain but at the time a town in the Kingdom of Castile and León, a peace agreement is executed by King Enrique II of Castile and King Pedro IV of Aragon, with the two monarchs agreeing to the wedding of Enrique's son and Pedro's daughter.
- April 15 – The Council of Narbonne is convened for the first time since 1261 by orders of Pope Gregory XI, and will publish 28 canons of Roman Catholic law.
- April 23 –
  - Casimir IV becomes the new Duke of Pomerania upon the death of his father Bogislaw V, while Bogislaw's nephew, Bogislaw VI becomes Prince of Rügen.
  - On Saint George's Day, in recognition of services, King Edward III of England grants the English writer Geoffrey Chaucer a gallon of wine a day, for the rest of his life.
- May 20 – Edward the Black Prince, eldest son and heir apparent to England's King Edward III, presides over a council of bishops and nobles at Westminster on Whitsunday to review a demand by Pope Gregory XI for a subsidy from England to help the Papal States in the war against the Republic of Florence. In his letter, the Pope asserts his right as Lord Spiritual and refers to himself as "Lord of all". The English nobles conclude, and the bishops agree, that the Kingdom of England will not be subject to the Pope's authority.
- June 24 – The illness dancing mania begins in Aix-la-Chapelle (Aachen), possibly due to ergotism.

=== July–September ===
- July 26 – Levon of Lusignan arrives at Sis, capital of the Armenian Kingdom of Cilicia and now a set of ruins near the town of Kozan, Adana in Turkey, to take the Cilician throne left vacant by the death of King Constantine IV. Marie of Korikos, Constantine's widow, has been ruling as the regent and supports Levon's the election by Cilician nobles.
- August 18 – King Lajos of Hungary pledges his infant daughter, Princess Hedwig, to marriage to Wilhelm of Habsburg, the four-year-old son of Leopold III, Duke of Austria, as part of an alliance between Austria and Hungary.
- August 27 – In France, after 14 years as territory of the Kingdom of England, the village of Martel, Lot is retaken by Bertrand du Guesclin, "The Eagle of Brittany".
- September 12 – King Jayasthiti Malla of Nepal leads soldiers into battle against the Kingdom of Patan and captures its capital, Bhadagon, as well as imprisoning and killing 53 of the Patan leaders.
- September 14 – Levon of Lusignan is formally crowned as King Leo V of Cilicia.
- September 17 – King Lajos of Hungary, in his role as King Ludwik of Poland, promulgates the Privilege of Koszyce, granting major concessions to the nobles of Poland in return for the nobles' pledge that they will recognize his daughter, Jadwiga, as the reigning monarch upon his death. The privileges granted are a release from paying a tribute to the King as a form of property tax, except for a token amount, limiting appointments to office to persons of Polish ethnicity, release from obligations to build and repair towns, bridges and castles, release from payment of the king's expenses, and a reimbursement by the King to the nobles to pay soldiers' wages.

=== October–December ===
- October 8 – Shaikh Hasan Jalayir became the ruler of the Jalayirid Sultanate, in what is now Iraq, as the eldest son of the late Shaykh Uways Jalayir, who had been Sultan since 1356, but would reign for only one day.
- October 9 – Hussain Jalayir was installed as the new ruler of the Jalayirid Sultanate after he and the other emirs arrested and executed Hussain's older brother, the Sultan Hasan, who had reigned for only one day.
- October 27 – King Gongmin of Goryeo is assassinated by several men who invade the royal palace at Songdo, enter the King's private chamber and hack him to death with swords. King Gongmin is succeeded by U of Goryeo as ruler of Goryeo (now part of South Korea).
- November 16 – Ibn al-Khatib, Andalusi polymath, serving as a high-ranking vizier under Muhammed V, caught in intense political rivalries between Granada and Morocco, his enemies leveraged his philosophical writings to charge him with zandaqa (heresy).While imprisoned in Fez, he was secretly strangled/suffocated to death, and his body was subsequently exhumed and burned.
- November 25 – James of Baux succeeds his uncle, Philip II, as Prince of Taranto (modern-day eastern Italy) and titular ruler of the Latin Empire (northern Greece and western Turkey).
- December 18 – Alexander Neville is installed in England as the new Roman Catholic Archbishop of York.

=== Date unknown ===
- Rao Biram Dev succeeds Rao Kanhadev as ruler of Marwar (the modern-day Jodhpur district of India).
- Shaikh Hasan Jalayir succeeds his father, Shaykh Uways Jalayir, as ruler of the Jalayirid Sultanate in modern-day Iraq and western Iran. Hasan proves to be an unpopular ruler and is executed on October 9 and succeeded by his brother, Shaikh Hussain Jalayir.
- Musa II succeeds his father, Mari Djata II, as Mansa of the Mali Empire (modern-day Mali and Senegal).
- Robert de Juilly succeeds Raymond Berenger as Grand Master of the Knights Hospitaller.
- Princes from the Kingdom of Granada choose Abu al-Abbas Ahmad to succeed Muhammad as-Said, as Sultan of the Marinid Empire in Morocco. The Empire is split into the Kingdom of Fez and the Kingdom of Marrakesh.
- A form of the Great Plague returns to Europe.
- The Château de Compiègne royal residence is built in France.

== Births ==
- April 11 – Roger Mortimer, 4th Earl of March, heir to the throne of England (d. 1398)
- November 26 – Yury Dmitrievich, Russian grand prince (d. 1434)
- probable
  - Queen Jadwiga of Poland
  - King Martin I of Sicily (d. 1409)

== Deaths ==
- March 12 – Emperor Go-Kōgon of Japan (b. 1338).
- June 5 or June 6 – William Whittlesey, Archbishop of Canterbury
- June 29 – Jan Milíč of Kroměříž, Czech priest and reformer
- July 19 – Petrarch, Italian poet (b. 1304)
- September – Joanna of Flanders, Duchess of Brittany (b. 1295)
- October 27 – King Gongmin of Goryeo (b. 1330)
- November 16 – Ibn al-Khatib, Andalusi Polymath executed (b. 1313)
- November 25 – Prince Philip II of Taranto
- December 1 – Magnus Eriksson, king of Sweden (b. 1316)
- date unknown – Gao Qi, Chinese poet (born 1336)
- date unknown – Konrad of Megenberg, historian (b. 1309)
