= Ahmad Jalayir =

Jalayirid Sultan from 1382 to 1410

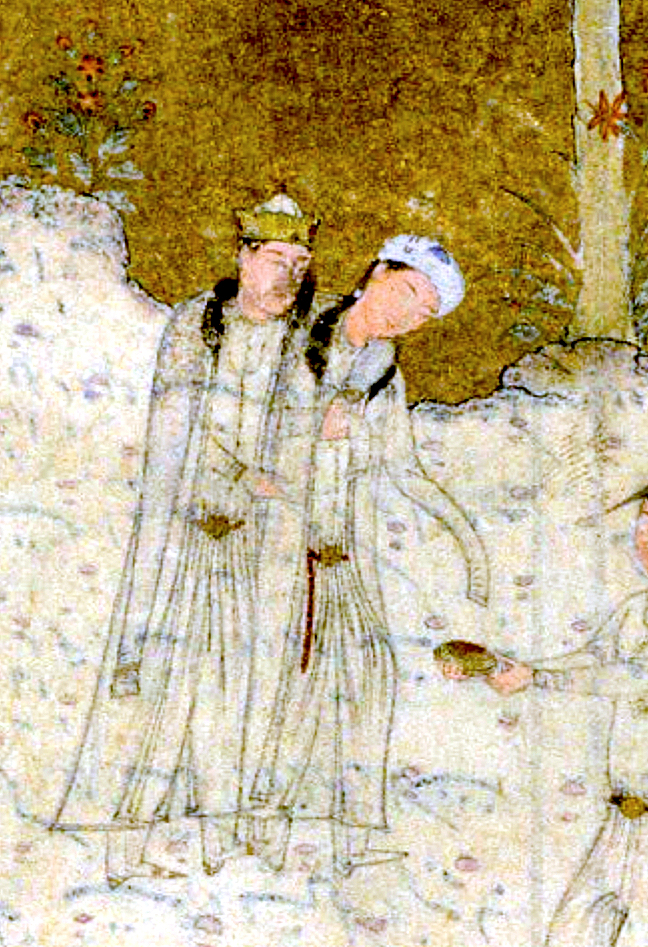
- Contemporary portrait of Sultan Ahmad Jalayir. Khamsah by Khvaju Kirmani (1396), Baghdad.

Sultan of the Jalayirids
- Reign: 1382 – 1410
- Predecessor: Shaikh Hussain Jalayir
- Successor: Shah Walad Jalayir
- Died: 1410
- Spouse: Daughter of the Qara Qoyunlu chief Qara Mahammad (father of Qara Yusuf).; Daughter of a certain Malik Izz al-Din (before 1390).
Regnal name
- Sultan Ahmad
- Dynasty: Jalayirids
- Father: Shaykh Uways Jalayir
- Religion: Islam

Sultan Ahmad (سلطان احمد جلایر) was the ruler of the Jalayirid Sultanate (ruled 1382–1410). He was son to the most accomplished ruler of the sultanate, Shaykh Uways Jalayir. Early in his reign, he was involved in conflicts with his brothers. He would later suffer from several defeats from Timur and eventually imprisoned by the Mamluks. After being set free, he attacked his old enemy, the Qara Qoyunlu but was later captured and executed in 1410.

== Sibling rivalries ==
Ahmad came to power as a result of a plot against his brother Shaikh Hussain Jalayir, who was captured and executed. Ahmad's other brothers, Shaikh Ali and Bayazid opposed him. Husain's former amir, Adil Aqa, had Bayazid proclaimed sultan in Soltaniyeh, while Shaikh Ali prepared to leave Baghdad and march to Tabriz. To secure his position, Ahmad requested the assistance of the Qara Qoyunlu (Black Sheep Turkmen) which defeated Shaikh Ali and within two years Ahmad was able to neutralize his other brother, Bayazid.

== Conflicts with Timur ==
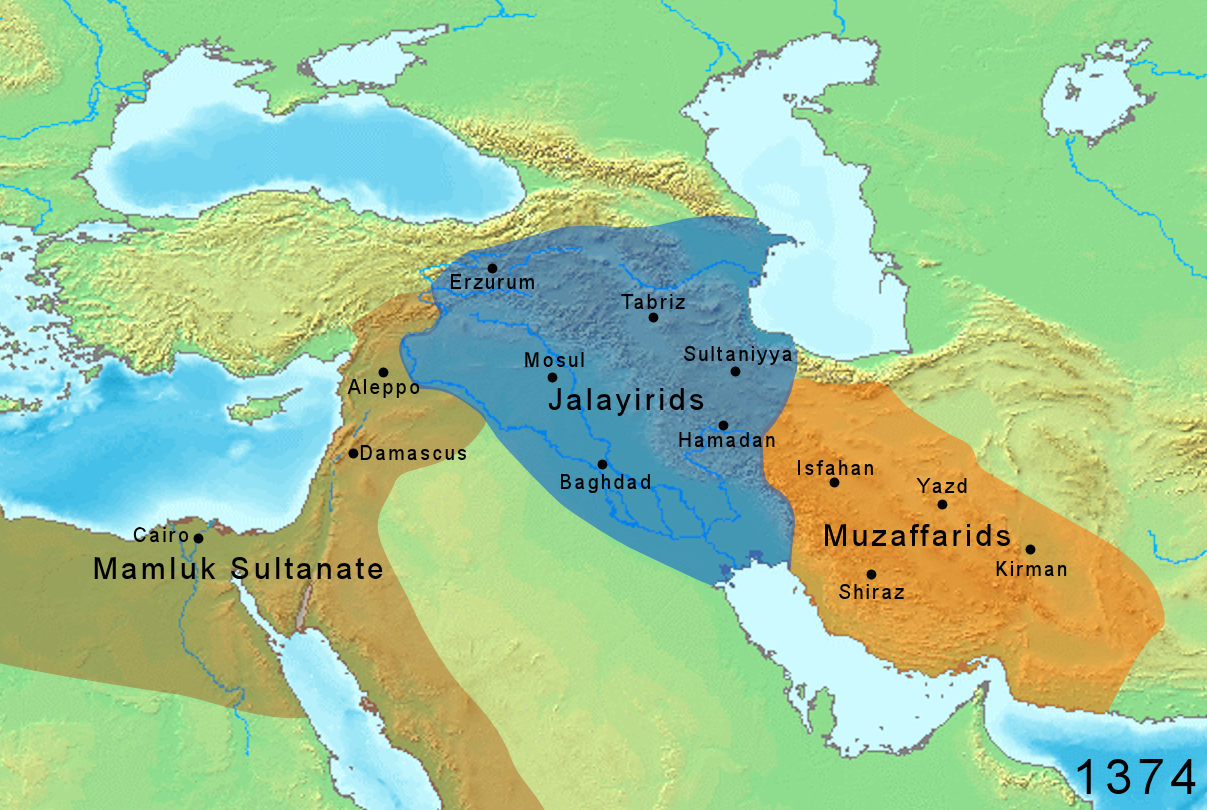
Extent of Jalayirid and Muzaffarid territories in 1374

In the spring of 1384, Timur and the Chagatai army (whom he was allied with) attacked the Jalayirids. Although Sultan Ahmad was not captured, his subordinates in Soltaniyeh failed to defend the town and Timur took it with little resistance. Timur gave the town to Adil Aqa, who had defected to him, before retiring from the campaign. Ahmad then sent an army to retake Soltaniyeh, but Adil Aqa successfully defended it.

In the midst of Timur's absence, Ahmad had to deal with an invasion by Tokhtamysh, Khan of the Golden Horde. Tokhtamysh's troops swept down into Azerbaijan, devastating the land, and Tabriz was sacked in 1385. Ahmad himself had escaped to Baghdad through the aid of his ally, Izz al-din Shir of Hakkari.

=== Loss of Tabriz (1386–1405) ===
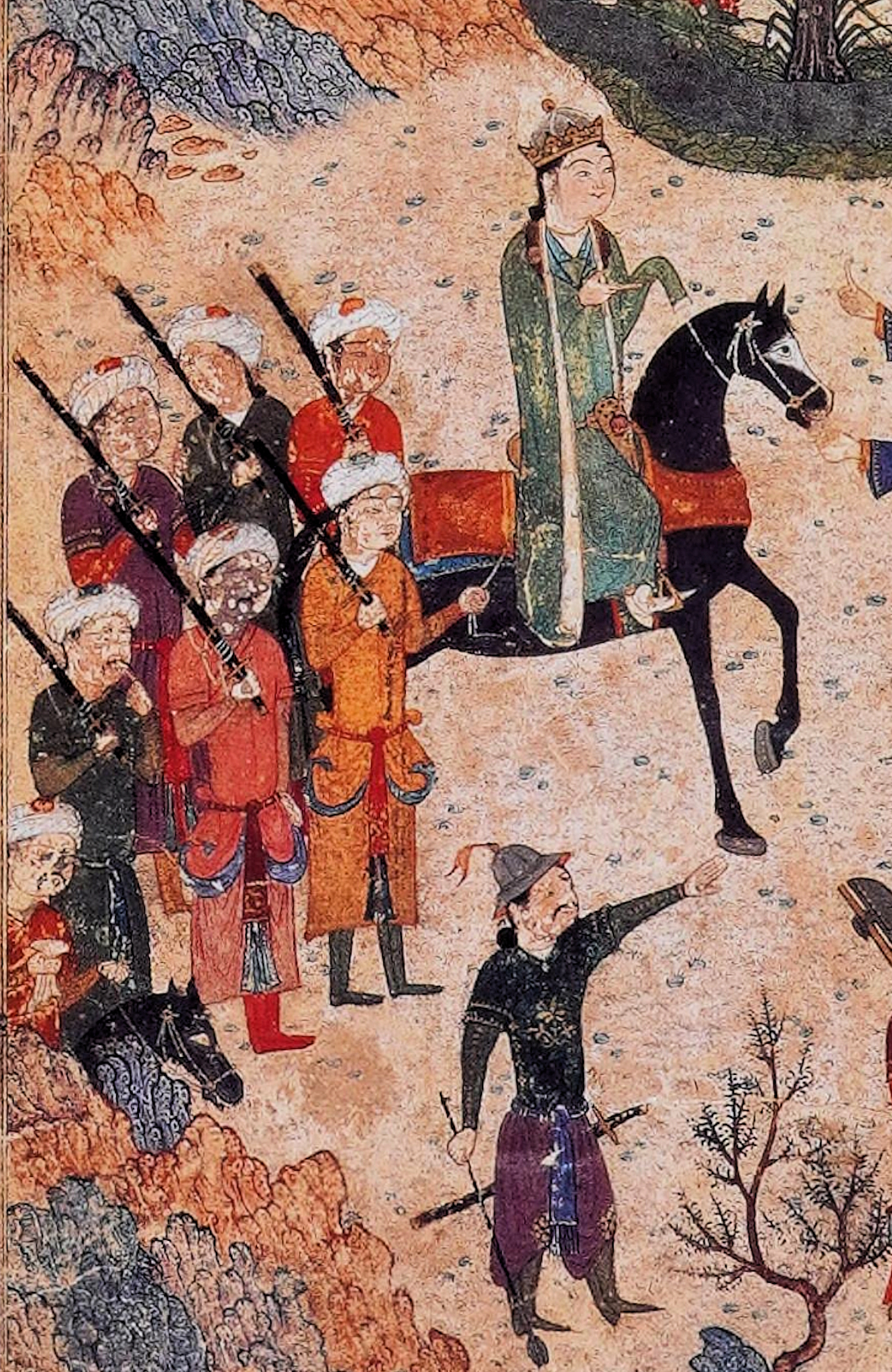
Contemporary depiction of Sultan Ahmad Jalayir on horse, with his soldiers in the Khamsah by Khvaju Kirmani (BL Add MS 18113) created in Baghdad in 1396.

The Golden Horde raid of Tabriz had significantly weakened Ahmad's position and so he could not combat Timur when he returned from his Indian campaigns with his Chagatai army in 1386. Tabriz was taken by Timur that year.

In the summer, its citizens had to pay a heavy tribute. Adil Aqa collected the tribute but was executed by Timur, who suspected him of corruption. Azerbaijan from this point on remained in the control of the Timurids, as Ahmad could not recover the province.

After 1386, Ahmad Jalayir was essentially based in Baghdad. The Kara Koyunlu ruler Kara Yusuf retreated to Mosul to avoid a sudden raid, was able to take shelter in the Ottoman Empire in 1400 with Ahmad Jalayir. The region from Azerbaijan to Darband was entrusted to Timur's son Miran Shah in 1392, with Tabriz as the capital. In 1395, Miran Shah became insane, committing unwarranted excecutions and destructions. Timur, upon returning from India went immediately to Azerbaijian in 1396 and executed Miran Shah's supporters in 1399-1400. The Timurid would hold onto Tabriz and its region for 5 more years, under the rule of Miran Shah's Mirza Umar (1383–1407). Sultan Ahmad Jalayir finally managed to recapture the city with the help of the Qara Koyunlu ruler Qara Yusuf.

=== Ruler of Baghdad ===
In 1393, Timur renewed the war with Ahmad. Near the end of August, he arrived in Baghdad, where Ahmad was residing. Deciding that defending the city was impossible, Ahmad fled and traveled to Mamluk-held Syria, and was granted asylum by Sultan Berkuk. Ahmad traveled to Dmascus and then Cairo. Meanwhile, Baghdad was forced to pay ransom and many captives (including Ahmad's son Ala al-Daula) were taken with Timur when he left the city, most of the citizens were left unharmed. A member of the Sarbadar, Khwaja Mas'ud Sabzavari, was given control of the city.

In 1394, Ahmad returned to Baghdad and Khwaja Mas'ud withdrew his forces instead of fighting. As a result, Ahmad was able to regain control of the city for the next six years. He grew increasingly unpopular, however, and in 1397 or 1398 an unsuccessful conspiracy was hatched against him. Feeling unsafe in Baghdad, he left the city and requested the assistance of the Qara Qoyunlu under Qara Yusuf. The Turkmen arrived at the city, but Ahmad had a difficult time in preventing them from plundering Baghdad, and he eventually turned them back. In 1398 Timur's son and governor of Azerbaijan, Miran Shah, attempted to take Baghdad but Ahmad successfully resisted him. In 1399, an army from the Kingdom of Georgia raised the siege of the town of Alenjaq, which the Timurids had been attempting to take for over more than a decade. The leader of the Georgian army, one of Ahmad's sons, came to Baghdad, but rebelled and was killed.

=== Renewed conflicts ===
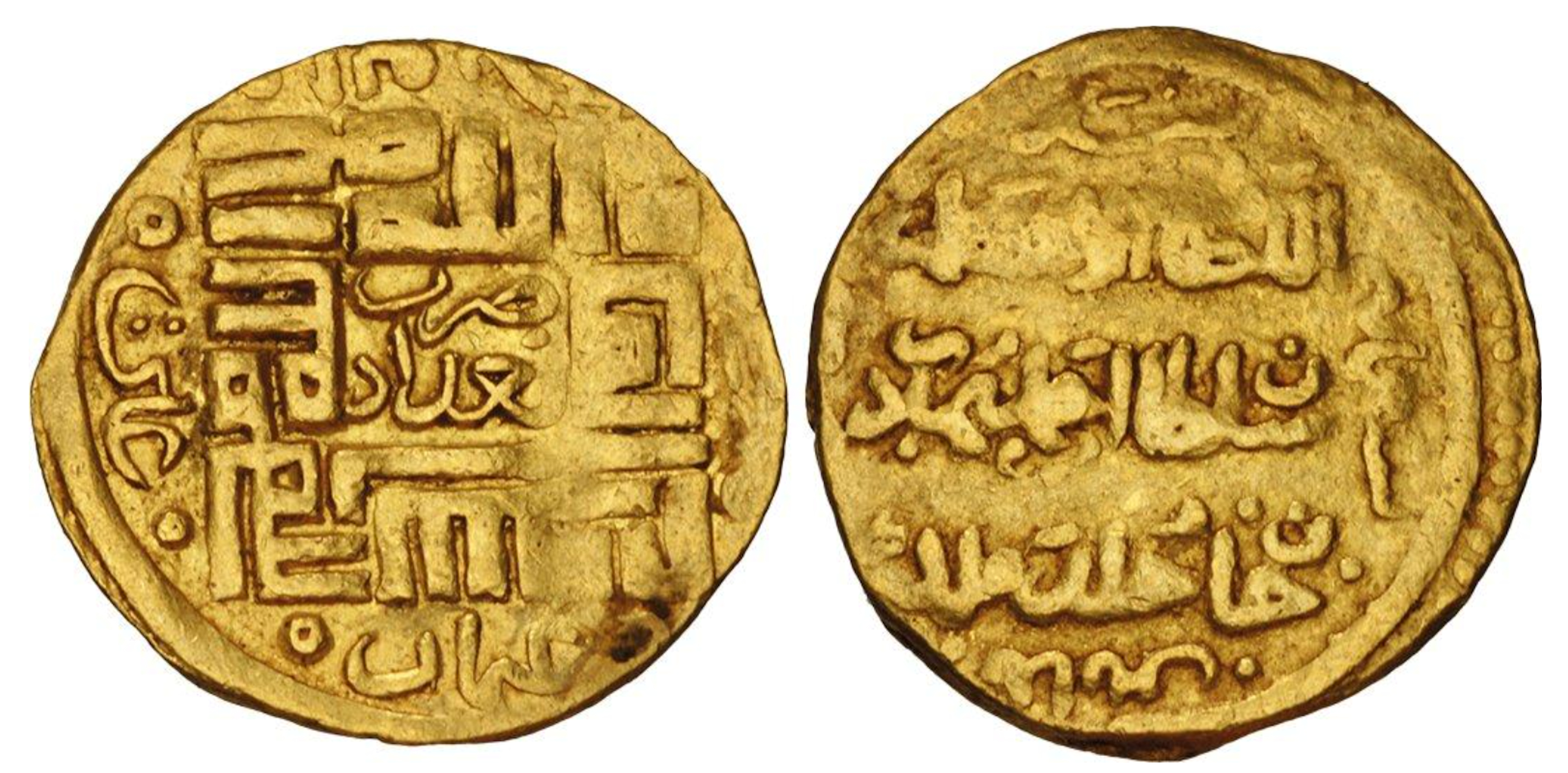
Coinage of Sultan Ahmad Jalayir. Baghdad mint. Dated AH 788 (1386-7)

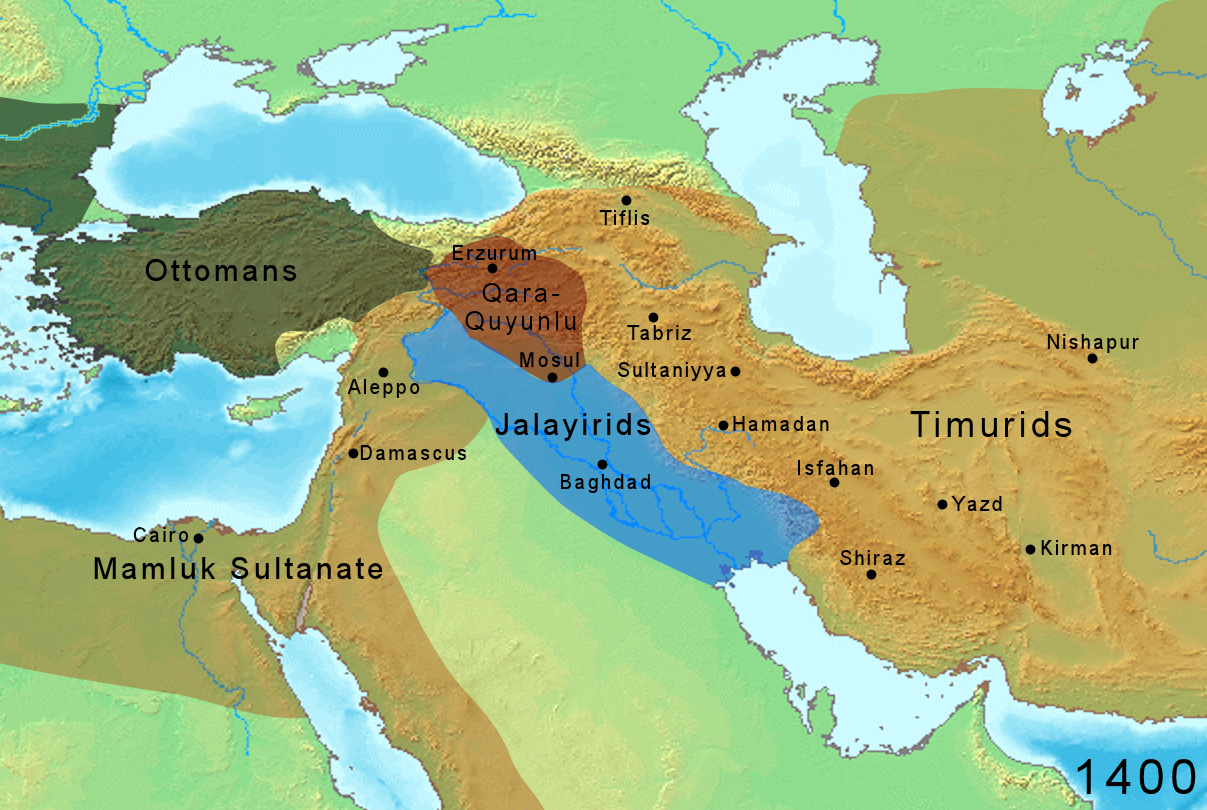
Jalayirid, Qara Qoyunlu and Timurid territories in 1400.

When Timur returned from campaigns in the east in 1400, Ahmad feared that he would be attacked and left Baghdad. He returned for a short while but then left again, taking refuge with the Ottomans. Bayezid I welcomed him together with Qara Yusuf, defiantly opposing Timur in the process, and assigned each of them a fief (Kütahya for Ahmad Jalayir and Aksaray for Qara Yusuf). Bayezid I exchanged heated letters with Timur, defying him to go to war with him. In the end, Bayezid I was defeated by Timur at the Battle of Ankara, and he died in 1402 in captivity.

In May 1401 a group of Chagatais sent to Baghdad by Timur encountered resistance. Although more Timurid troops were sent by the city commander, unaware that they were Timur's forces, they refused to give in. Timur himself soon arrived and Baghdad was subjected to a 40-day siege, when the city refused to surrender, Timur ordered the city to be stormed. Once it was taken, nearly all of the men, women and children were massacred and most of the public buildings were destroyed. The destruction was so widespread that Timur did not even bother to install a governor. In the meantime, Ahmad had again fled to Egypt.

Soon afterwards, Ahmad returned to Baghdad and began to rebuild it. Although a contingent of the Chagatai army nearly captured him, he came back a few months later in 1402 with the Qara Qoyunlu ruler Qara Yusuf, who had also sought refuge with the Ottomans. Their friendship, however, did not last, and Qara Yusuf expelled Ahmad from the city. Ahmad fled to the Egyptian Mamluks a second time, who imprisoned him out of fear of Timur. In 1403, Qara Yusuf was driven out of Baghdad by the Timurids, and sought asylum with the Mamluks, who also imprisoned him. Reunited in prison, both Ahmad and Qara Yusuf renewed their friendship and struck an agreement with each other, whereby Ahmad would retain Iraq, and Qara Yusuf would take over Azerbaijan.

=== Art of the book ===
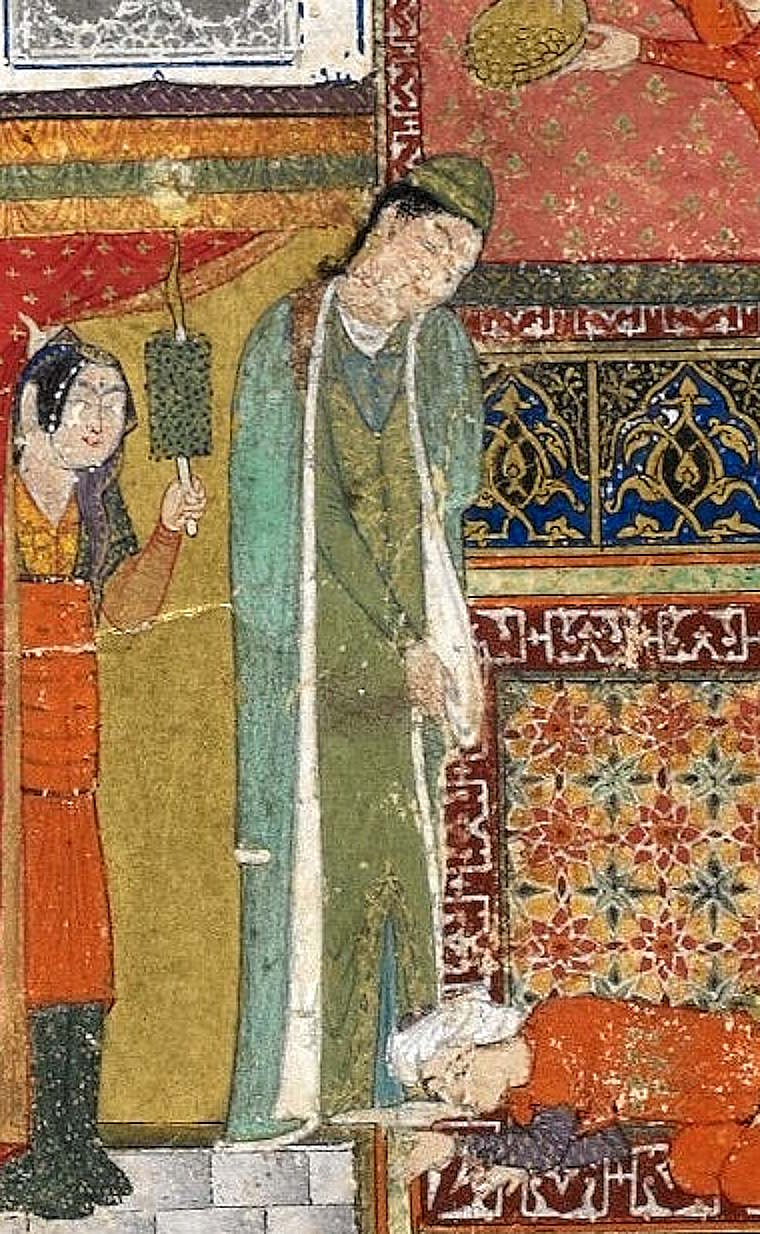
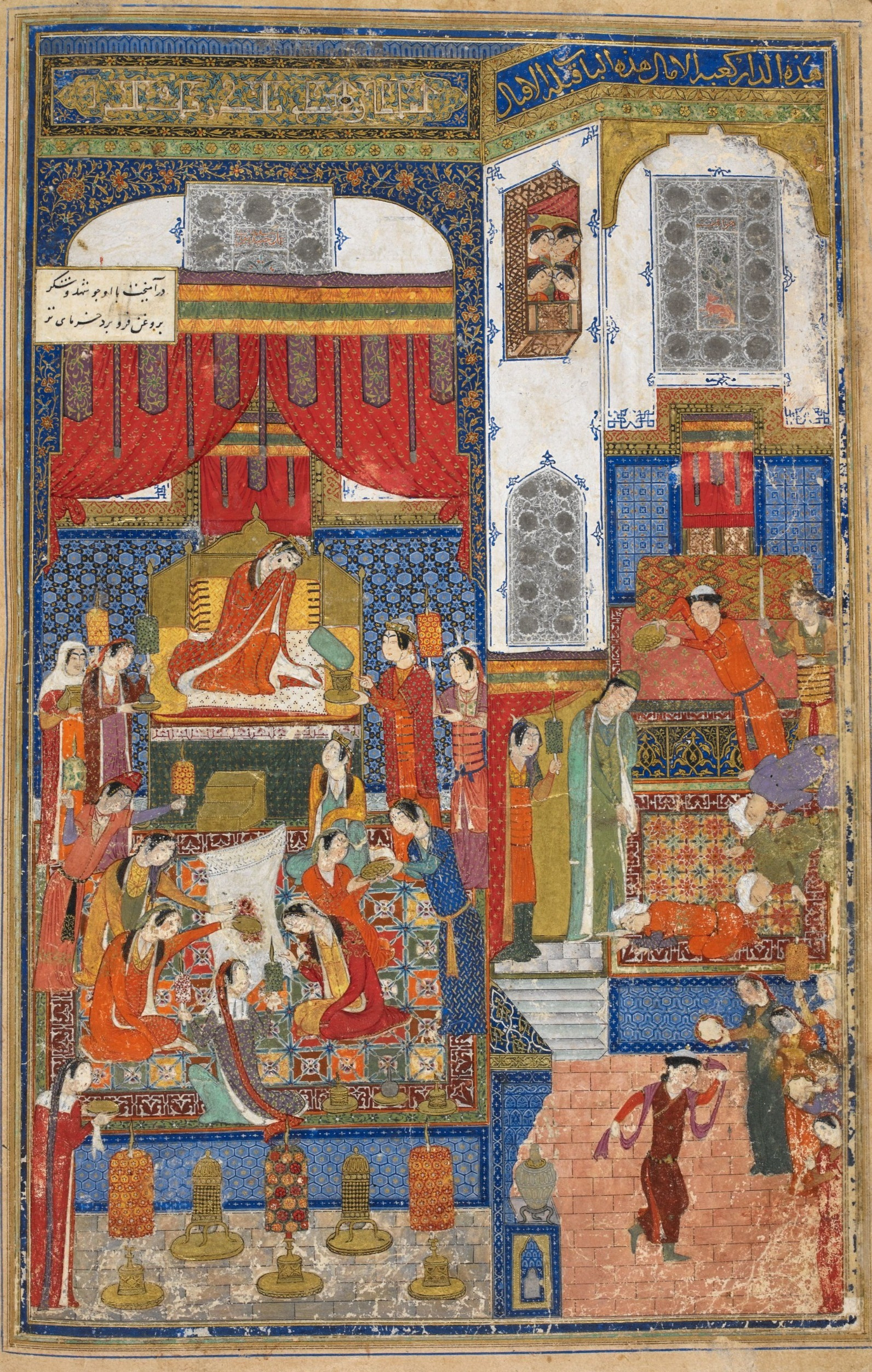
Likeky depiction of an unspecified marriage of Sultan Ahmad Jalayir. Khamsah by Khvaju Kirmani (1396).

The capital city of Tabriz, controlled by the Jalayirids since 1358, developed a strong and highly sophisticated miniature tradition during the time of the Jalayirid Sultanate. Historically, the Tabriz school of miniatures was founded in the 14th century (before the Shiraz and Herat schools), and was based on the Mongol Ilkhanid and Uighur pictorial traditions. Tabriz was the center of origin of the kitabkhana system of ateliers, which then spread through the Orient at a scale comparable to the European Renaissance.

Already in the 14th century, Tabriz was a cultural hub functioning as the center of many Turkic states in the region, and already incorporated elements of Turkic art and culture. The expressive quality of these creations in a sense surpasses anything that came before of after. The creations of Tabriz during the reign of Ahmad Jalayir can be seen in exquisite works such as Kalila and Dimna (MS Topkaki H.362) created in Tabriz in 1375-1385, more copies of Kalila and Dimna (BNF, MS persan 376) and Kalila and Dimna (BNF, MS persan 376) illustrated in Jalayirid Baghdad in 1385-95, a splendid Khamsah by Khvaju Kirmani (BL Add MS 18113) created in Baghdad in 1396.

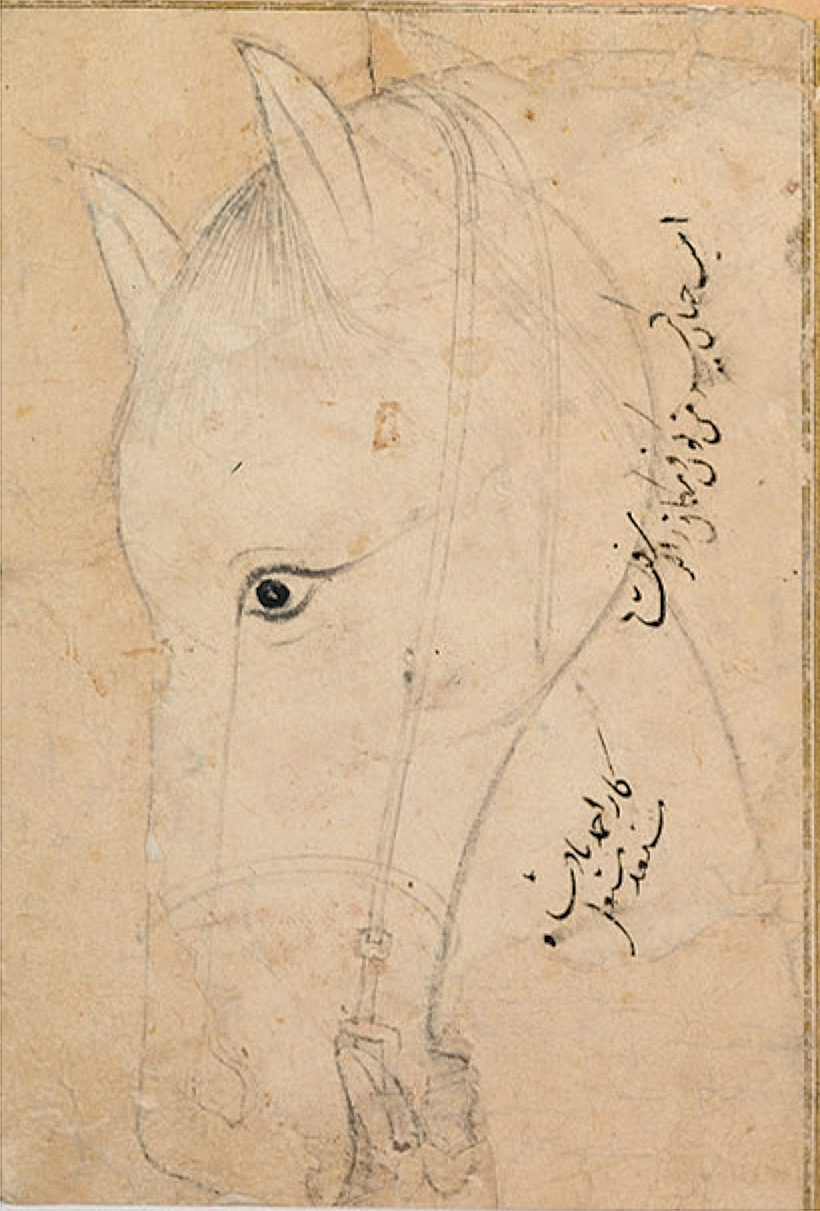
Head of a Horse attributed to Sultan Ahmad Jalayir himself, with inscription: "My world-seizing horse has conquered the universe. Work of Sultan Ahmad, the ready, the enflamed". Tabriz or Baghdad, late 14th century. Ya'qub Beg Album, TSMK, H. 2153.

At the time of his conquest of Tabriz in 1386 (which he would hold until 1405), the Turco-Mongol invader Timur relocated many of the Tabriz artists to Samarkand, influencing the styles in the Timurid realm, in Samarkand, Herat, and Shiraz. The Jalayirids finally recovered Tabriz in 1405, and a remarkable illustrated manuscript was still created there in the last years of Sultan Ahmad Jalayir's reign in 1405-1410, the Khosrow and Shirin (Freer Galery of Art). The style of this work had much in common with the productions of Baghdad, the other Jalayirid capital, but with a higher degree of finition. In the 16th century, Dust Muhammad described Ahmad Jalayir's abilities and interest for art:

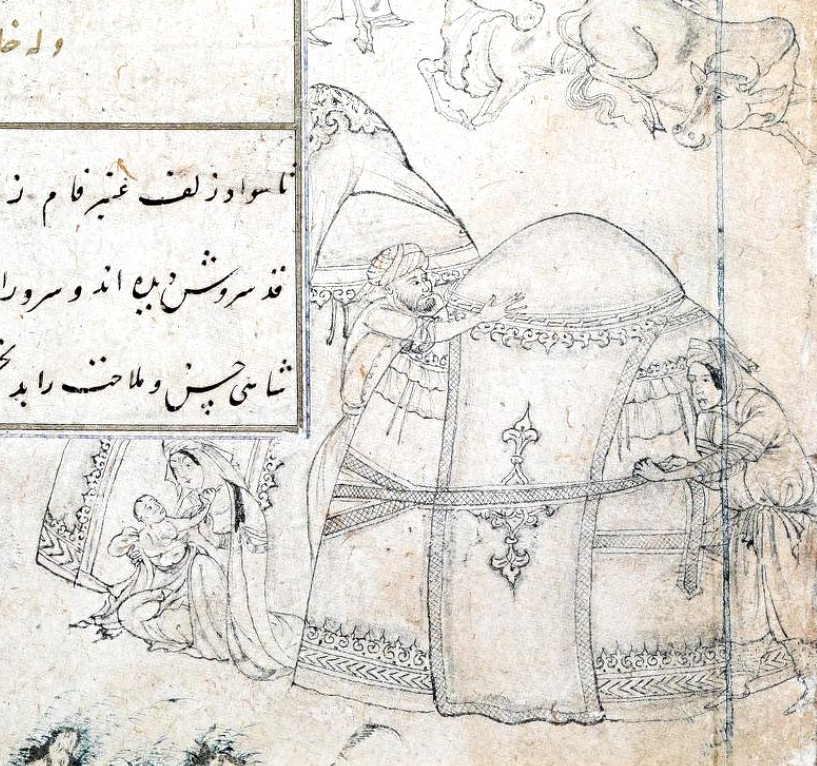
Drawing of pastoral scene with yurts, possibly made by Sultan Ahmad himself or his teacher Abd al-Hayy. Divan by Sultan Ahmad Jalayir 1400-1403, Baghdad.

Khwaja AbdulHayy, in the time of the emperor Sultan-Ahmad of Baghdad, whose countenance shone in patronizing the masters of learning and perfection, took up the pen of uniqueness and instructed Sultan Ahmad in depiction so that the sultan himself produced a scene in the Abusa'idnama in pen and ink.

— Preface to the Bahram Mirza Album (extract), by Dust Muhammad.

Ahmad Jalayir is known for actively participating to artistic creation. A drawing of a horse's head was drawn and dedicated by him. Ahmad learned the black-pen technique from his main painter Khvaja ʿAbd al-Hayy.

It is known that some illustrated manuscripts of the Jalayirids were copied and emulated by the Timurids. A written remark by Dust Muhammad mentions that the Timurid ruler Baysunghur ordered a book to be made with the exact same specifications (dimensions, arrangement of text, illustrations) as a Jalayirid original.

== Final years in Tabriz (1405–1410) ==
When Timur died in 1405, Nasir-ad-Din Faraj, the Mamluk Sultan of Egypt, released Ahmad. Ahmad returned to Baghdad, and taking advantage of a local insurrection, managed to take back the city, eliminating the administration of Mirza Ömer, son of Miran Shah, who had been in charge of ruling the city for the Timurids.

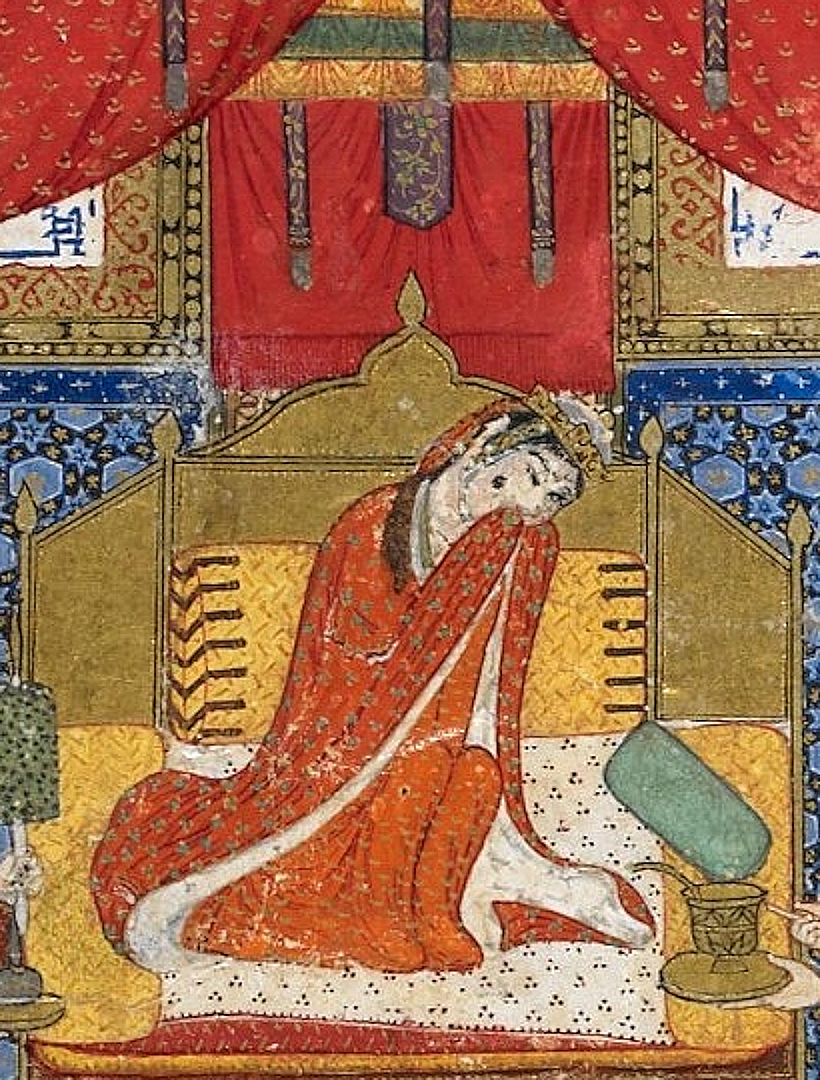
A queen of Sultan Ahmad Jalayir, Baghdad, 1396. Khamsah by Khvaju Kirmani.

Meanwhile, Qara Yusuf took up residence in Tabriz. In spite of their agreement, however, this situation did not last. Ahmed wanted to regain Azerbaijan and, as a result he attacked the Qara Qoyunlu. He managed to occupy Tabriz for a few years, but was defeated in August 1410 where he was captured by Qara Yusuf and executed. Ahmad's son Ala-ud-Daula, who had been released by the Timurids, was also killed. Ahmad's nephew Shah Walad Jalayir briefly succeeded him in Baghdad but the Qara Qoyunlu took the city a year later. The illustrated manuscript Basatin al-uns (TSMK Ms. R. 1032) seems to have been created at the juncture of these events, and may be one of the last manuscripts created by the Jalayirids in Baghdad, since the dedication to Ahmad Jalayir seems to have been damaged by the invaders and the illustrations remained unfinished.

The Jalayirids were eventually pushed south into lower Iraq, ruling over the towns of Hillah, Wasit and Basra until defeated by the Qara Qoyunlu in 1432, bringing an end to the dynasty.

== Issue ==
Ahmad Jalayir had at least 2 children:

- Ala-ud-Daula
- A daughter engaged to Mustafa Çelebi

== Sources ==
- Hasanzade, Jamila; Goyushov, Nasib; Vasilyeva, Olga; Yastrebova, Olga (2021). The Magic of the Pen: Selected Miniatures from the Khamsa of Nizami Ganjavi (PDF). Boyut Publishing Group / Ones Media. ISBN 978-9952-8413-5-0.
- Peter Jackson (1986). The Cambridge History of Iran, Volume Six: The Timurid and Safavid Periods. ISBN 0-521-20094-6
- Jalayerids. Encyclopædia Iranica. Center for Iranian Studies, Columbia University. June, 2004. Retrieved May 21, 2006.

Preceded by Shaikh Hussain Jalayir	Jalayirid Ruler; 1382–1410	Succeeded by Shah Walad Jalayir
