= Shaykh Uways Jalayir =

Jalayirid ruler of Iraq

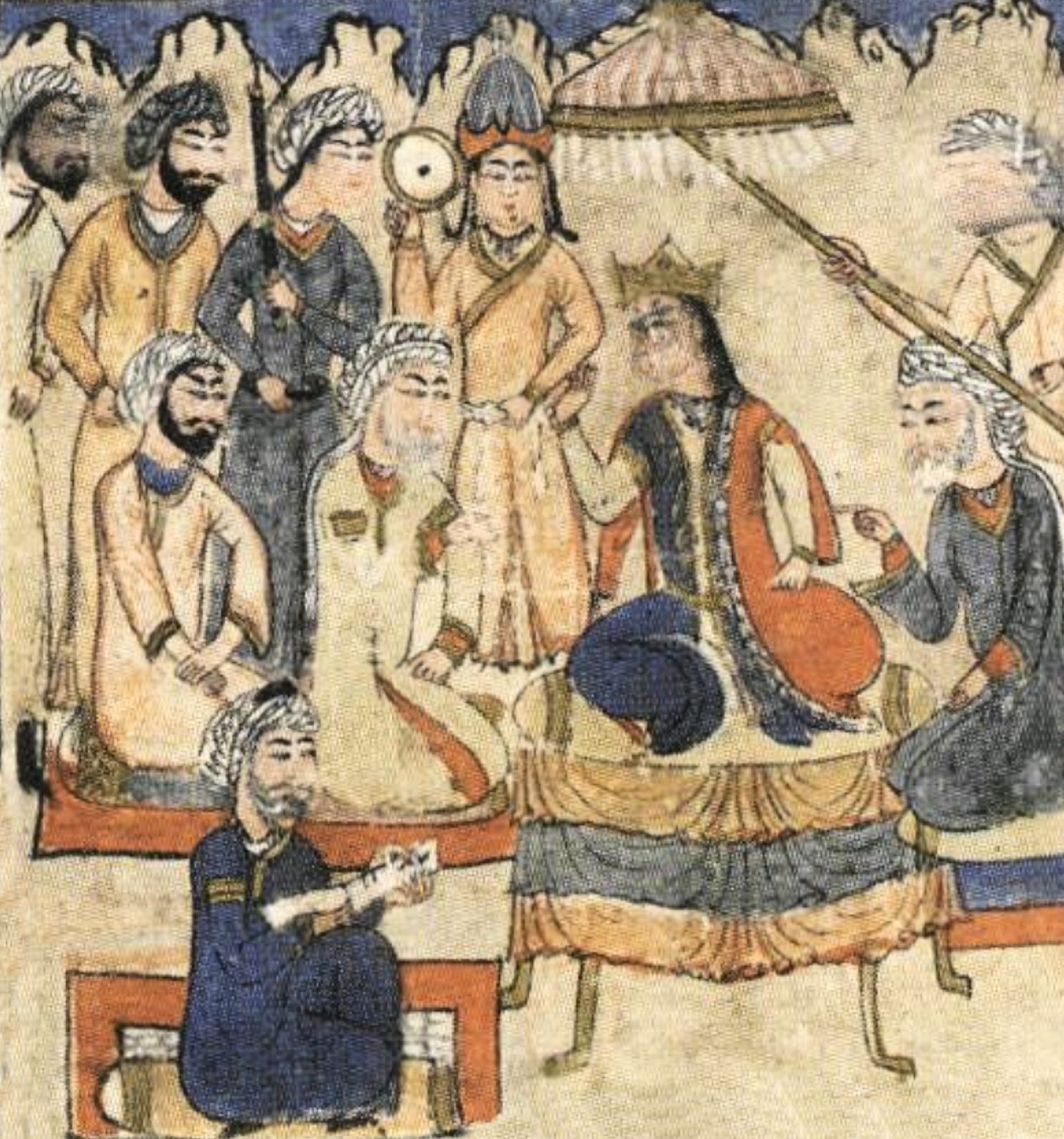
- Muhammad b. Muhammad al-'Arif presents his work, Farhäd u Gulistan, to Shaikh Uvays Bahadur Khan. Farhädnäma, Karabagh and Ardabil (1369-72) (Istanbul Topkapi Palace Museum Ms. H. 678)

Sultan of the Jalayirids
- Reign: 1356 – 1374
- Predecessor: Hasan Buzurg
- Successor: Shaikh Hasan Jalayir
- Died: 10 October 1374; Tabriz, Iran
- Burial: Shadbad-e Mashayekh, Tabriz
- Spouse: Haji Mama Khatun
Regnal name
- Sultan Shaykh Uways Bahadur Khan
- Dynasty: Jalayirids
- Father: Hasan Buzurg
- Mother: Dilshad Khatun
- Religion: Islam

Shaykh Uways Jalayir (Persian: شیخ اویس جلایر) was the Jalayirid ruler of Iraq (1356–1374) and Azerbaijan (1360–1374). He was the son of Hasan Buzurg and the Chobanid princess Dilshad Khatun.

== Rise to throne ==
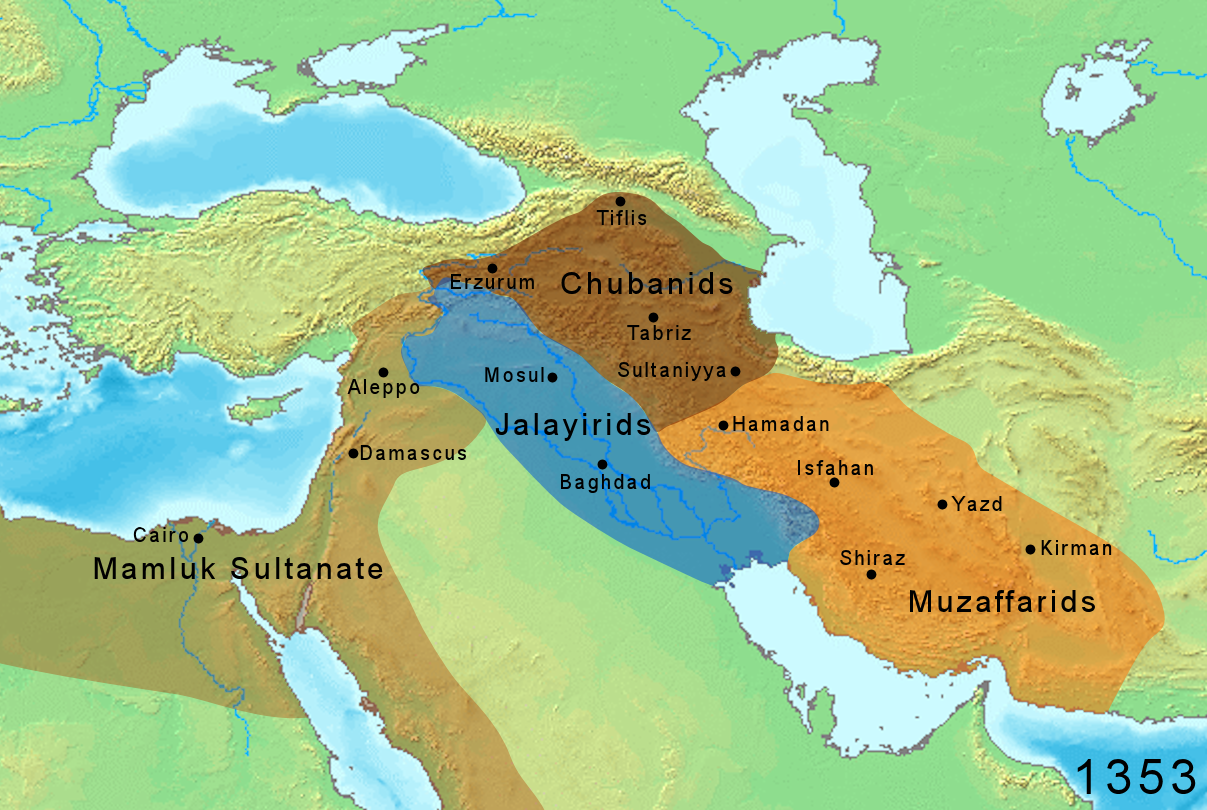
Territory of the Jalayirids , Chobanids and Muzaffarid in 1353, at the onset of Shaykh Uways'reign

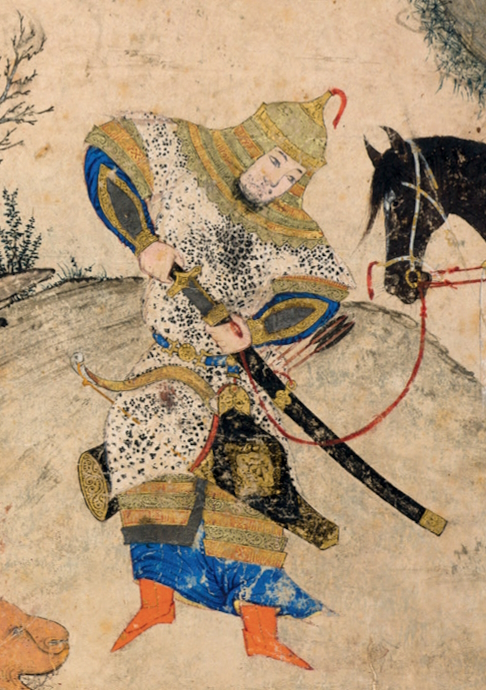
Great Jalayirid Shāhnāma, Tabriz or Baghdad, ca. 1370–74, at the end of the reign of Shaykh Uways Jalayir.

Shortly after Shaykh Uways Jalayir succeeded his father, the old enemy of the Jalayirids, the Chobanids, were overrun by the forces of the Golden Horde under Jani Beg in 1357. Malek Asraf was executed, and Azerbaijan was conquered. Following Jani Beg's withdrawal from Azerbaijan, as well as his son Berdi Beg's similar abandonment of the region in 1358, the area became a prime target for its neighbors. Shaykh Uways Jalayir, who at first had recognized the sovereignty of the Blue Horde, decided to take the former Chobanid lands for himself, even as a former amir of Malek Asraf's named Akhi Juq attempted to keep the region in Mongol hands.

=== Conquest of Tabriz (1358) ===
Uvais conquered the area in August 1358, following a swift victory over remnants of Chobanids in a battle near Sitay mountain. In addition to Baghdad, he could now boast Tabriz as a large city under his control. Apart from a tumultuous beginning, Shaykh Uways based himself in Tabriz for the rest of his reign, until his natural death there in 1374, and made Tabriz the Jalayirid capital.

Shaykh Uways had certain problems with Genoese who tried to build a stronghold city's vicinity, which caused Genoa to boycott the region.

Unlike his predecessors who only claimed to be emirs ( umara ) of figurehead ilkhans, Shaykh Uways claimed regal titles like sultan, khan and even ilkhan.

Moving on, he sent his emir Ali Piltan towards Nakhchivan, where Akhi Juq was hiding. However, he was disastrously defeated on 28 January 1359, Uways had to retreat to Baghdad and lost Tabriz to Akhi Juq temporarily. Same year Muzaffarids conquered Tabriz and Mubariz al-Din Muhammad became the new ruler of the region, as well as a new rival. However this rivalry was cut short when the latter was blinded and imprisoned by his own son Shah Shuja. Uways was now master of Azerbaijan once again. Although Temürtas once campaigned to regain Chupanid territories, he was turned over to Uways by Khizrshah of Ahlat (d. 1384) to be executed in 1360.

== Consolidation of rule ==
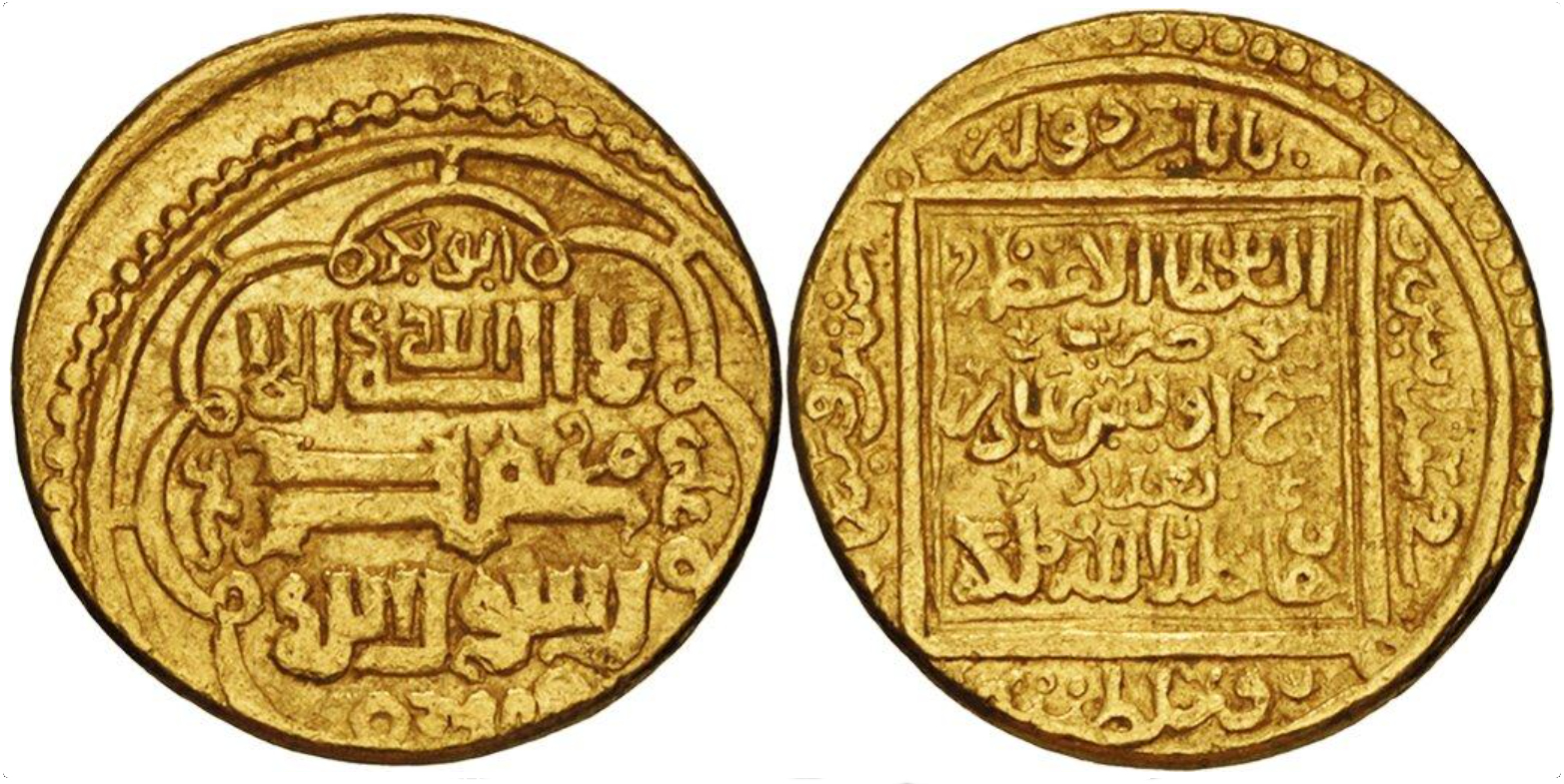
Gold coin of Shaykh Uways I (1356-1374), Baghdad mint, dated AH 762 (AD 1360-1)

During his reign, Shaykh Uways Jalayir sought to increase his holdings in Iran. He became involved in the power struggles of the Muzaffarids, supporting Shah Mahmud in his efforts against his brother Shah Shuja. Shah Mahmud received support around 1363 in his conquest of Shiraz and later his son married one of Shaykh Uways Jalayir's daughters in 1369/70.

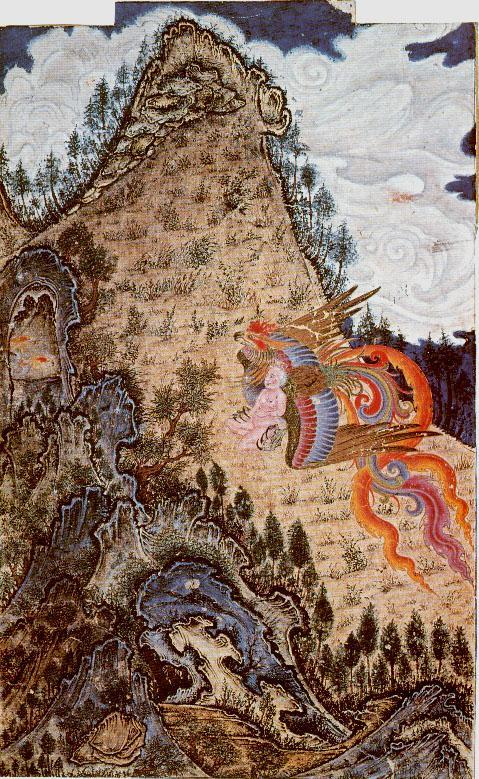
Abduction of Zal by the Simurgh. Shahnama (Topkapı, Hazine 2153), created circa 1370 under Shaykh Uways Jalayir. Tabriz (Topkapı, Hazine 2153)

In 1364, Shaykh Uways Jalayir campaigned against the Shirvanshah Kavus, but a revolt begun by the governor of Baghdad, Khwaja Murjan, forced him to return to reassert his authority. The revolt was supported by Al-Ashraf Sha'ban of the Mamluk Sultanate. Although Uways managed to defeat Murjan, he was pardoned in the end, and was reinstated as governor eventually in 1367 until his death in 1374.

In 1366, Shaykh Uways Jalayir marched against the Black Sheep Turkmen, defeating their leader Birdi Khwaja in Mosul and his brother Bayram Khwaja, at the battle of Mush. Later, he turned his attention toward Shirvanshah Kavus again who had attacked Tabriz twice in the meantime. His emir Bayram Beg besieged Shamakhi for 3 months after which Kavus was jailed for another 3 months. He was pardoned and accepted to become Jalayirid vassal with his son Hushang being Uways' hostage until 1372.

In 1367, his brother Amir Qasim died of consumption, while his favorite general Bayram Beg who subdued Shirvan also died of excessive drinking. Following year Uways also lost his wife Haji Mama Khatun.

=== Art of the book ===
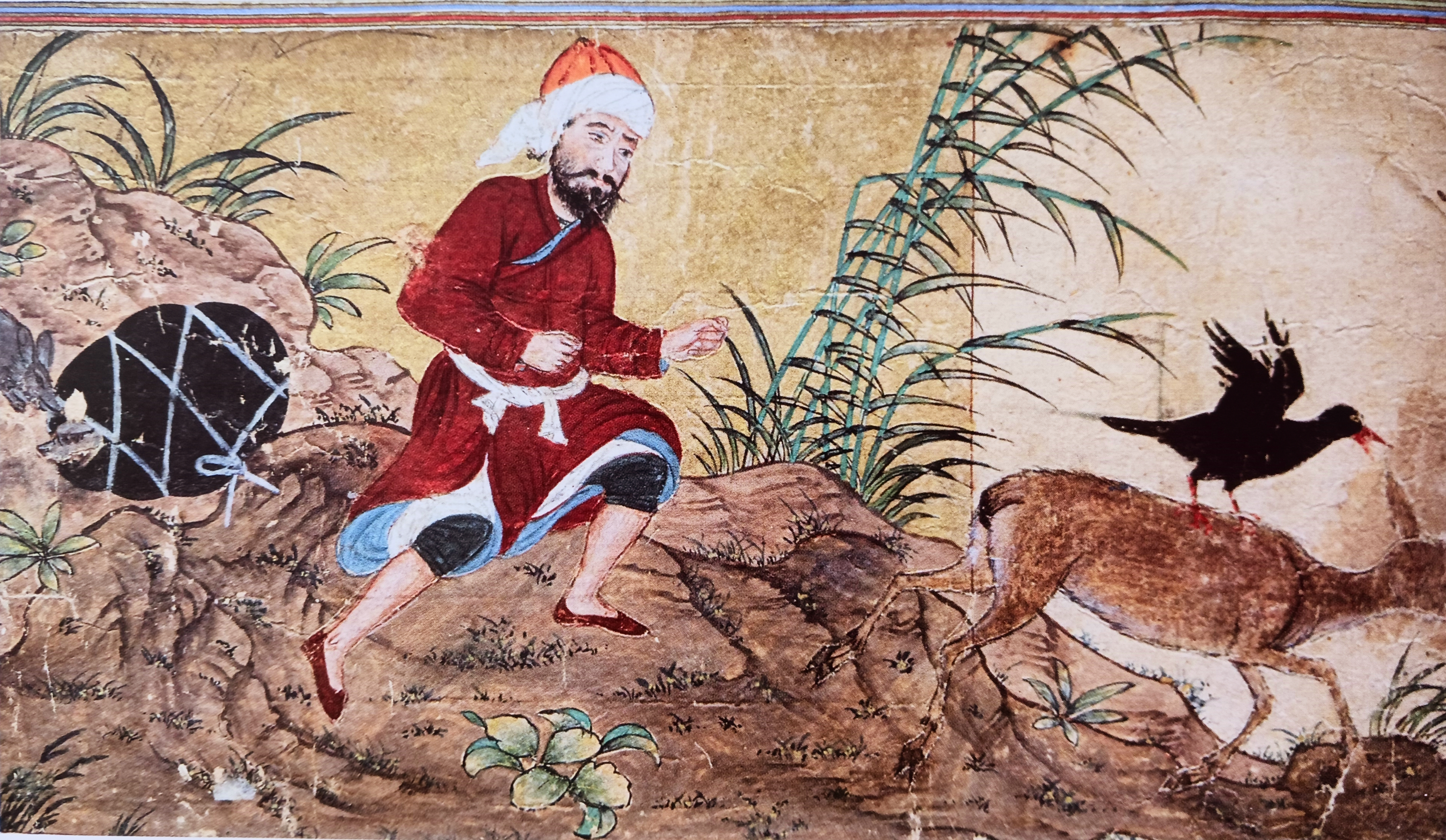
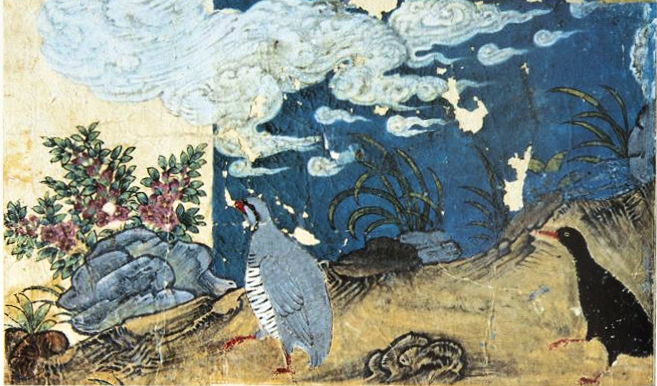
Scenes from Kalila and Dimna (1370-74) created under Shaykh Uvays at the peak of the Jalayirid school in Tabriz

Under Shaykh Uways Jalayir, the capital city of Tabriz, occupied since 1358 by the Jalayirids, developed a strong and highly sophisticated miniature tradition. Historically, the Tabriz school of miniatures was founded in the 14th century (before the Shiraz and Herat schools), and was based on the Mongol Ilkhanid and Uighur pictorial traditions. Tabriz was the center of origin of the kitabkhana system of ateliers, which then spread through the Orient at a scale comparable to the European Renaissance.

The creations of Tabriz under Shaykh Uways Jalayir can be seen in exquisite works such as Kalila and Dimna (1370-74), representing the peak of the Jalayirid school, Already in the 14th century, Tabriz was a cultural hub functioning as the center of many Turkic states in the region, and already incorporated elements of Turkic art and culture. The expressive quality of these creations in a sense surpasses anything that came before of after.

== End of reign ==
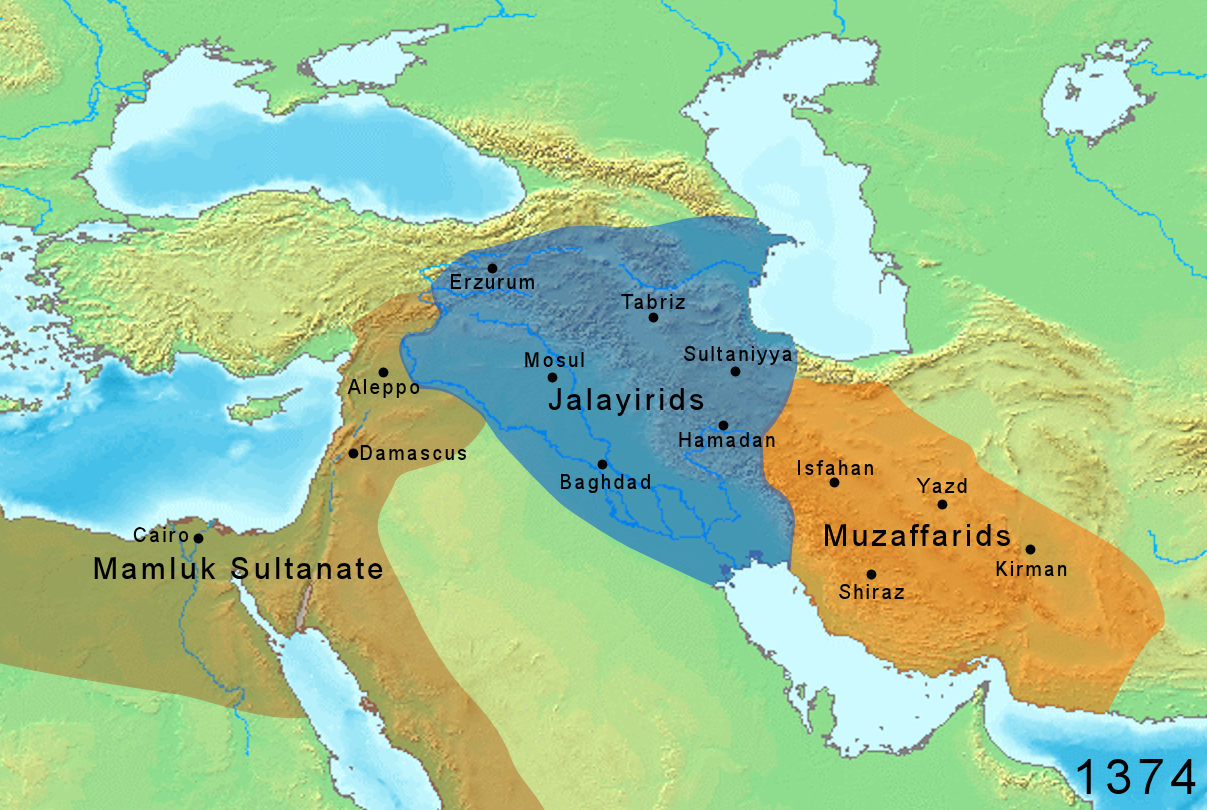
Extent of Jalayirid and Muzaffarid territories in 1374 at the end of the reign of Shaykh Uways Jalayir

He tried to establish relations with Republic of Venice in 1369 unsuccessfully. In an effort to extend further east, he fought against Amir Vali, who ruled in Astarabad, and defeated him in Ray in 1371. When his brother Amir Zahid died in Ujan after falling off the palace roof, however, he was forced to turn back. The governorship of Ray was trusted in the hands of a Qutlugh Shah, who was followed two years later by ‘Adil Aqa.

Due to his campaigns, Shaykh Uways Jalayir spent much time in Iran, and he died in Tabriz on 10 October 1374; Baghdad, however, remained his capital. During his lifetime, the Jalayirid state reached its peak in power. In addition to his military adventures, which were considerable, he was known for his attempts to revive commercial enterprise, which had suffered heavily in the past years, in the region, as well as his patronage to the arts. His chronicler, Abu Bakr al-Qutbi al-Ahari, wrote of Shaykh Uways Jalayir’s deeds in the Tarikh-i Shaikh Uvais.

Shaykh Uways Jalayir was succeeded by his son Shaikh Hasan Jalayir, who was assassinated on the same day.

== Children ==
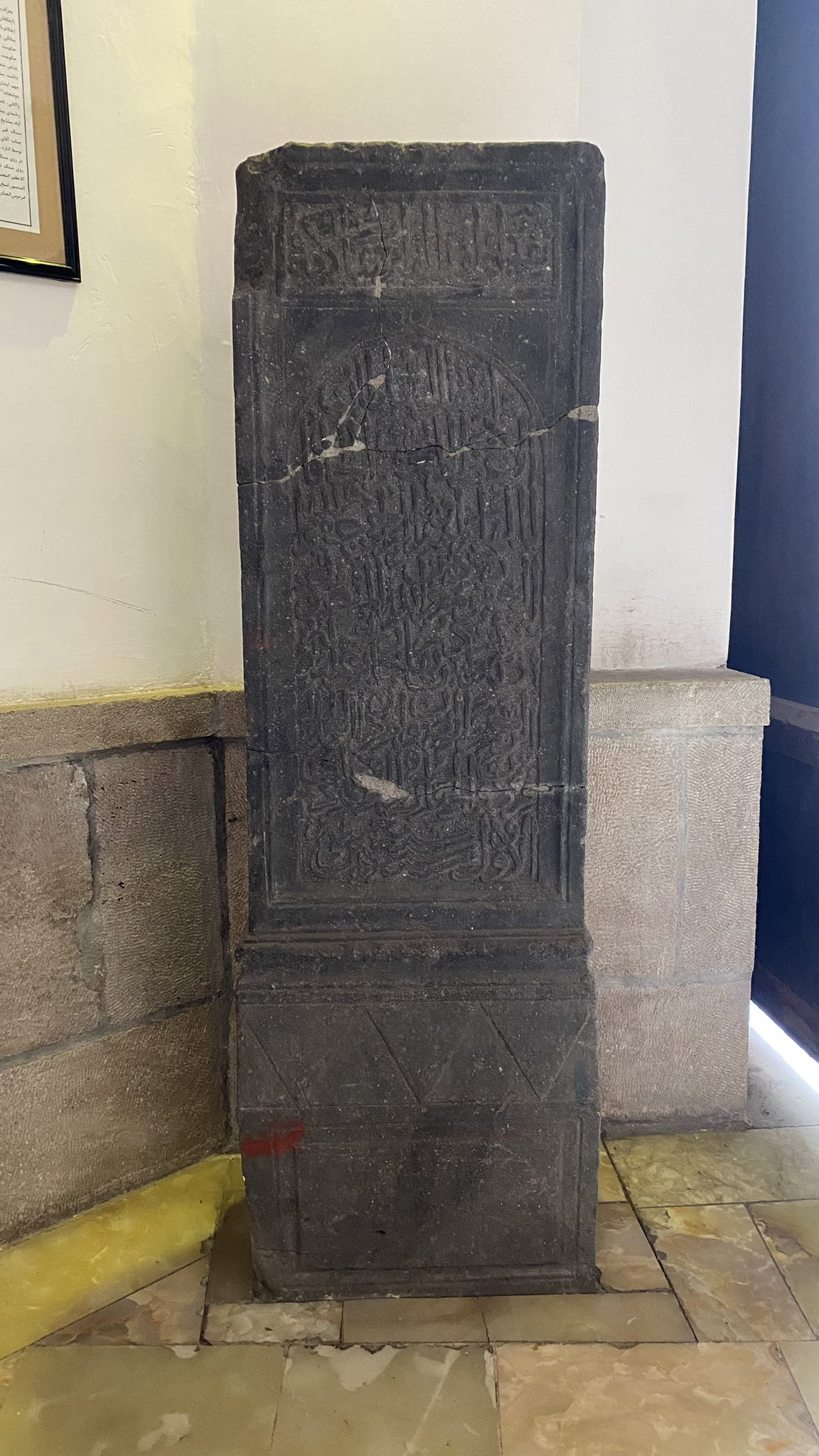
Tombstone of Shaykh Uways located in the Museum of Quran and Manuscripts in Tabriz

He was married to Haji Mama Khatun (d. 1368) with whom he had several children:

- Shaikh Hasan Jalayir (k. October 9, 1374) — married to a daughter of Qadi Shaykh Ali, leading ulama of Tabriz.
- Shaikh Ali Jalayir — Governor of Baghdad
  - Shah Walad Jalayir
    - Sultan Mahmud Jalayir
    - Sultan Awais Jalayir
    - Sultan Muhammad Jalayir
- Shaikh Hussain Jalayir (k. 1382 ) — succeeded as sultan in 1374
- Shaikh Bayazid Jalayir — ruler in Sultaniyeh
- Sultan Ahmed Jalayir (d. 1410) — Governor of Ardabil, succeeded Hussain
  - Ala-du-Daulah Jalayir
    - Hussain bin Ala-ud-Daulah Jalayir
- Tandu Khatun (Disputed)

== Ancestry ==
Ancestors of Shaykh Uways Jalayir

16. Īlgā Jalayir
8. Aq Buqa Jalayir
4. Hussain Gurkan Jalayir
2. Hasan Buzurg
20. Abaqa
10. Arghun
21. Qaitmish Khatun of the Ongud
5. Öljetey
22. Sarija of the Keraits (= 28)
11. Uruk Khatun
1. Shaykh Uways, Jalayirid Sultan
24. Malik of the Suldus
12. Chupan
6. Demasq Kaja
3. Dilshad Khatun
28. Sarija of the Keraits (= 22)
14. Irinjin
7. Tursin Khatun
30. Ahmad Tekuder
15. Konchak Khatun
31. Armini Khatun of the Qongirat

== Sources ==
- Hasanzade, Jamila; Goyushov, Nasib; Vasilyeva, Olga; Yastrebova, Olga (2021). The Magic of the Pen: Selected Miniatures from the Khamsa of Nizami Ganjavi (PDF). Boyut Publishing Group / Ones Media. ISBN 978-9952-8413-5-0.
- Jackson, Peter (1986). "Jalayirids, Muzaffarids and Sarbadars". In Lockhart, Laurence; Jackson, Peter (eds.). The Cambridge History of Iran: The Timurid and Safavid Periods. Vol. 6. Cambridge: Cambridge University Press. pp. 1–42. ISBN 0-521-20094-6.

Preceded by Hasan Buzurg	Jalayirid Ruler; 1356–1374	Succeeded by Shaikh Hasan Jalayir
