= Bayazid (Jalayirids) =

Shaikh Bayazid Jalayir was a Jalayirid ruler of the Persian city of Soltaniyeh in 1382–1384, in opposition to his brother Sultan Ahmed Jalayir.

== Biography ==
Shaikh Bayazid Jalayir was the son of Shaikh Awais Jalayir. In 1382 Bayazid and his brothers Ahmad and Shaikh Ali Jalayir plotted to overthrow their brother Shaikh Hussain Jalayir. Ahmad acted first, advancing from Ardabil to Tabriz and ordered Hussain's execution. Bayazid, who was in Tabriz, barely managed to escape. One of Hussain's amirs, 'Adil Aqa, opposed Ahmad and had Bayazid proclaimed as sultan in Soltaniyeh. In order to secure his position, Ahmad requested the assistance of the Black Sheep Turkmen; they killed Shaikh 'Ali in battle. Ahmad and Bayazid then attempted to form an agreement with each other; Bayazid was to receive the Jalayirid lands in Iraq-i 'Ajam (modern-day western Iran) and Ahmad would receive Azerbaijan, while Iraq-i 'Arab would be split between them. The agreement with the brothers failed to last, however, and Ahmad occupied Baghdad. In 1383 he gained entry into Soltaniyeh. At this point, Shah Shoja of the Muzaffarids of Iran intervened, and a new peace was brokered. Bayazid was confirmed in his possession of 'Iraq-i 'Ajam; 'Adil Aqa then left with Shah Shuja for Shiraz. 'Adil Aqa's departure left Bayazid without his principal ally, however, and in the spring of 1384 he gave up Soltaniyeh to Ahmad.

| Preceded by Shaikh Hussain Jalayir | Jalayirid Ruler (in Soltaniyeh); 1382–1384 | Succeeded by Sultan Ahmed Jalayir |
