= Khamsah of Khvaju Kirmani (British Library, Add 18113) =

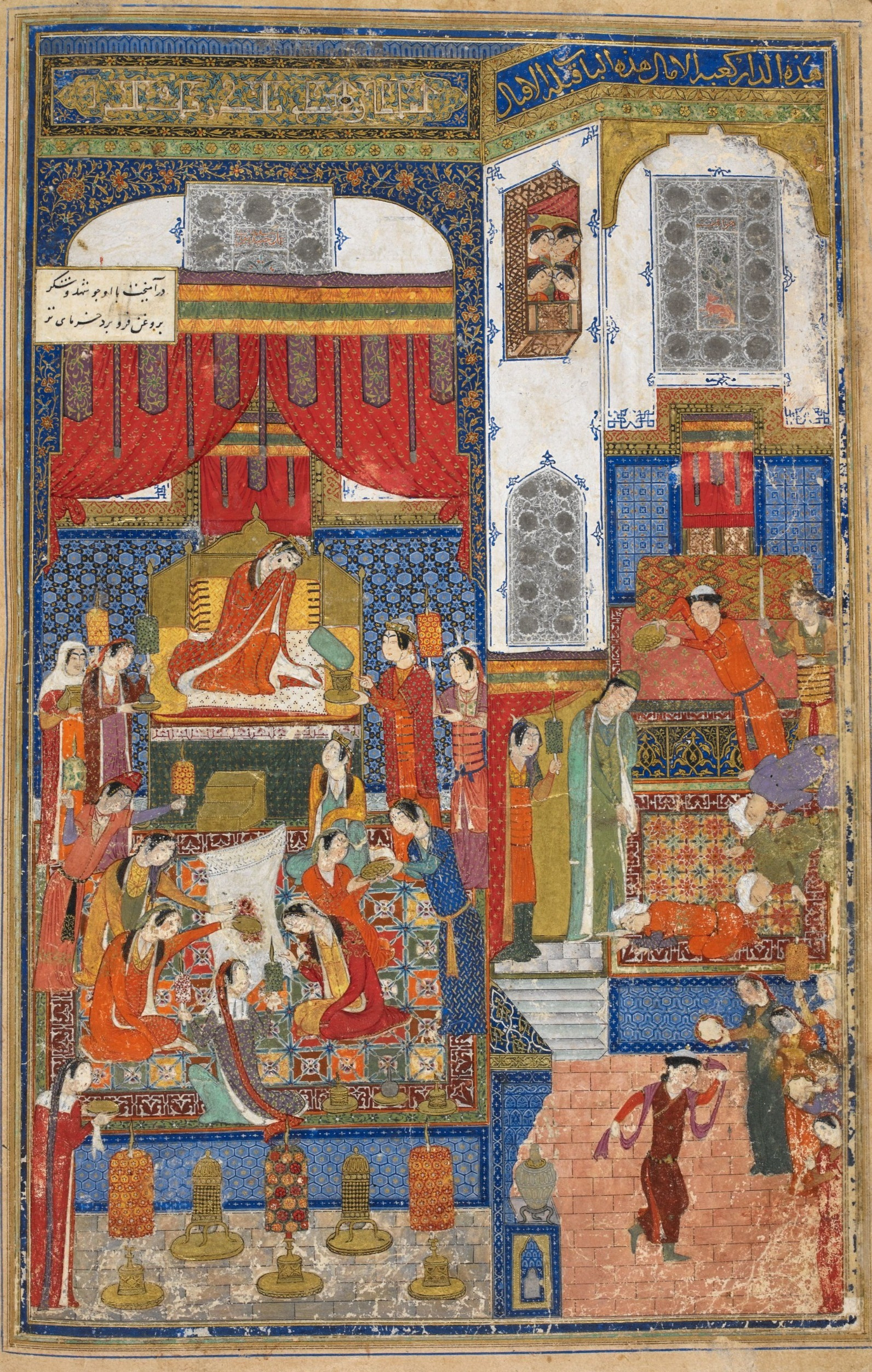
- Likely depiction of an unspecified marriage of Sultan Ahmad Jalayir (shown here leaving the nuptial room) in Baghdad. Painted by Junayd, Khamsah by Khvaju Kirmani (1396, Baghdad).
- Author: Khwaju Kermani
- Illustrator: Junayd
- Language: Persian
- Subject: Romantic stories
- Publication date: 1396
- Publication place: Jalayirid Sultanate
- Media type: Manuscript

The Khamsah of Khvaju Kirmani (British Library, Add 18113) was created in 1396 in Baghdad by the Jalayirids. Although a rather early illustrated manuscript in the Persian language, and following the precursor Khamsa of Nizami (British Library, Or.13297) by about ten years, it already reached some of the highest artistic levels, with full-page romantic art. It has been described as "the most firmly dated illustrated and high-quality Jalayirid manuscript".

This is an illustrated 14th century copy of three of the poems of the Khamsah (خمسه, literally “five” [poems], forming a "Divan" دیوان collection of poems) of the poet Khwaju Kermani (1290–1349). Dated 1396, it was transcribed at the Jalayirid capital Baghdad. Some miniatures contain the signature of the illustrator Junayd, active at the court of the Jalayirid Sultanate in Baghdad circa 1396.

The manuscript was produced for the Jalayirid Sultan Ahmad Jalayir, and is stylistically similar to Khosrow and Shirin (Freer Galery of Art, F1931.29).

A later copy is known, the Humay and Humayun, 1427-1428, Herat (Austrian National Library, N.F. 382), created by the Timurid ruler Baysunghur in Herat. The Timurid miniatures still reflect the style developed by the Jalayirids in Tabriz and Baghdad at the end of the 14th century. The Timurid conquest of these cities led to the transfer of Jalayirid artists and manuscripts to the Timurid courts of Samarkand and Herat, explaining the continuity and improvement of the earlier Jalayirid styles.
