= Shaikh Hussain Jalayir =

Jalayirid ruler

Ahmad Jalayir
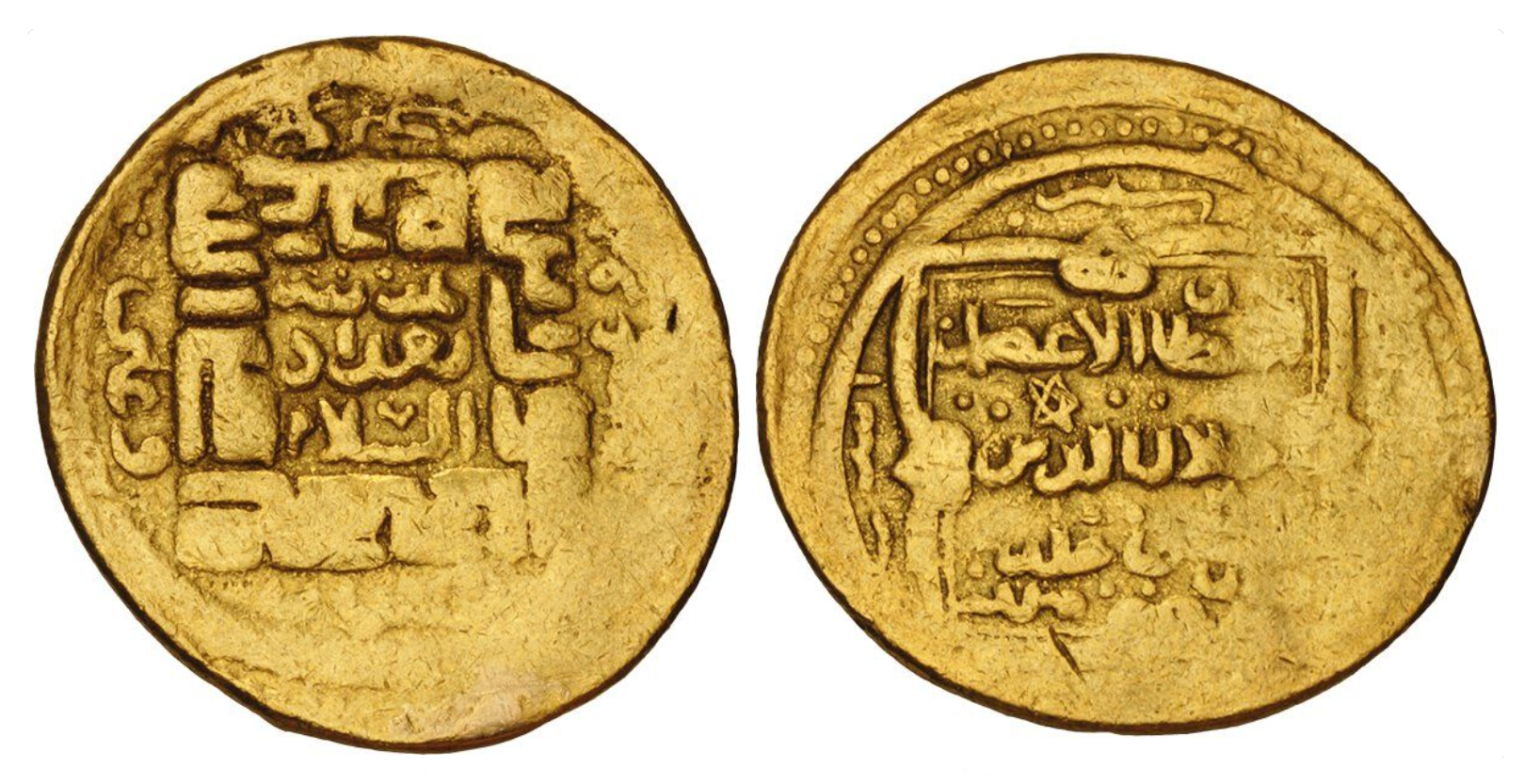
- Coinage of Jalal al-Din Husayn I. Madinat al-Salam Baghdad mint. Dated AH [78]2 (AD 1381/2)

Sultan of the Jalayirids
- Reign: 1374 – 1382
- Predecessor: Shaikh Hasan Jalayir
- Successor: Ahmad Jalayir
- Died: 1382
- Dynasty: Jalayirids
- Father: Shaikh Awais Jalayir
- Religion: Islam

Shaikh Hussain Jalayir (died April or May 1382) was a Jalayirid ruler (1374–1382). He was the son of Shaikh Awais Jalayir.

== Reign (1374–1382) ==
Following the execution of his brother Shaikh Hasan Jalayir, the amirs placed Shaikh Hussain Jalayir on the throne. Almost immediately he had to deal with an invasion by his brother-in-law Shah Mahmud of the Muzaffarids of Iran. Shah Mahmud, who was the son-in-law of Shaikh Awais Jalayir, advanced a claim on Tabriz and took the city. Illness, however, forced him to abandon the region. This was followed by an invasion by the leader of the Muzaffarids, Shah Shuja, but despite taking the city, he was also forced to retreat due to a rebellion in Qazvin. It was only in the summer of 1376 that Shaikh Hussain Jalayir took up residence in Tabriz. In the following spring, he undertook a successful campaign against the Black Sheep Turkmen under Bairam Khwaja, who had been raiding from the west.

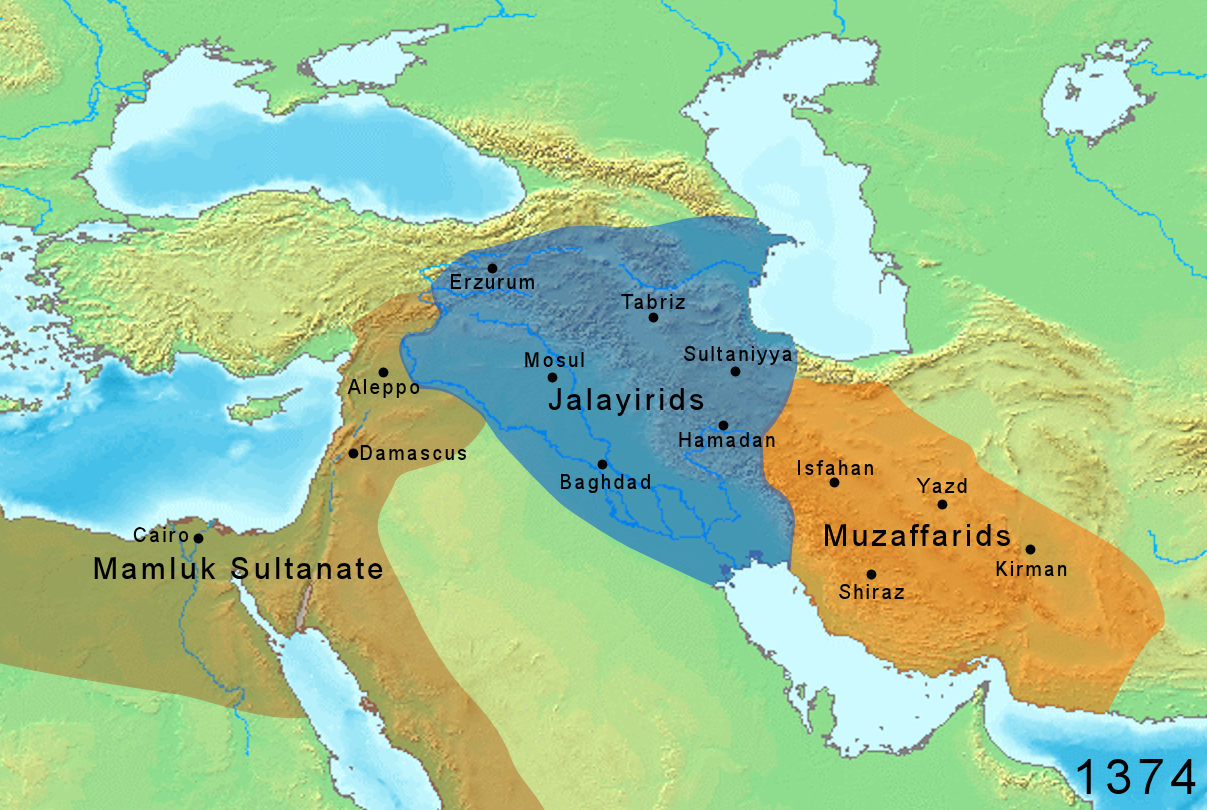
Extent of Jalayirid and Muzaffarid territories in 1374, at the onset of the reign of Ahmad Jalayir

Shaikh Hussain Jalayir's reign was marred by conflict with his surviving brothers; namely, Shaikh Ali Jalayir, Sultan Ahmed Jalayir, and Shaikh Bayazid Jalayir. Shaikh Hussain Jalayir also lost his popularity among many amirs who disliked his support of the powerful 'Adil Aqa, the governor of Ray. Shaikh Hussain Jalayir was faced with a series of uprisings, hostility among his brothers, and troubles with his external enemies. When 'Adil Aqa turned on him, Shaikh Hussain Jalayir lost his last powerful supporter. Sultan Ahmed Jalayir advanced from Ardabil and occupied Tabriz near the end of April 1382; he ordered Husain's execution. Ahmad would then himself take the throne, but conflict between him and 'Adil Aqa and Bayazid meant that the state fell into a period of disunity.

== Art of the book ==
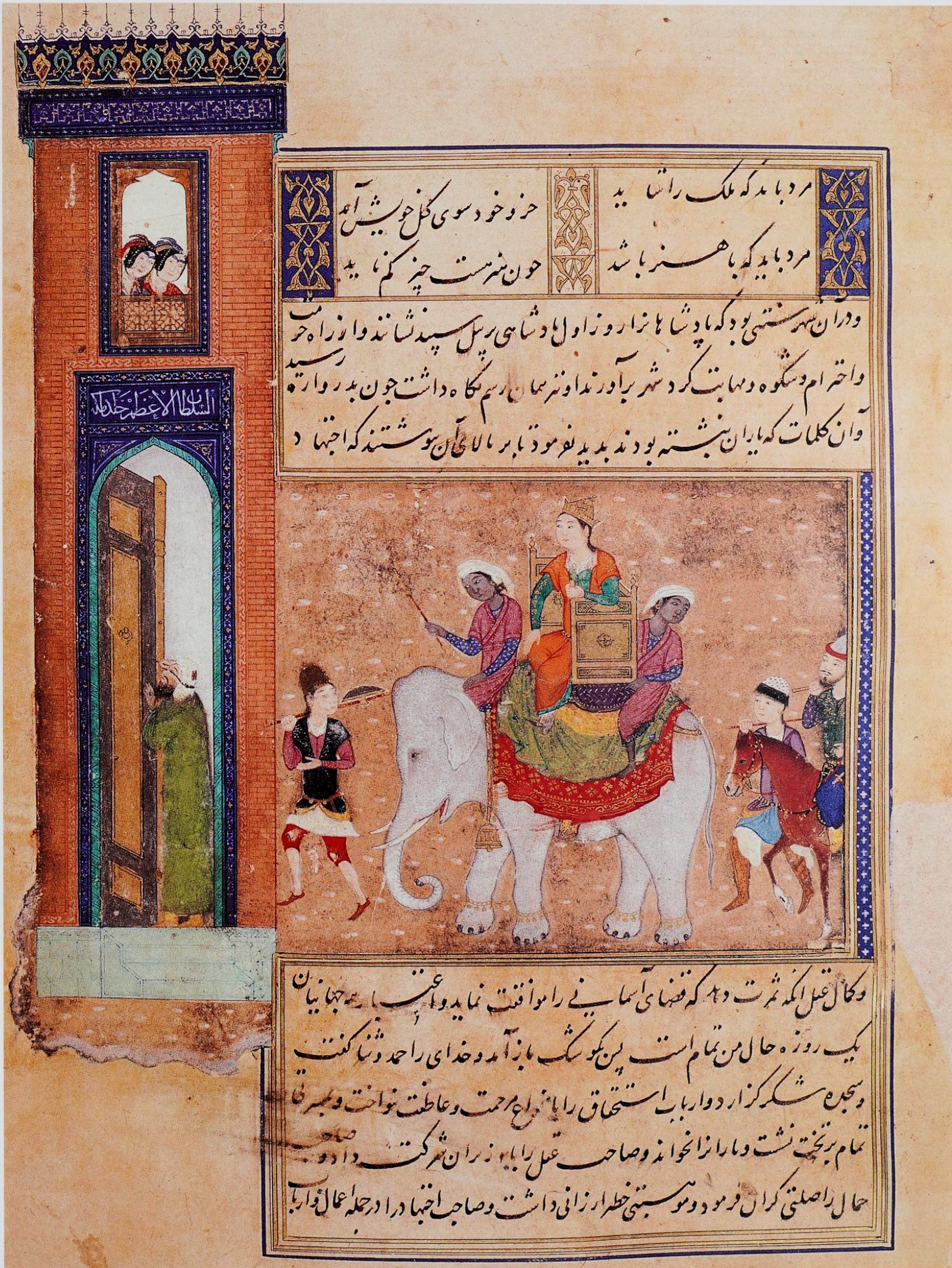
A contemporary Jalayirid manuscript: "The New King Paraded around the Town on a White Elephant", Kalila and Dimna, 1375-1385, Tabriz. Topkaki Saray Museum, H.362

The capital city of Tabriz developed a strong and highly sophisticated miniature tradition from the time of the Turco-Mongol Jalayirid Sultanate. Historically, the Tabriz school of miniatures was founded in the 14th century (before the Shiraz and Herat schools), and was based on the Mongol Ilkhanid and Uighur pictorial traditions. Tabriz was the center of origin of the kitabkhana system of ateliers, which then spread through the Orient at a scale comparable to the European Renaissance.

The creations of Tabriz in the 14th century under Shaikh Hussain Jalayir can be seen in exquisite works such as a Kalila and Dimna (MS Topkaki H.362) created in Tabriz in 1375-1385.

Preceded by Shaikh Hasan Jalayir	Jalayirid Ruler; 1374–1382	Succeeded by Sultan Ahmed Jalayir
