= Junayd (illustrator) =

Junayd Baghdadi
(جنيد)

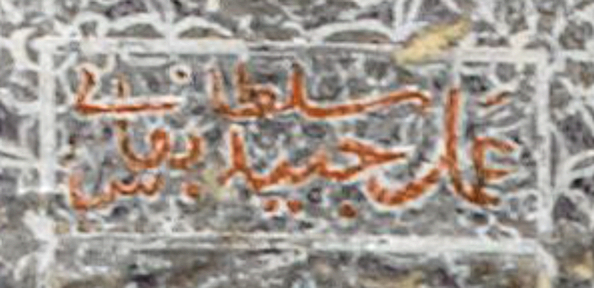
Signature of Junayd (’amal-i Junayd-i Baghdādī) in the Khamsah of Khvaju Kirmani (British Library, Add 18113), 1396, Baghdad.

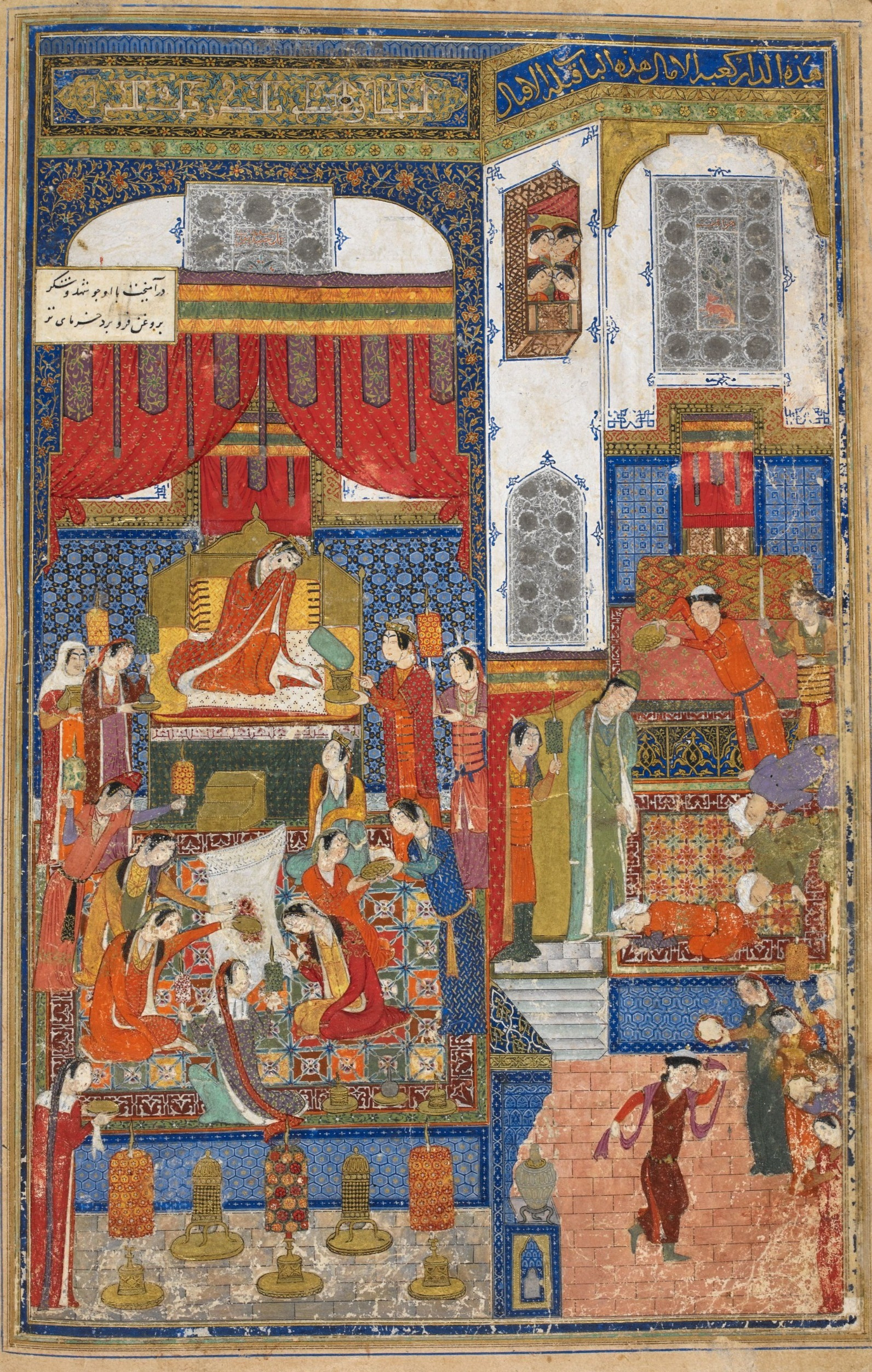
The signature of Junayd appears in the grisaille window over the throne of Humayun. Folio 45, Khamsah of Khvaju Kirmani (British Library, Add 18113), 1396.

Junayd Baghdadi (Persian: جُنیدِ بَغدادی; circa 1396) was a 14th-century illustrator and a royal painter (naqqash-i sultani) at the time of the Jalayirid Sultanate in Baghdad. He was named a student of Shams al-Din by Dust Muhammad.

He is known as the illustrator for the Divan of Khvaju Kirmani, published in 1396 in Baghdad. This manuscript is "the most firmly dated illustrated and high-quality Jalayirid manuscript". One of the paintings was signed by Junayd himself. He may also have been the illustrator of the paintings in Freer Divan's paintings.

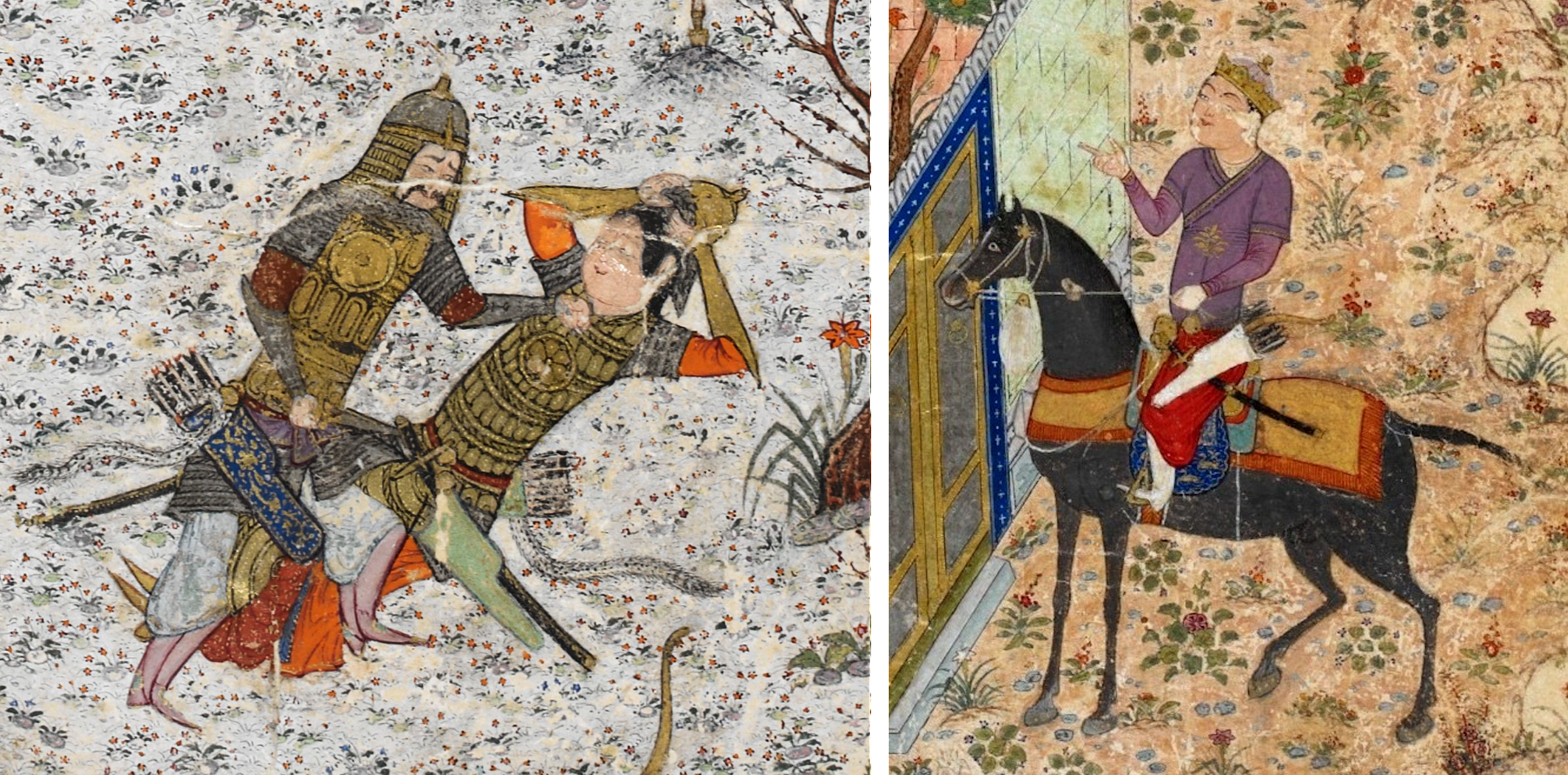
Divan of Khvaju Kirmani, illustrations by Junaid (1396, detail)

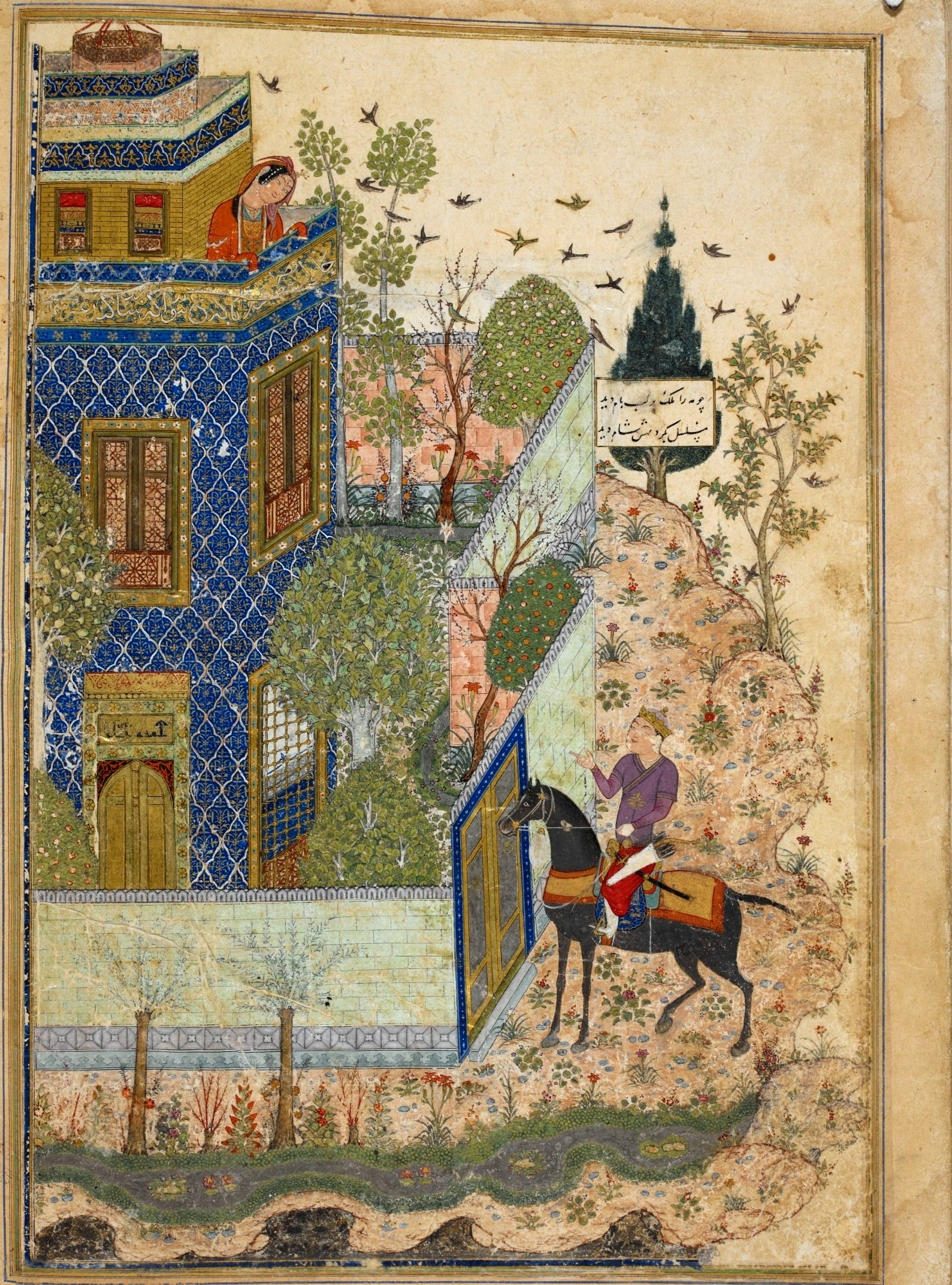
Folio 18.

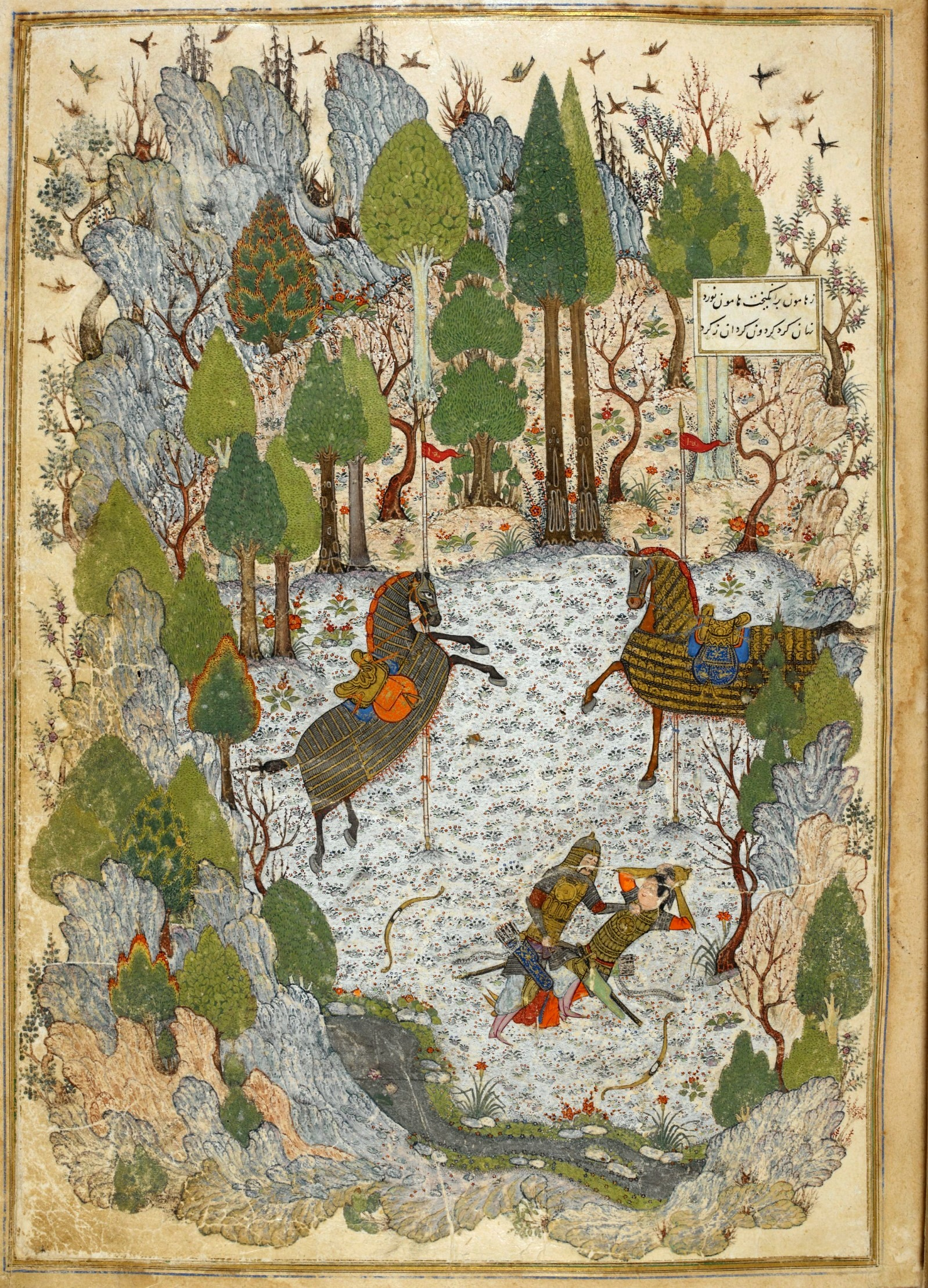
Folio 23.
