= Darband, East Azerbaijan =

Darband دربند
- Village
- Location within Iran
- Coordinates: 37°27′51″N 46°46′04″E
- Country: Iran
- Province: East Azerbaijan
- County: Hashtrud
- Bakhsh: Central
- Rural District: Qaranqu

Population (2006)
  - Total: 239
- Time zone: UTC+3:30 (IRST)
  - Summer (DST): UTC+4:30 (IRDT)

Darband (Persian: دربند) is a village in Qaranqu Rural District, in the Central District of Hashtrud County, East Azerbaijan Province, Iran. At the 2006 census, its population was 239, in 46 families.
