= Shaikh Hasan Jalayir =

Jalayirid ruler of Iraq

Sultan of the Jalayirids
- Reign: 1374 (1 day)
- Predecessor: Shaykh Uways Jalayir
- Successor: Shaikh Hussain Jalayir
- Died: 1374
- Dynasty: Jalayirids
- Father: Shaikh Awais Jalayir
- Religion: Islam

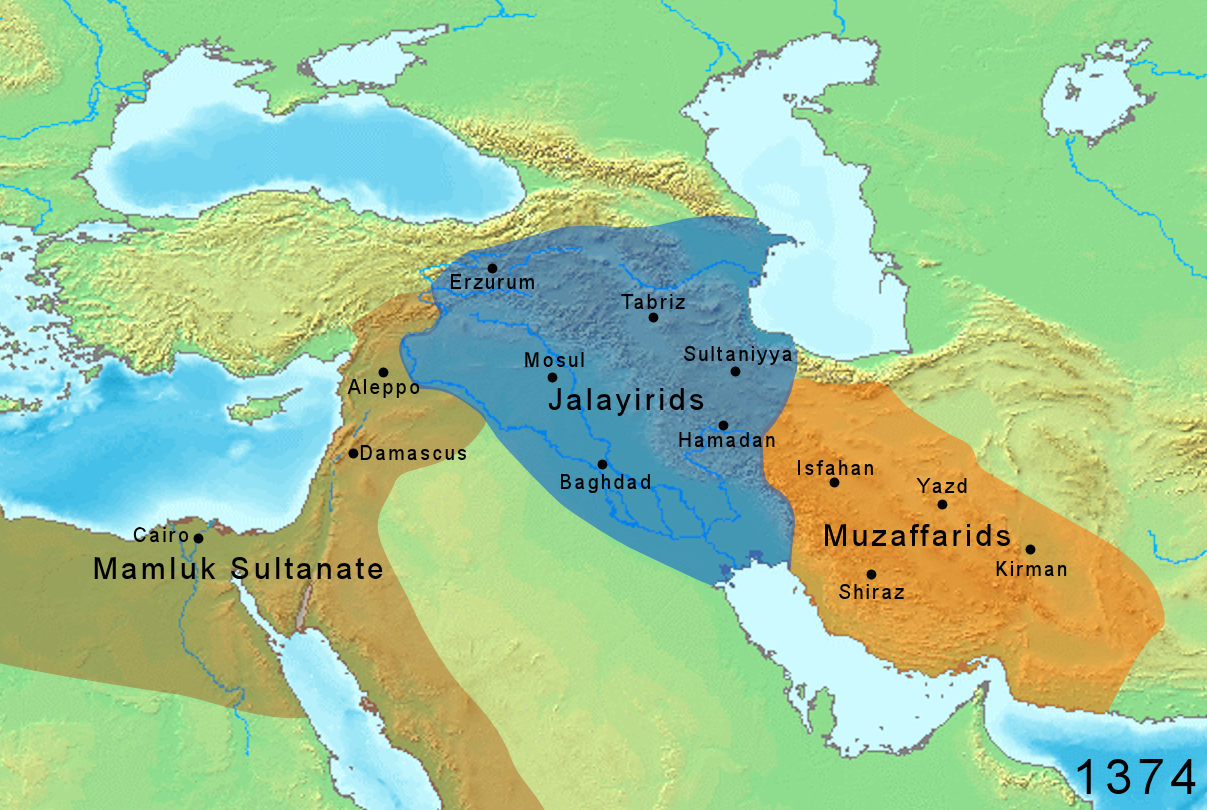
Extent of Jalayirid and Muzaffarid territories in 1374

Shaikh Hasan Jalayir (died October 9, 1374) was briefly Jalayirid ruler for one day. He was the eldest son of Shaikh Uways Jalayir. After his father died, Hasan succeeded him, but was immediately executed by his amirs (umara), who then put his brother Husain on the throne.

His father-in-law Qadi Shaykh Ali, leading ulama of Tabriz, protested this and was exiled to Damascus.

== Litrature ==
- Peter Jackson (1986). The Cambridge History of Iran, Volume Six: The Timurid and Safavid Periods. ISBN 0-521-20094-6
- Edward G. Browne (1926). A Literary History of Persia: The Tartar Dominion. ISBN 0-936347-66-X

Preceded by Shaikh Awais Jalayir	Jalayirid Ruler; 1374	Succeeded by Shaikh Hussain Jalayir
