= Kitab Khana =

Bookshop in Mumbai

Coordinates: 18.932388°N 72.832392°E

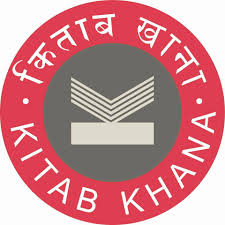
- Industry: Bookshop
- Founded: 2010
- Headquarters: Mumbai, India
- Number of locations: 1
- Key people: Amrita and Samir Somaiya
- Owner: Somaiya Group
- Website: www.kitabkhana.in

Kitab Khana (Hindi; literally "home for books") is an independent bookshop that was founded in 2010 inside Somaiya Bhavan, a 150-year-old building in Fort, Mumbai, India. It also is the one and only British Council Library of Southern Bombay as it is known for its elegant style and display The colonial-style structure with high ceilings and Corinthian columns often draws attention for its "old-world charm", even though the construction is recent. It has been called "India's most beautiful bookshop". The store is spread over two floors and has an in-house cafe. The shop has a wide collection of world literature, classics, and regional Indian literature in many languages, including Hindi, Marathi and Urdu In 2021, Financial Times included the shop in a list of "the most brilliant bookshops in the world".

== Gallery ==
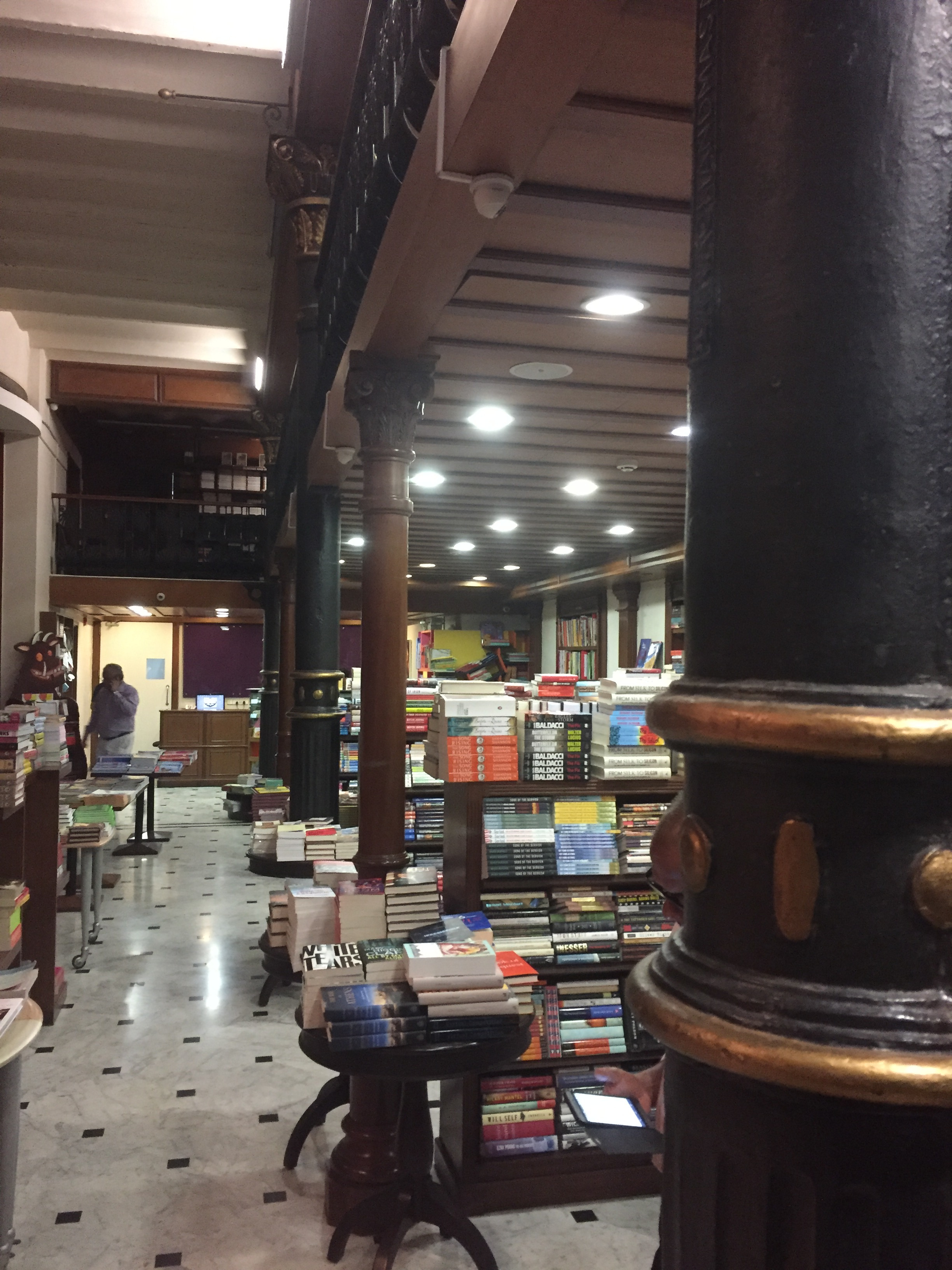
The Corinthian columns inside the bookshop

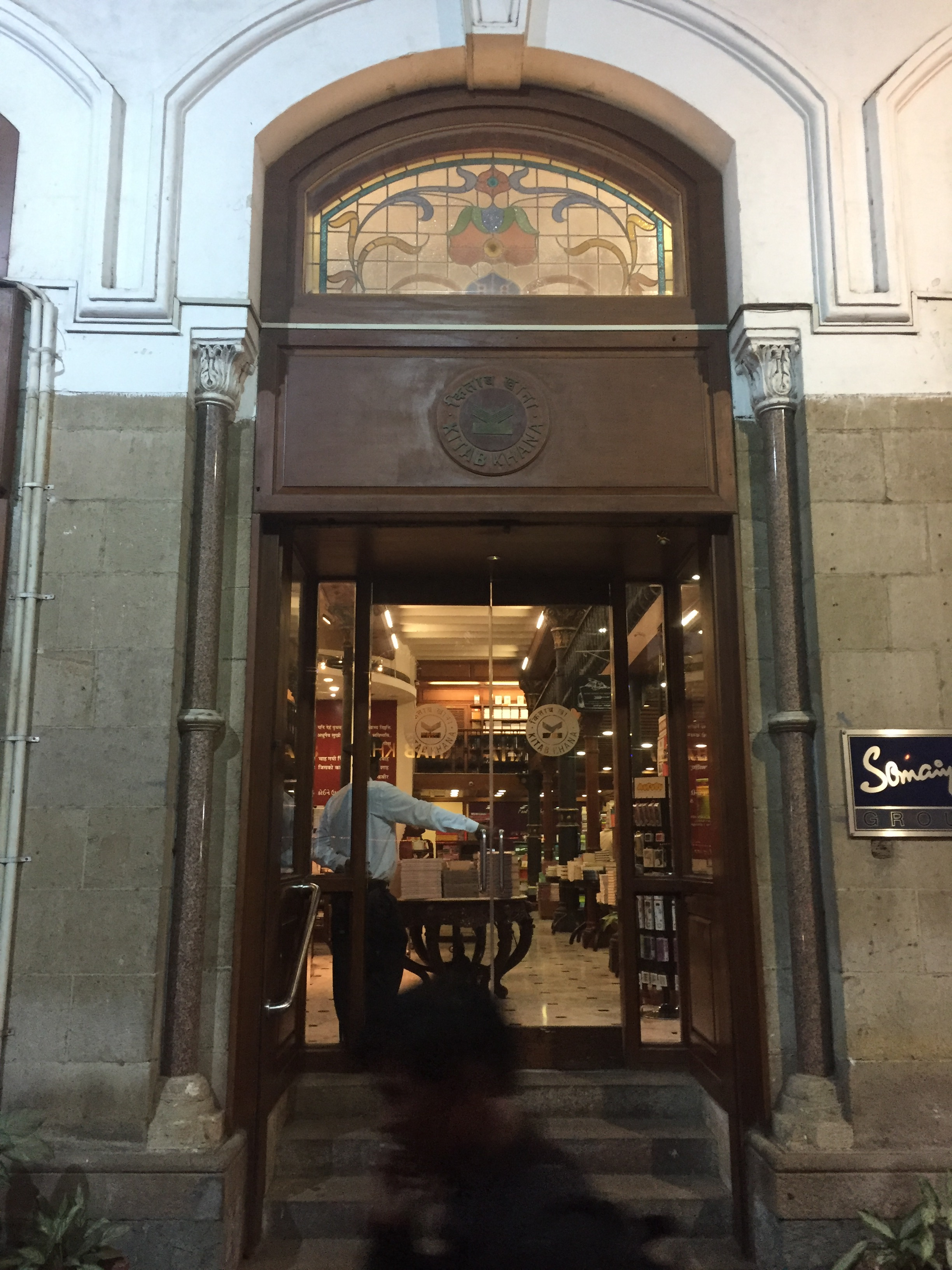
The store entrance
