= Tahereh Vahedian =

Iranian Painter, Sculptor, and Installation Artist

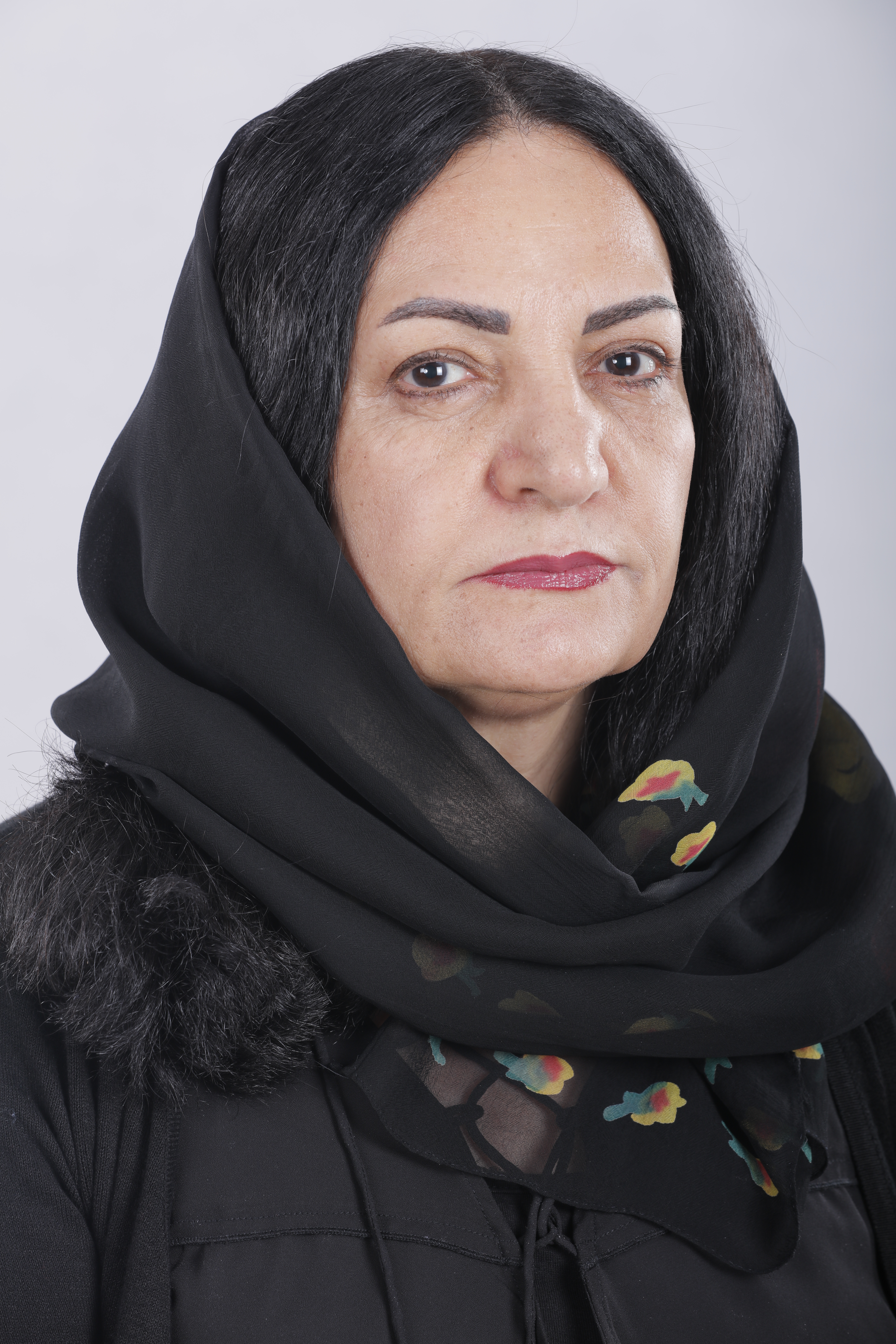
- Education: Iran’s Association of Visual Arts
- Notable work: Blue Mirror Collection
- Awards: Second highest certificate of qualification in painting from the Evaluation Council of Artists, Writers and Poets of Iran.
- Website: taherehvahedian.com

Tahereh Vahedian (Persian: طاهره واحدیان) is an Iranian visual artist working in painting, sculpture, and installation art. She has exhibited her work in galleries and cultural institutions in Iran and internationally, including in the United States and Germany.

== Early life and education ==
Vahedian studied painting at the Iran's Association of Visual Arts, graduating with honors. She later received the second highest certificate of qualification in painting from the Evaluation Council of Artists, Writers and Poets of Iran.

== Career ==
In addition to her artistic practice, Vahedian has worked as a lecturer at the Ferdows Institute of Higher Education in Mashhad. She is the founder of Vahedian's Centre for Visual Arts. She has also served as a juror and mentor for visual arts festivals and exhibitions in Iran.

== Artistic style ==
Vahedian's work is characterized by a combination of figurative and abstract elements, often structured through layered compositions and mixed media techniques. She frequently employs acrylic and ink-based materials to create textured surfaces in which multiple visual planes coexist.

A recurring focus in her work is the representation of female figures, often depicted in stylized or symbolic forms, addressing themes of identity, self-expression, and the social conditions of women in contemporary Iranian society.

Her compositions commonly incorporate multiple perspectives within a single frame, presenting simultaneous viewpoints. This approach has been associated with both contemporary visual culture and elements of Persian miniature painting.

Her later works also incorporate conceptual approaches, combining symbolic motifs and architectural forms to explore themes of memory, time, and perception.

== Selected exhibitions ==
2024: Rat Gallery, Washington DC, The United States

2021: ‘Modern Art’, Fajr Festival, Mashhad, Iran

2018: ‘Iran Avant-garde Artists’, KHP Ateliers and Kulturzentrum D-mitte, Düsseldorf, Germany, Feb 23 – March 18

2013: ‘Blue Mirror’, Iranian Artists’ Forum, Tehran, Iran

2012: ‘Cultural Exchange Program of Iran and India’, Iranian Artists’ Forum, Tehran, Iran

2012: Golestan Gallery, Tehran, Iran

2008: Turkmenistan's International Exhibition and World's Masterpieces, Ashgabat, Turkmenistan

== Notable Collections ==
2003: 'Save Me in Your Dreams'

2017: 'Barcode'

2015-2016: 'Noise'

2013-2017: 'Blue Mirror'

2007: 'Grey'
