= Persian miniature =

Small Persian painting on paper

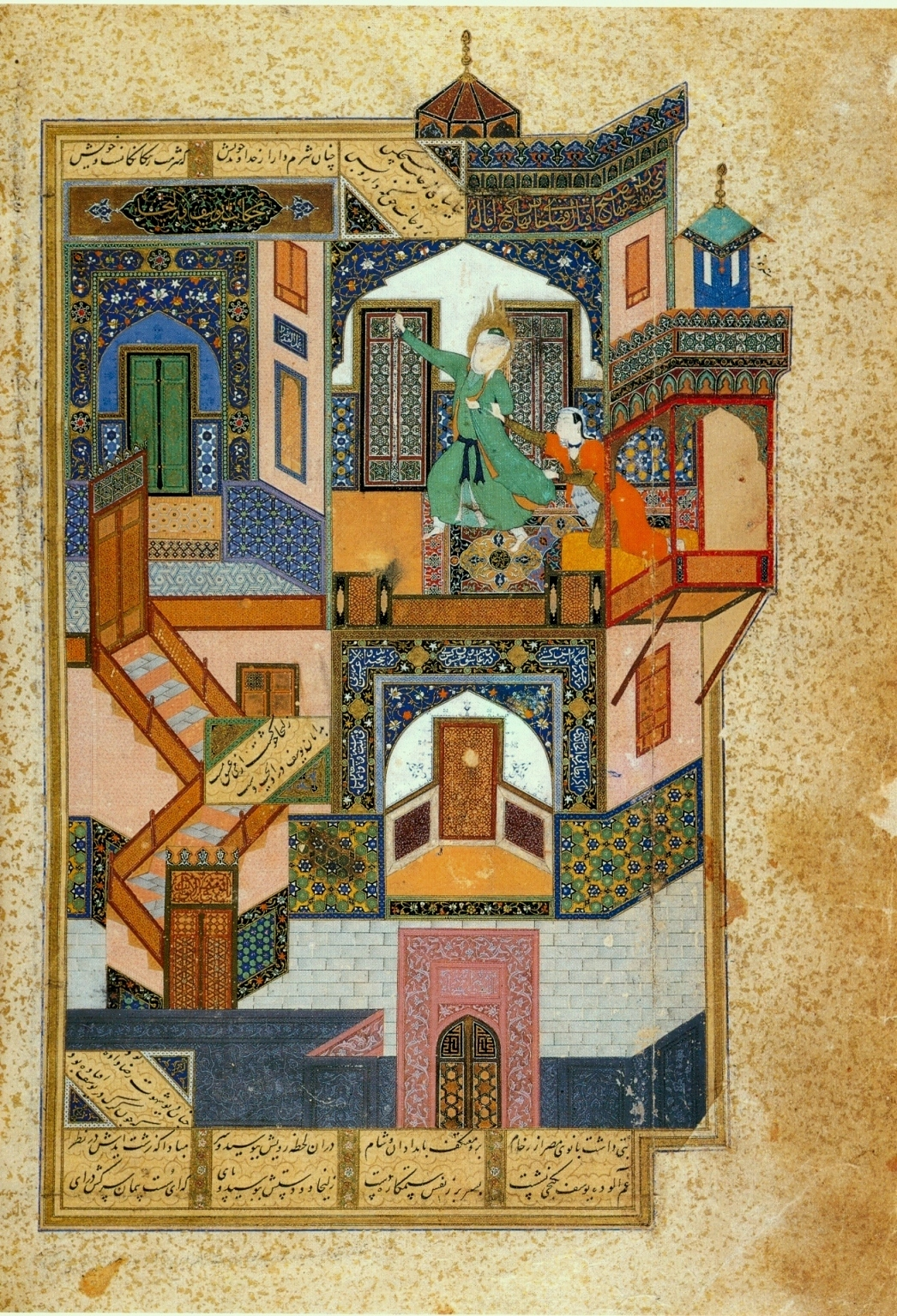
Yusuf and Zulaikha (Joseph chased by Potiphar's wife), by Behzād. Bustan of Sa'di, Herat, 1488, created for Timurid ruler Sultan Husayn Bayqara

A Persian miniature (Persian: نگارگری ایرانی, romanized: negârgari-ye Irâni) is a small Persian painting on paper, whether a book illustration or a separate work of art intended to be kept in an album of such works called a muraqqa. The techniques are broadly comparable to the Western Medieval and Byzantine traditions of miniatures in illuminated manuscripts.

Although there is an equally well-established Persian tradition of wall-painting, the survival rate and state of preservation of miniatures is better, and miniatures are much the best-known form of Persian painting in the West, and many of the most important examples are in Western, or Turkish, museums. Miniature painting became a significant genre in Persian art in the 13th century, receiving Chinese influence after the Mongol conquests, and the highest point in the tradition was reached in the 15th and 16th centuries. The tradition continued, under some Western influence, after this, and has many modern exponents. The Persian miniature was the dominant influence on other Islamic miniature traditions, principally the Ottoman miniature in Turkey, and the Mughal miniature in the Indian subcontinent.

Persian art under Islam had never completely forbidden the human figure, and in the miniature tradition the depiction of figures, often in large numbers, is central. This was partly because the miniature is a private form, kept in a book or album and only shown to those the owner chooses. It was therefore possible to be more free than in wall paintings or other works seen by a wider audience. The Quran and other purely religious works are not known to have been illustrated in this way, though histories and other works of literature may include religiously related scenes, including those depicting the Islamic prophet Muhammad, after 1500 usually without showing his face.

As well as the figurative scenes in miniatures, which this article concentrates on, there was a parallel style of non-figurative ornamental decoration which was found in borders and panels in miniature pages, and spaces at the start or end of a work or section, and often in whole pages acting as frontispieces. In Islamic art this is referred to as "illumination", and manuscripts of the Quran and other religious books often included considerable number of illuminated pages. The designs reflected contemporary work in other media, in later periods being especially close to book-covers and Persian carpets, and it is thought that many carpet designs were created by court artists and sent to the workshops in the provinces.

In later periods miniatures were increasingly created as single works to be included in albums called muraqqa, rather than illustrated books. This allowed non-royal collectors to afford a representative sample of works from different styles and periods.

== Style ==
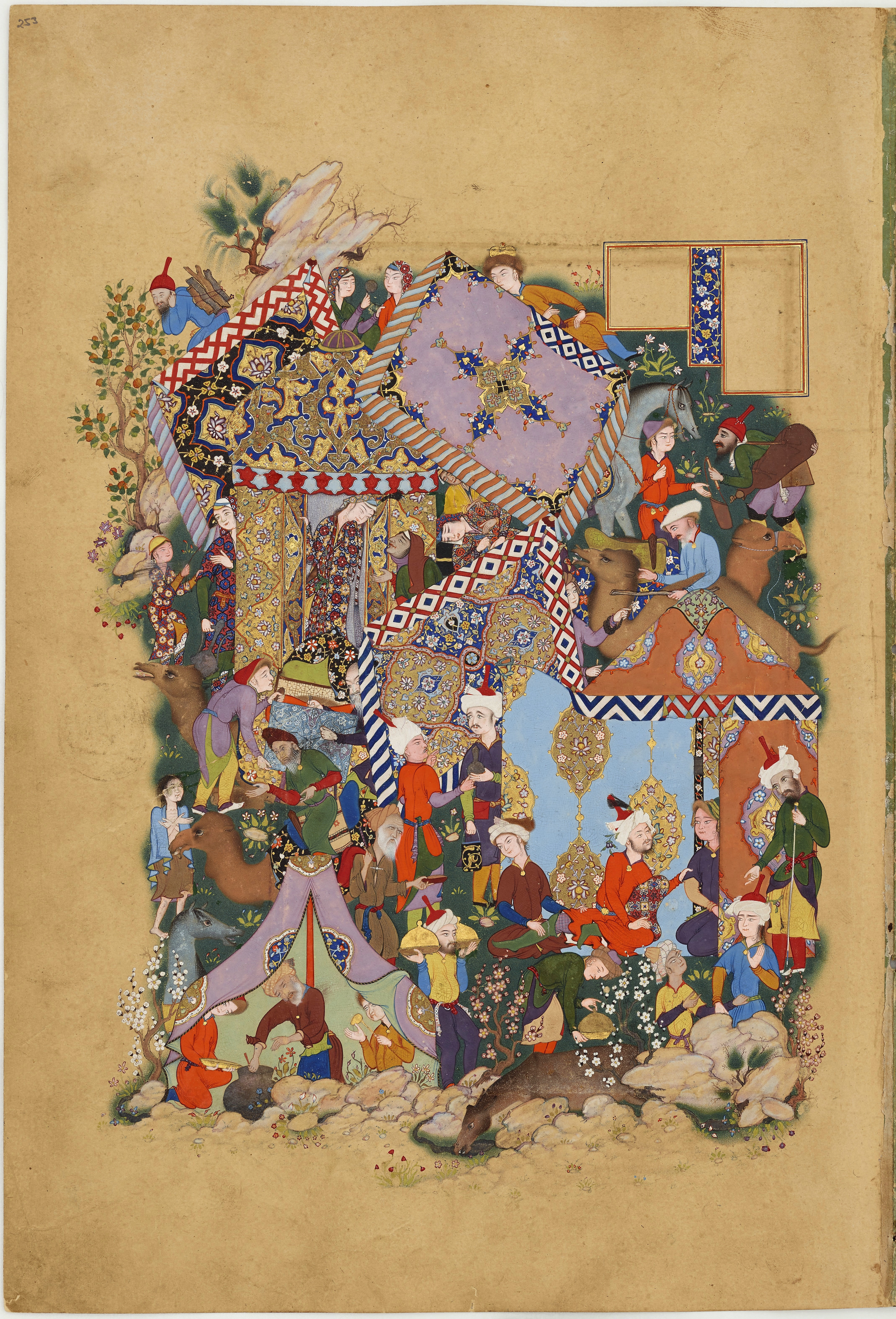
Camp scene from late in the classic period, with no frame (c. 1556-1565), Freer Gallery of Art, Washington, D.C.; Majnun (at top wearing orange) spies on his beloved Layla (standing in tent doorway).

The bright and pure colouring of the Persian miniature is one of its most striking features. Normally all the pigments used are mineral-based ones which keep their bright colours very well if kept in proper conditions, the main exception being silver, mostly used to depict water, which will oxidize to a rough-edged black over time. The conventions of Persian miniatures changed slowly; faces are normally youthful and seen in three-quarters view, with a plump rounded lower face better suited to portraying typical Central Asian or Chinese features than those of most Persians. Lighting is even, without shadows or chiaroscuro. Walls and other surfaces are shown either frontally, or as at (to modern eyes) an angle of about 45 degrees, often giving the modern viewer the unintended impression that a building is (say) hexagonal in plan. Buildings are often shown in complex views, mixing interior views through windows or "cutaways" with exterior views of other parts of a facade. Costumes and architecture are always those of the time.

Many figures are often depicted, with those in the main scene normally rendered at the same size, and recession (depth in the picture space) indicated by placing more distant figures higher up in the space. More important figures may be somewhat larger than those around them, and battle scenes can be very crowded indeed. Great attention is paid to the background, whether of a landscape or buildings, and the detail and freshness with which plants and animals, the fabrics of tents, hangings or carpets, or tile patterns are shown is one of the great attractions of the form. The dress of figures is equally shown with great care, although artists understandably often avoid depicting the patterned cloth that many would have worn. Animals, especially the horses that very often appear, are mostly shown sideways on; even the love-stories that constitute much of the classic material illustrated are conducted largely in the saddle, as far as the prince-protagonist is concerned. Landscapes are very often mountainous (the plains that make up much of Persia are rarely attempted), this being indicated by a high undulating horizon, and outcrops of bare rock which, like the clouds in the normally small area of sky left above the landscape, are depicted in conventions derived from Chinese art. Even when a scene in a palace is shown, the viewpoint often appears to be from a point some metres in the air.

The earliest miniatures appeared unframed horizontally across the page in the middle of text, following Byzantine and Arabic precedents, but in the 14th century the vertical format was introduced, perhaps influenced by Chinese scroll-paintings. This is used in all the luxury manuscripts for the court that constitute the most famous Persian manuscripts, and the vertical format dictates many characteristics of the style.

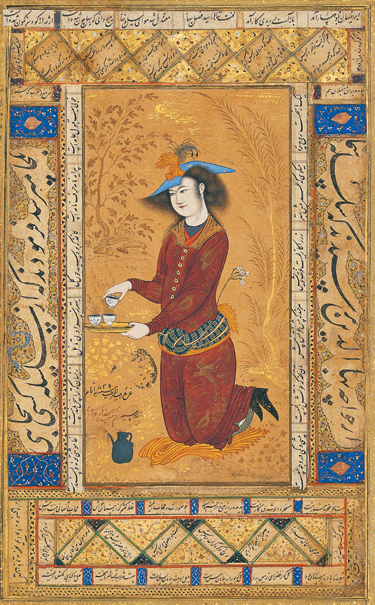
Saki, album miniature by Reza Abbasi, 1609

The miniatures normally occupy a full page, later sometimes spreading across two pages to regain a square or horizontal "landscape" format. There are often panels of text or captions inside the picture area, which is enclosed in a frame, eventually of several ruled lines with a broader band of gold or colour. The rest of the page is often decorated with dense designs of plants and animals in a muted grisaille, often gold and brown; text pages without miniatures often also have such borders. In later manuscripts, elements of the miniature begin to expand beyond the frame, which may disappear on one side of the image, or be omitted completely.

Another later development was the album miniature, conceived as a single picture rather than a book illustration, though such images may be accompanied by short lyric poems. The withdrawal of Shah Tahmasp I from commissioning illustrated books in the 1540s probably encouraged artists to transfer to these cheaper works for a wider circle of patrons. Albums or muraqqas were assembled by collectors with album miniatures, specimen pages of calligraphy, and miniatures taken from older books, to which border paintings were often added when they were remounted. Album miniatures usually showed a few figures on a larger scale, with less attention to the background, and tended to become drawings with some tints of coloured wash, rather than fully painted.

In the example at right the clothes are fully painted, and the background uses the gold grisaille style earlier reserved for marginal decoration, as in the miniature at the head of the article. Many were individual portraits, either of notable figures (but initially rarely portraits of rulers), or of idealized beautiful youths. Others were scenes of lovers in a garden or picnics. From about the middle of the 16th century these types of images became dominant, but they gradually declined in quality and originality and tended towards conventional prettiness and sentimentality.

Books were sometimes refurbished and added to after an interval of many years, adding or partly repainting miniatures, changing the border decoration, and making other changes, not all improvements. The Conference of the Birds miniature in the gallery below is an addition of 1600 to a manuscript of over a century earlier, and elements of the style appear to represent an effort to match the earlier miniatures in the book. The famous painting Princes of the House of Timur was first painted in 1550-55 in Persia for the exiled Mughal prince Humayun, who largely began the Mughal miniature tradition by taking back Persian miniaturists when he gained the throne. It was then twice updated in India (c.1605 and 1628) to show later generations of the royal house. The dimensions of the manuscripts covered a range not dissimilar to typical modern books, though with a more vertical ratio; many were as small as a modern paperback, others larger. Shah Tamasp's Shahnameh stood 47 cm high, and one exceptional Shahnameh from Tabriz of c. 1585 stood 53 cm high.

== Artists and technique ==
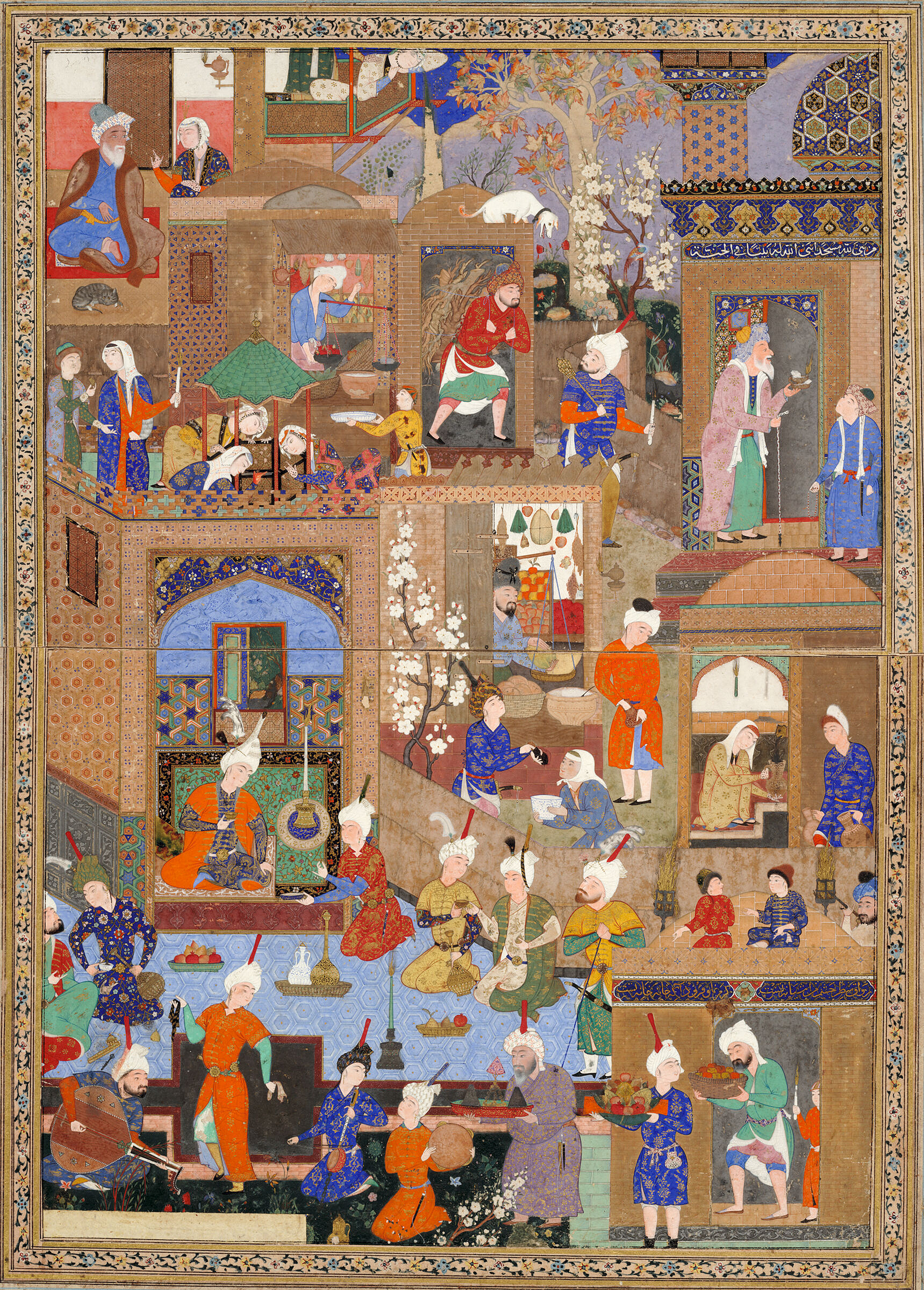
Nighttime in a City: urban activity in the Safavid capital of Tabriz, painted circa 1540 for Shah Tahmasp (Sackler Museum, 1958.76).

In the classic period artists were exclusively male, and normally grouped in workshops, of which the royal workshop (not necessarily in a single building) was much the most prestigious, recruiting talented artists from the bazaar workshops in the major cities. However the nature of the royal workshop remains unclear, as some manuscripts are recorded as being worked on in different cities, rulers often took artists with them on their travels, and at least some artists were able to work on private commissions. As in Europe, sons very often followed their father into the workshop, but boys showing talent from any background might be recruited; at least one notable painter was born a slave. There were some highly placed amateur artists, including Shah Tahmasp I (reigned 1524–1576), who was also one of the greatest patrons of miniatures. Persian artists were highly sought after by other Islamic courts, especially those of the Ottoman and Mughal Empires, whose own traditions of miniature were based on Persian painting but developed rather different styles.

The work was often divided between the main painter, who drew the outlines, and less senior painters who coloured in the drawing. In Mughal miniatures at least, a third artist might do just the faces. Then there might be the border paintings; in most books using them these are by far the largest area of painted material as they occur on text pages as well. The miniatures in a book were often divided up between different artists, so that the best manuscripts represent an overview of the finest work of the period. The scribes or calligraphers were normally different people, on the whole regarded as having a rather higher status than the artists - their names are more likely to be noted in the manuscript.

Royal librarians probably played a significant role in managing the commissions; the extent of direct involvement by the ruler himself is normally unclear. The scribes wrote the main text first, leaving spaces for the miniatures, presumably having made a plan for these with the artist and the librarian. The book covers were also richly decorated for luxury manuscripts, and when they too have figurative scenes these presumably used drawings by the same artists who created the miniatures. Paper was the normal material for the pages, unlike the vellum normally used in Europe for as long as the illuminated manuscript tradition lasted. The paper was highly polished, and when not given painted borders might be flecked with gold leaf.

A unique survival from the Timurid period, found "pasted inconspicuously" in a muraqqa in the Topkapi Palace is thought to be a report to Baysunghur from his librarian. After a brief and high-flown introduction, "Petition from the most humble servants of the royal library, whose eyes are as expectant of the dust from the hooves of the regal steed as the ears of those who fast are for the cry of Allahu akbar ..." it continues with very businesslike and detailed notes on what each of some twenty-five named artists, scribes and craftsmen has been up to over a period of perhaps a week: "Amir Khalil has finished the waves in two sea-scenes of the Gulistan and will begin to apply colour. ... All the painters are working on painting and tinting seventy-five tent-poles .... Mawlana Ali is designing a frontispiece illumination for the Shahnama. His eyes were sore for a few days." Apart from book arts, designs for tent-makers, tile-makers, woodwork and a saddle are mentioned, as is the progress of the "begim's little chest".

== History ==
The ancient Persian religion of Manichaeism made considerable use of images; not only was the founding prophet Mani (c.216–276) a professional artist, at least according to later Islamic tradition, but one of the sacred books of the religion, the Arzhang, was illustrated by the prophet himself, whose illustrations (probably essentially cosmological diagrams rather than images with figures) were regarded as part of the sacred material and always copied with the text. Unfortunately, the religion was repressed strongly from the Sasanian era and onwards so that only tiny fragments of Manichean art survive. These no doubt influenced the continuing Persian tradition, but little can be said about how. It is also known that Sasanian palaces had wall-paintings, but only fragments of these have survived.

There are narrative scenes in pottery (Mina'i ceramics), though it is hard to judge how these relate to lost contemporary book painting. Recent scholarship has noted that, although surviving early examples are now uncommon, human figurative art was also a continuous tradition in Islamic lands in secular contexts (such as literature, science, and history); as early as the 9th century, such art flourished during the Abbasid Caliphate (c. 749-1258, across Spain, North Africa, Egypt, Syria, Turkey, Mesopotamia, and Persia).

=== Earliest illustrated manuscript in Persian (c.1250) ===
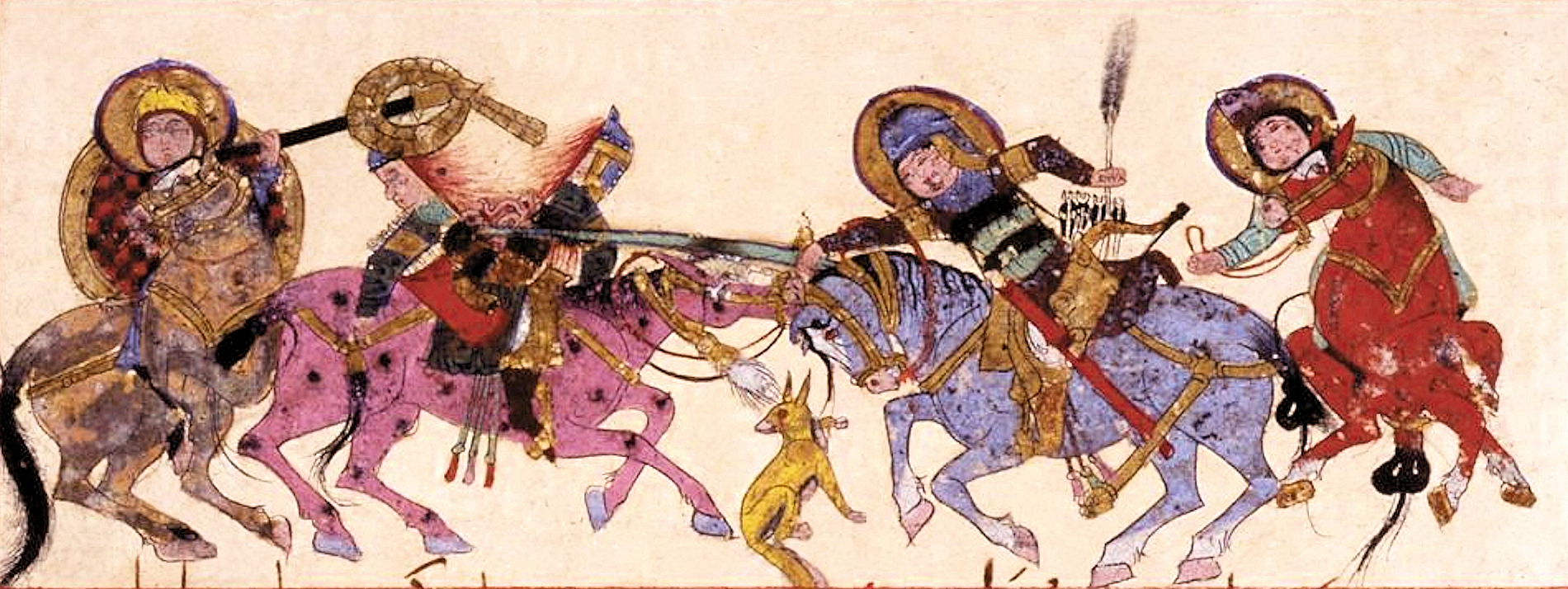
Rabī cuts his adversary in half. Battle scene, in Varka and Golshah, mid-13th century Seljuk Anatolia.

The great period of the Persian miniature began when Persia was ruled by a succession of foreign dynasties, who came from the east and north. Before the Mongol Ilkhanate (1253–1353), narrative representations are only known in Persia in architecture and ceramics. With the large tradition of Arabic manuscripts in the 12th-13th centuries, illustrated manuscripts probably also existed in Persia, but none are known.

The earliest known illustrated manuscript in the Persian language is an early 13th century copy of the epic Varka and Golshah, which was most probably created in Konya in Central Anatolia, under the Seljuk Sultanate of Rum. It is the only Persian-language illustrated manuscript securely datable to before Mongol conquest, and it can be dated to circa 1250.

=== Mongol era (1260–1335) ===
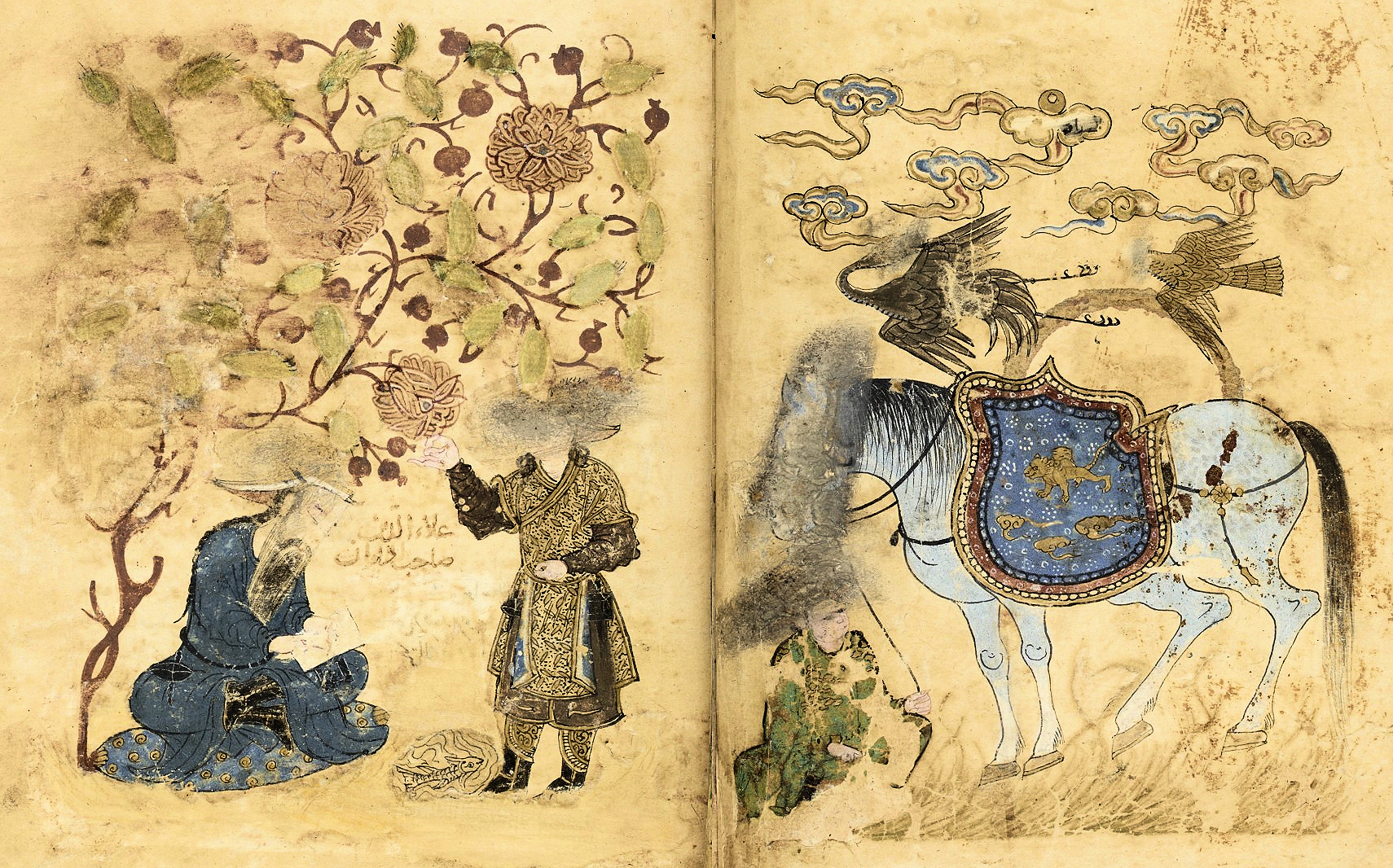
Juvaynī sitting and writing in front of Mongol emir Arghun Aqa. Frontispiece of Tārīkh-i Jahān-Gushā "The History of The World Conqueror" (damaged), completed in A.H. 689/ 1290 CE. Bibliothèque Nationale de France (Suppl. Pers. 205). It shows the "origin of the Metropolitan style" at the Ilkhanid court.

The traumatic Mongol invasion of 1219 onwards established the Ilkhanate as a branch of the Mongol Empire, and despite the huge destruction of life and property, the new court had a galvanising effect on book painting, importing many Chinese works and probably artists, with their long-established tradition of narrative painting, and sponsoring a cultural revival and the creation of history-related literary works. Baghdad was conquered in 1258, and Mosul in 1262.

The earliest known Persian-language manuscript of Kalīla wa-Dimna (Topkapl Palace Museum Library, H.363) appears around this time: it is dated to 1265-80, and was likely produced in Baghdad, or possibly Mosul. Another known illustrated Persian manuscript under the Mongols is the Tarikh-i Jahangushay (1290), commissioned by the Mongol emir Arghun Aqa, also one of the earliest examples of "Metropolitan style" of the Mongol Ilkhanid court, followed by the 1297-1299 manuscript Manafi' al-hayawan (Ms M. 500), commissioned by Mongol ruler Ghazan. The Ilkhanids continued to migrate between summer and winter quarters, which together with other travels for war, hunting and administration, made the portable form of the illustrated book the most suitable vehicle for painting, as it also was for mobile European medieval rulers. The Great Mongol Shahnameh, now dispersed, is the outstanding manuscript of the following period.

It was only in the 14th century that the practice began of commissioning illustrated copies of classic works of Persian poetry, above all the Shahnameh of Ferdowsi (940–1020) and the Khamsa of Nizami, which were to contain many of the finest miniatures. Previously book illustration, of works in both Arabic and Persian, had been concentrated in practical and scientific treatises, often following at several removes the Byzantine miniatures copied when ancient Greek books were translated. However a 14th-century flowering of Arabic illustrated literary manuscripts in Syria and Egypt collapsed at the end of the century, leaving Persia the undisputed leader in Islamic book illustration. Many of the best miniatures from early manuscripts were removed from their books in later centuries and transferred to albums, several of which are now in Istanbul; this complicates tracing the art history of the period.

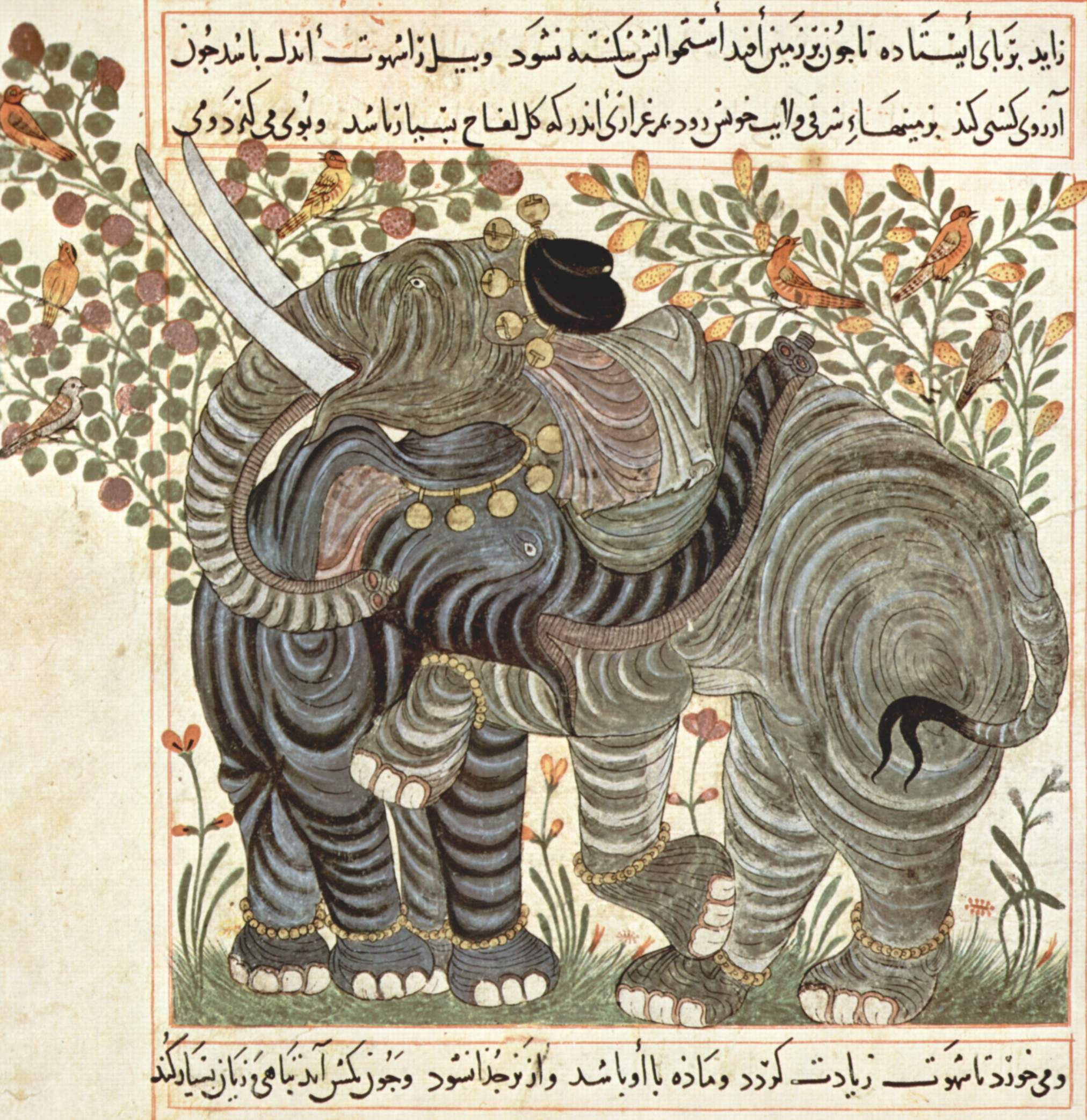
Ibn Bakhtishu's Manafi al-Hayawan ("Uses of Animals"), commissioned by Ghazan. Maragha, Persia, 1297–1299. Morgan Library & Museum (Ms. M.500).

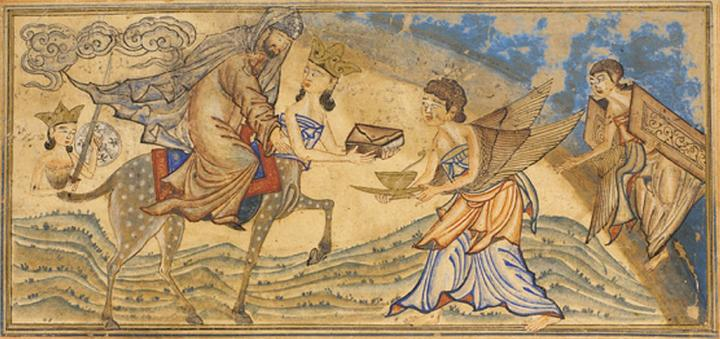
The Mi'raj (also called the "Night Ride") of Muhammed on Buraq, Tabriz, 1307; Ilkhanid, with both Christian and Chinese influences, and horizontal format.

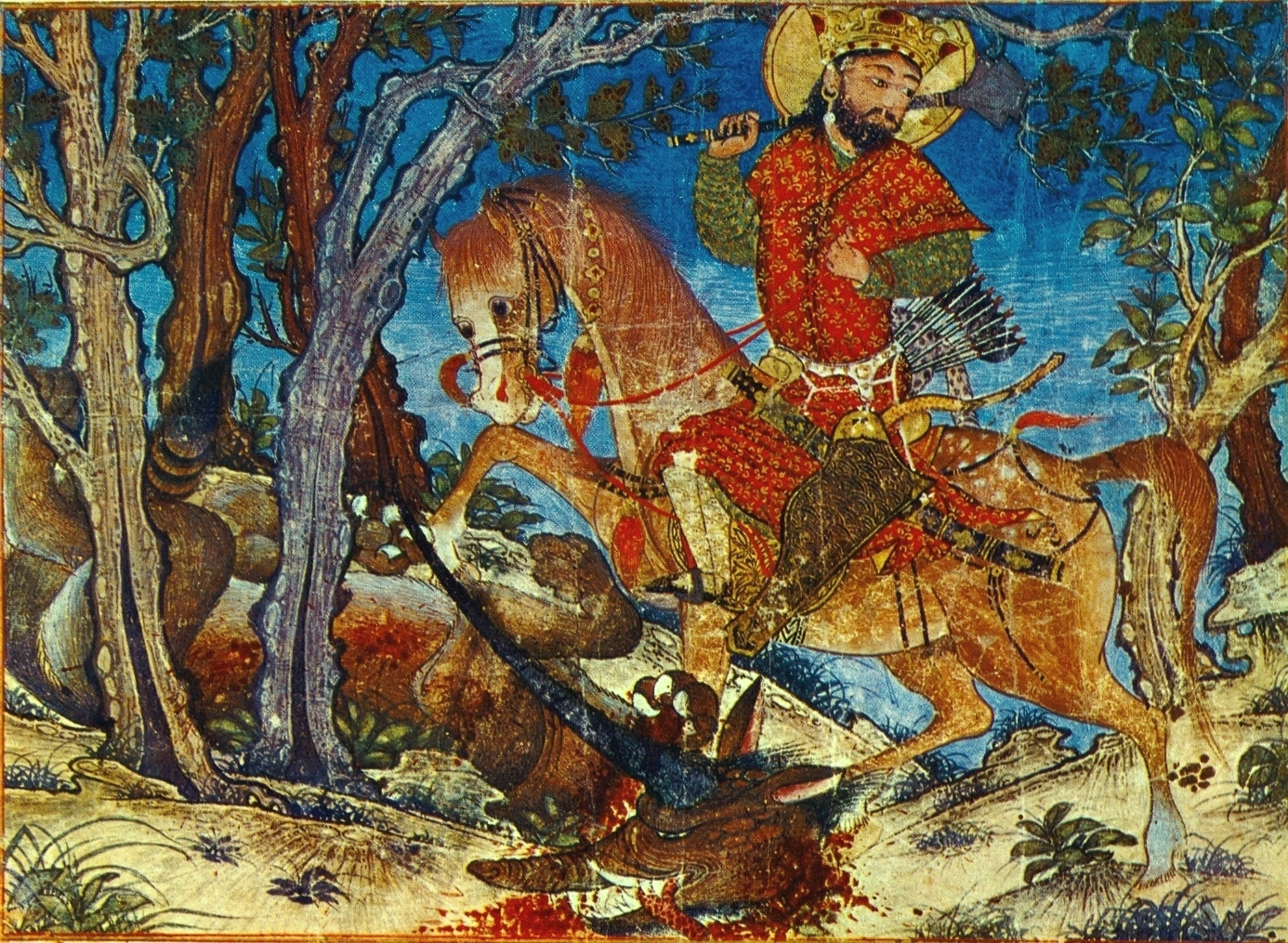
Scene from the Great Mongol Shahnameh, a key Ilkhanid work, 1330s?

=== Post-Mongol era (1335–1385) ===
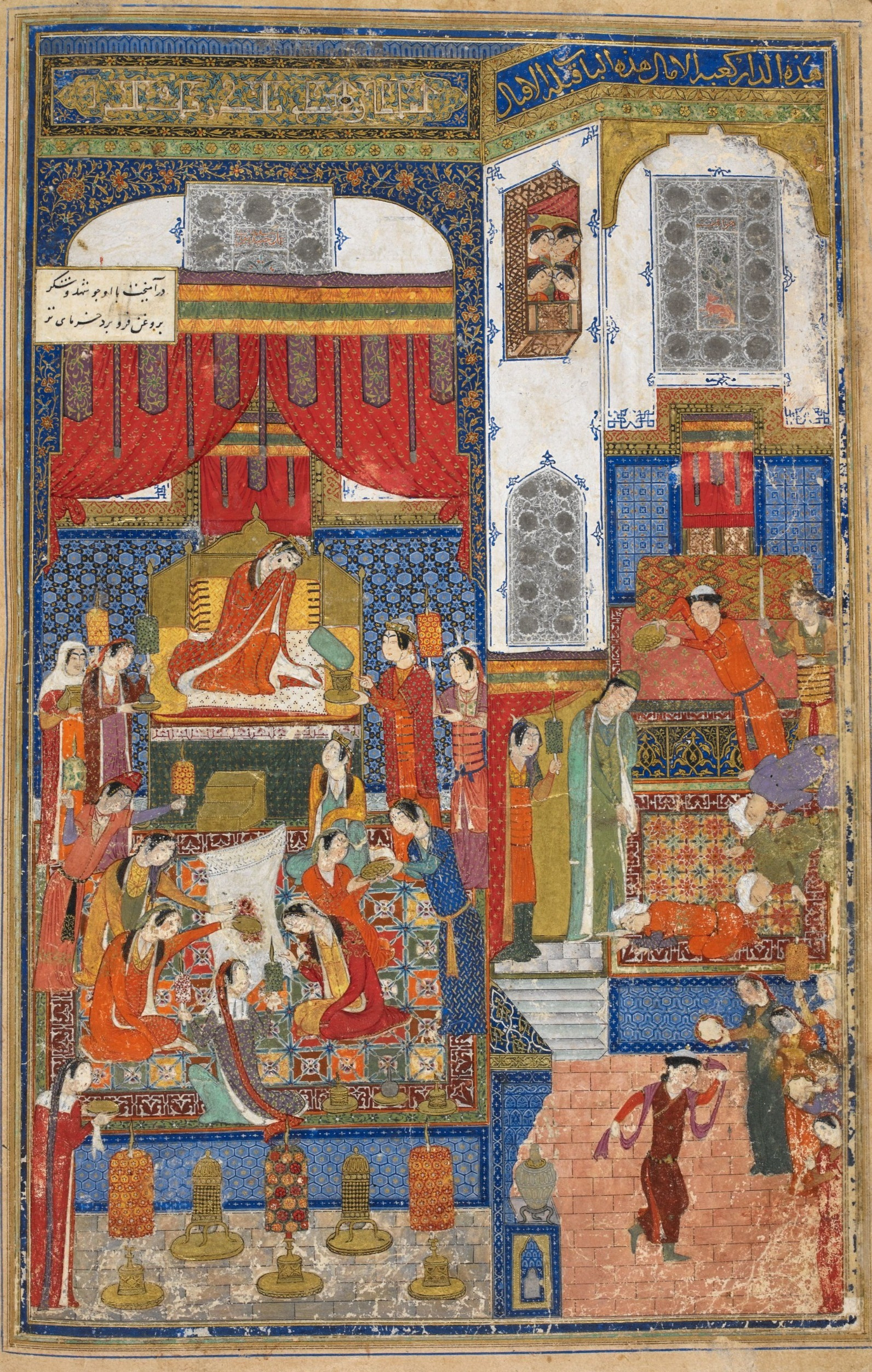
Divan of Khvaju Kirmani, illustrations by Junayd, dated 1396, Baghdad. This is "the most firmly dated illustrated and high-quality Jalayirid manuscript".

Once the Ilkhanate fragmented in 1335, various dynasties fought for supremacy in Persian lands: descendants of the Mongols such as the Jalayirids and the Chobanids, or local dynasties such as the Injuids and the Muzaffarids. They all prolonged the art of the miniatures developed by the Mongols, sometimes with local refinements and variations.

The Jalayirids expanded the limits of refinement and delicacy. The Jalayirids led some of the most important changes in Persian art, at the junction between the creations of the Il-Khanate in the 13-14th century, and those of the Safavids in the 16th century. They contributed to the formation of Persian miniatures, especially through the introduction of Chinese-inspired natural landscapes. According to Ernst J. Grube, Jalayirid painting was the source of "modern" Persian-Islamic painting. The characteristics of the Jalayirid school of miniatures were lyrical scenes with elegant small figures in lavish interiors or lush natural surroundings, painted in pastel colors. The subject matters were generally poetic, rather than epic. It is known that some illustrated manuscripts of the Jalayirids were copied and emulated by the Timurids. A written remark by Dust Muhammad mentions that the Timurid ruler Baysunghur ordered a book to be made with the exact same specifications (dimensions, arrangement of text, illustrations) as a Jalayirid original. In the 16th century, Dust Muhammad described the Timurid Baysunghur's efforts at emulating Jalayirid art, after his occupation of Tabriz in 1421 and capture of artists from Tabriz:

His Highness Baysunghur Mirza had Master Sidi Ahmad the painter, Khwaja Ali the portraitist and Master Qiwamuddin the bookbinder brought from Tabriz and ordered that after the pleasing manner of Sultan Ahmad of Baghdad's miscellany, they should produce a book in exactly the same format and layout and with the same scenes depicted. The copying of it was given into the charge of Mawlana Fariduddin Ja 'far. The binding was commissioned of the aforementioned Master Qiwamuddin, by whom inlay in bindings was invented; and Mir Khalil was put in charge of decoration and depiction of scenes.

— Preface to the Bahram Mirza Album (extract), by Dust Muhammad.

The Injuids attempted to develop an original style as a symbol of their recovered political independence.

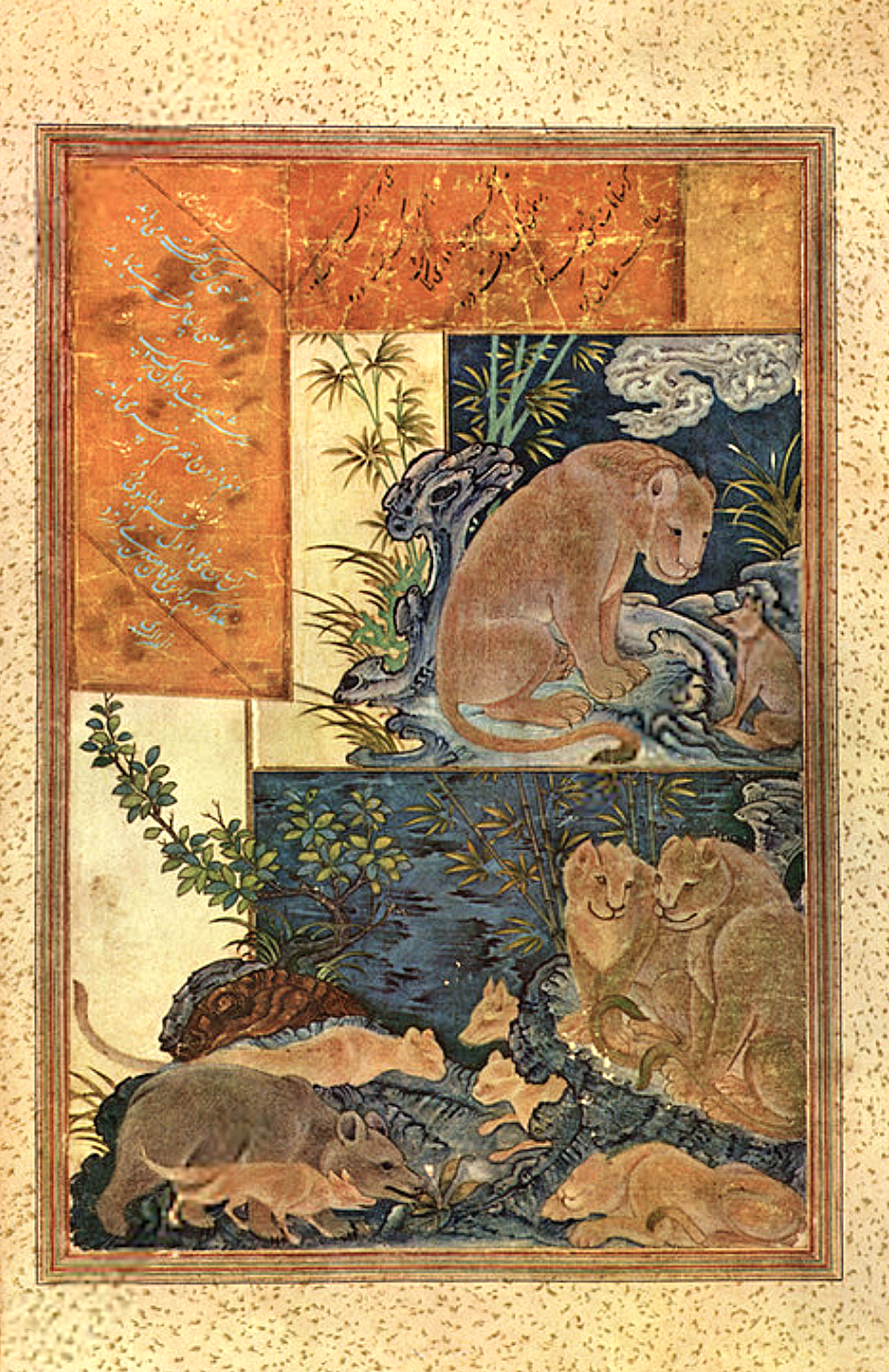
Jalayirid Kalila and Dimna (1370–74)

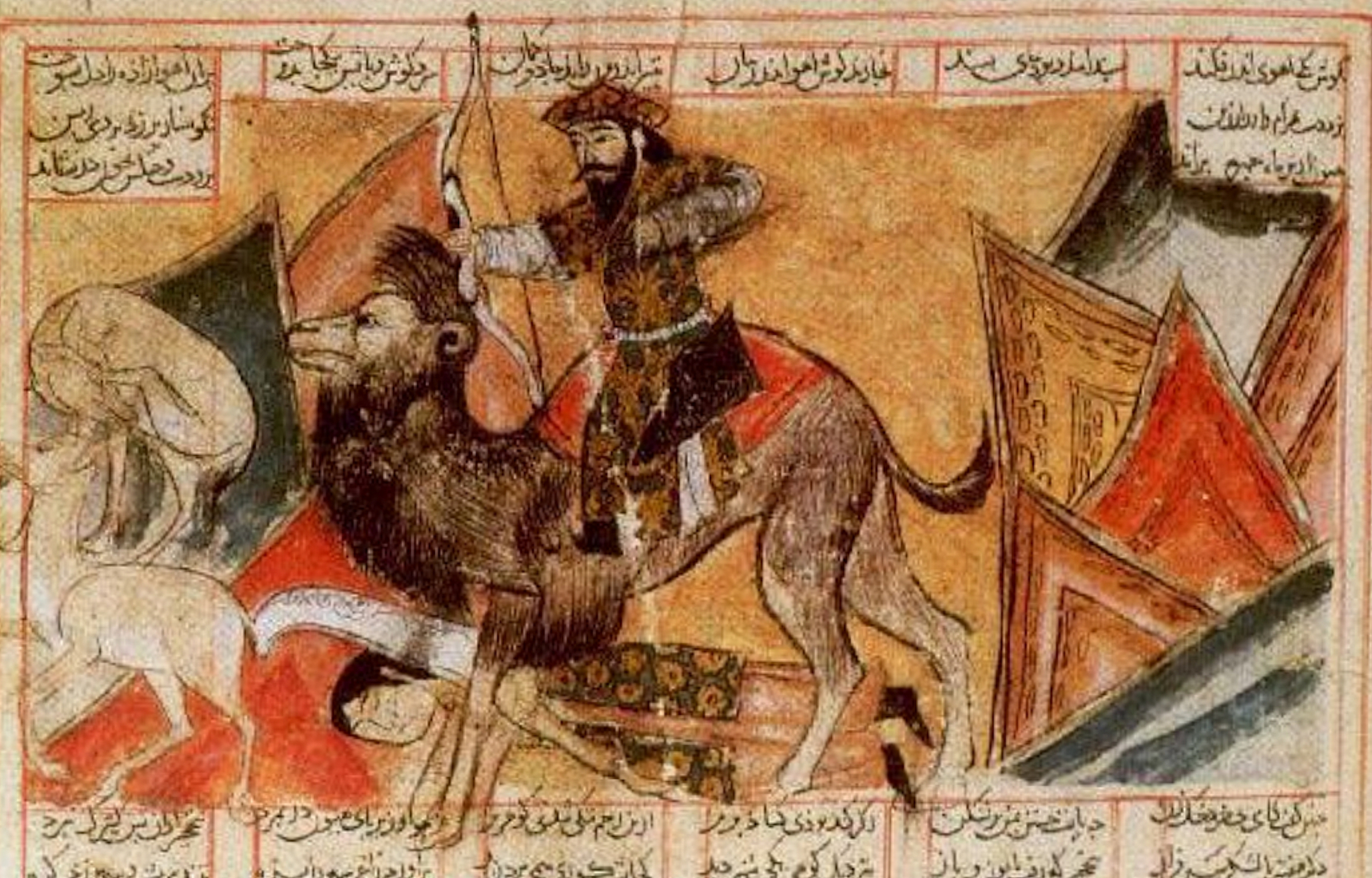
Injuid miniature: Bahram Gur and Azadeh in hunting place, Istanbul Shahnameh, Shiraz 1331.

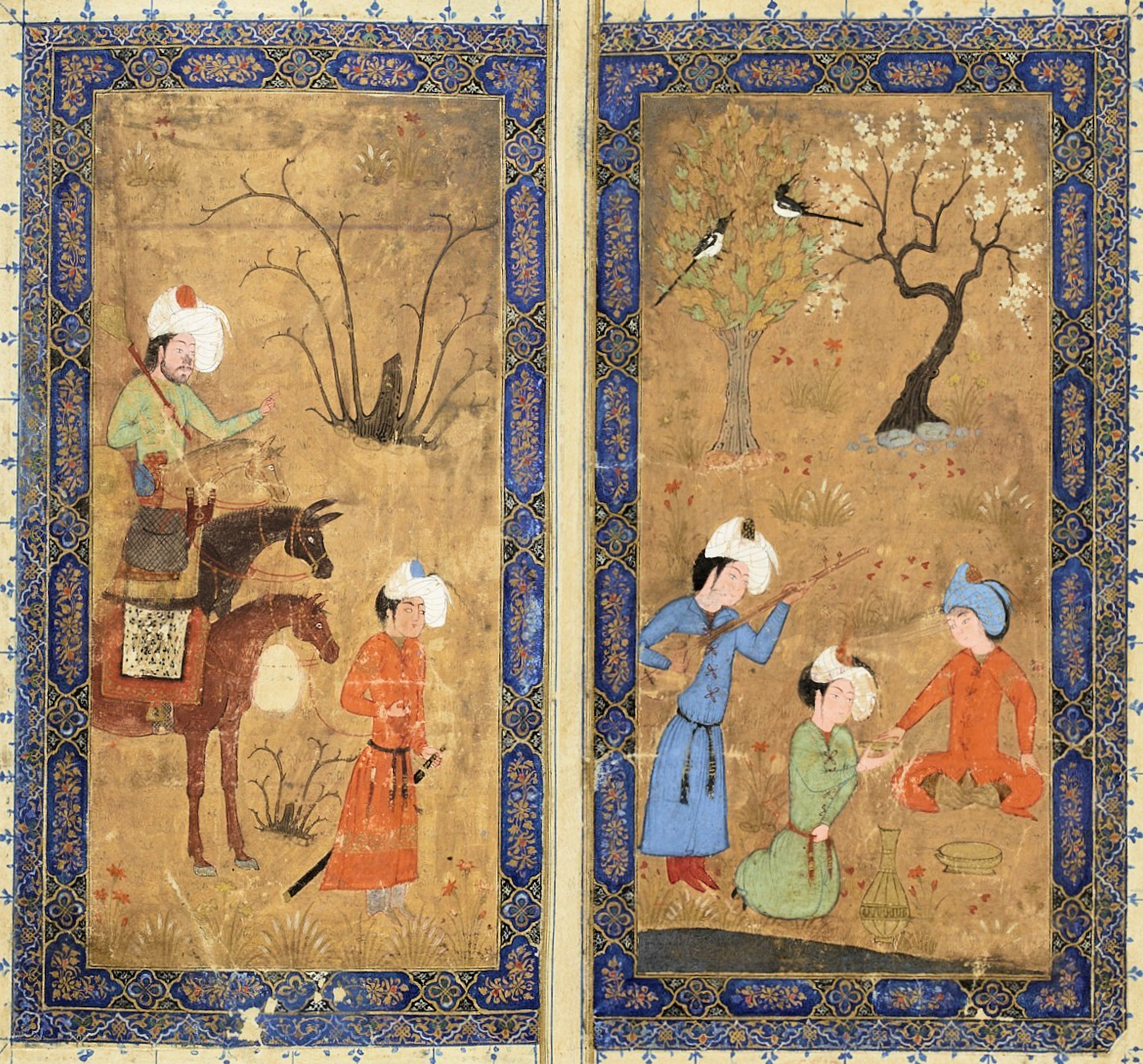
Frontispiece with Prince and attendants, probably circa 1390, final Muzaffarid period, Shiraz.

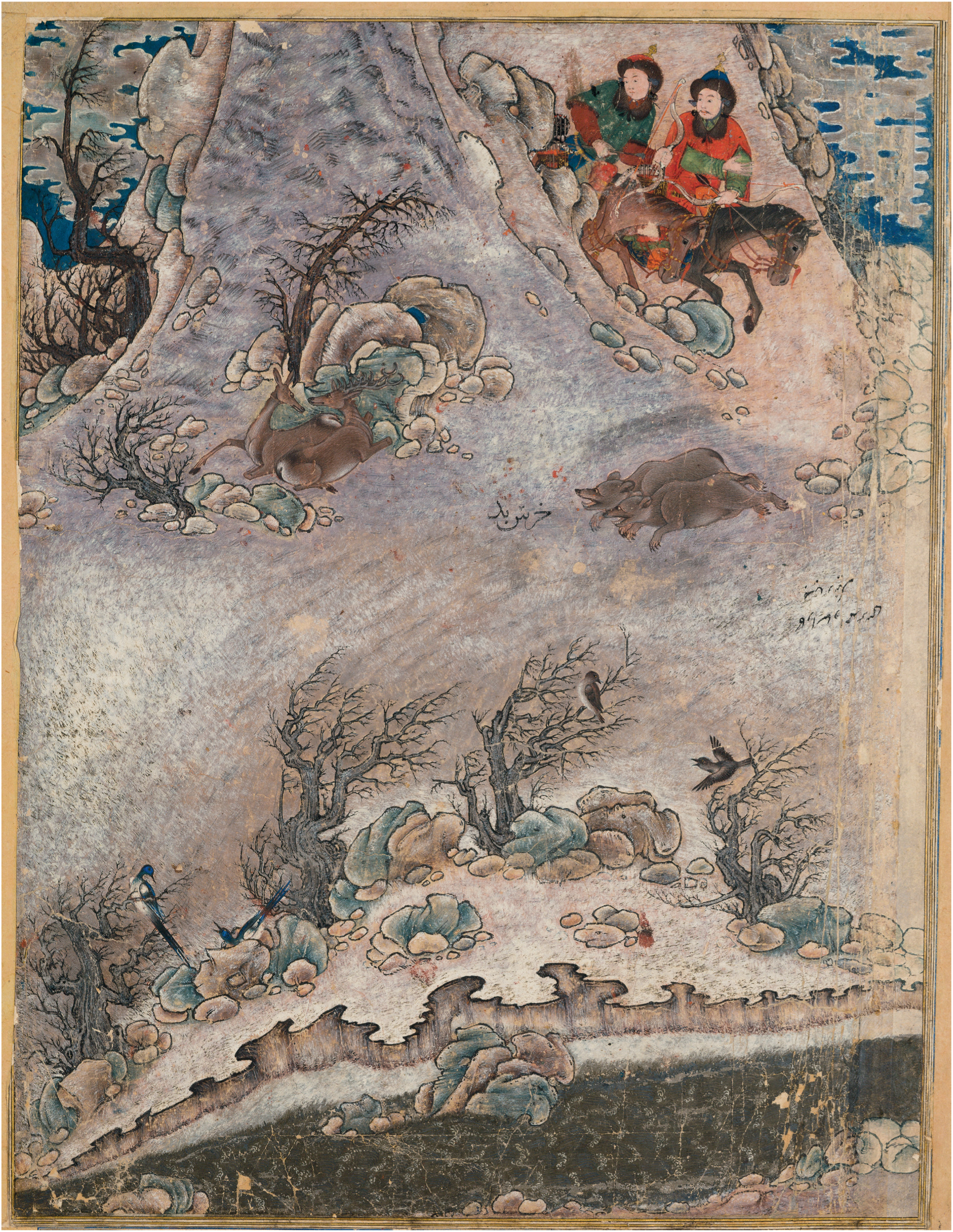
Riders in a Wintry Landscape with Bears, attr: Ahmad Musa, mid 14th- century. Jalayirid Tabriz or Baghdad

=== The Timurids and Turkmen (1381–1501) ===
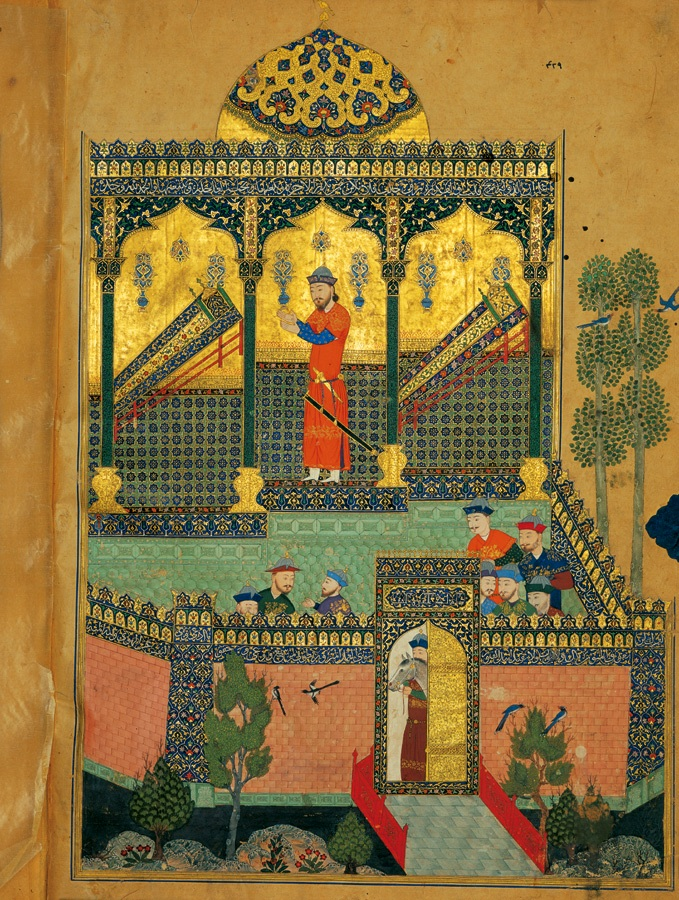
Baysonghor Shahnameh, 1430. He was a key patron of the Herat school

After 1335 the Ilkhanate split into several warring dynasties, all swept aside by the new invasion of Timur from 1381. He established the Timurid dynasty, bringing a fresh wave of Chinese influence, who were replaced by the Qara Qoyunlu in 1452, followed by the Aq Qoyunlu from 1468, who were in turn replaced by the Safavid dynasty by 1501; they ruled until 1722. After a chaotic period Nader Shah took control, but there was no long-lived dynasty until the Qajar dynasty, who ruled from 1794 to 1925.

Tabriz in the north-west of Iran is the longest established centre of production, and Baghdad (then under Persian rule) was often important. Shiraz in the south, sometimes the capital of a sub-ruler, was a centre from the late 14th century, and Herat, now in Afghanistan, was important in the periods when it was controlled from Persia, especially when the Timurid prince Baysonqor was governor in the 1420s; he was then the leading patron in Persia, commissioning the Baysonghor Shahnameh and other works. Each centre developed its own style, which were largely reconciled and combined under the Safavids.

The schools of Herat, where the Timurid royal workshops usually were, had developed a style of classical restraint and elegance, and the painters of Tabriz, a more expressive and imaginative style. Tabriz was the former capital of the Turkmen rulers, and in the early Safavid era the styles were gradually harmonized in works like the Shahnameh of Shah Tahmasp. But a famous unfinished miniature showing Rostam asleep, while his horse Rakhsh fights off a lion, was probably made for this manuscript, but was never finished and bound in, perhaps because its vigorous Tabriz style did not please Tahmasp. It appears to be by Sultan Mohammad, whose later works in the manuscript show a style adapted to the court style of Bizhad. It is now in the British Museum.

=== Safavid synthesis (1501–1736) ===
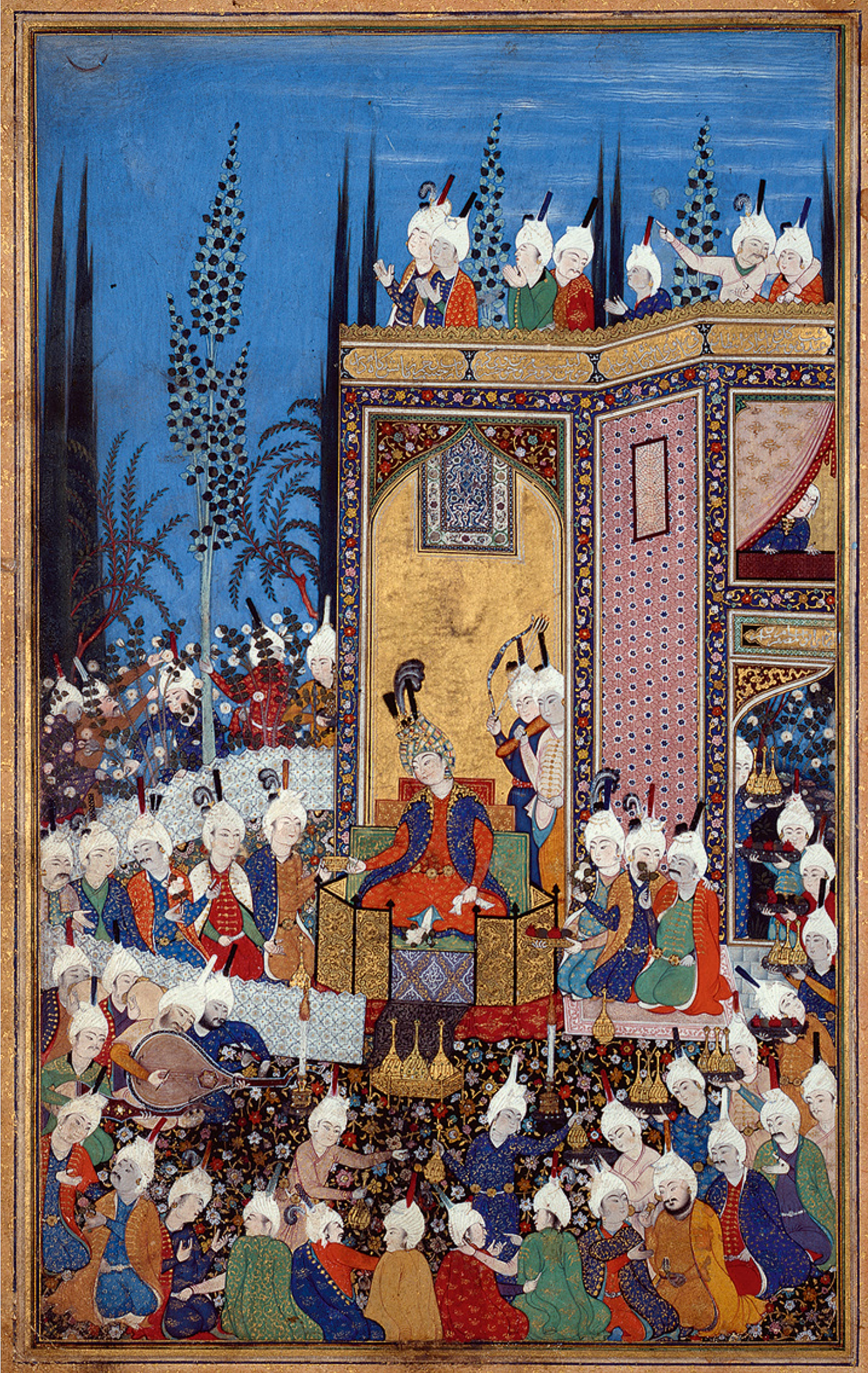
Shah Tahmasp at the Celebration of `Id. Painted by Sultan Mohammed in Tabriz, circa 1531. Cartier Hafiz.

The Safavid art of the miniature was in many ways a synthesis and an evolution upon the achievements of the previous schools. Dust Muhammad in the 16th century attributed the current state of the art to the foundational work of Ahmad Musa during the Il-Khanate period, while acknowledging the advances made in China and Europe:

The custom of portraiture flourished in the lands of Cathay and the Franks until sharp-penned Mercury scrivened the rescript of rule in the name of Sultan Abusaʿid Khudaybanda. Master Ahmad Musa, who was his father’s pupil, lifted the veil from the face of depiction, and the [style of] depiction that is now current was invented by him.

— Dust Muhammad, introduction to the Bahram Mirza Album (1544).

Shah Ismail, by conquering both the Aq Qoyunlu and the Timurids, took over the two dominant Persian artistic schools of the time in the domain of calligraphy and miniatures: the western Turkoman school based in Tabriz, characterized by vibrant and colorful compositions, which had developed under his uncle Sultan Yaqub Aq Qoyunlu, and the eastern Timurid school based in Herat and brought to new summits by Sultan Husayn Bayqara, which was more balanced and restrained and used subtle colors. Artists from both realms were made to work together, such as Behzad from Herat and Sultan Mohammed from Tabriz, to collaborate on major manuscripts such as the Shahnameh of Shah Tahmasp. This synthesis created the new Safavid imperial style. This new aesthetic also affected traditional crafts, including textiles, carpets, and metalwork, and influenced the styles of Ottoman Turkey and Mughal India.

Miniatures from the Safavid and later periods are far more common than earlier ones, but although some prefer the simpler elegance of the early 15th and 16th centuries, most art historians agree in seeing a rise in quality up to the mid-16th century, culminating in a series of superb royal commissions by the Safavid court, such as the Shahnameh of Shah Tahmasp (or Houghton Shahnameh). There was a crisis in the 1540s when Shah Tahmasp I, previously a patron on a large scale, ceased to commission works, apparently losing interest in painting. Some of his artists went to the court of his nephew Ibrahim Mirza, governor of Mashad from 1556, where there was a brief flowering of painting until the Shah fell out with his nephew in 1565, including a Haft Awrang, the "Freer Jami". Other artists went to the Mughal court.

After this period, and from the 17th century onward, the number of illustrated book manuscript commissions falls off, and the tradition falls into over-sophistication and decline.

== Chinese and European influences ==
=== Il-Khanid period (1260-1330) ===
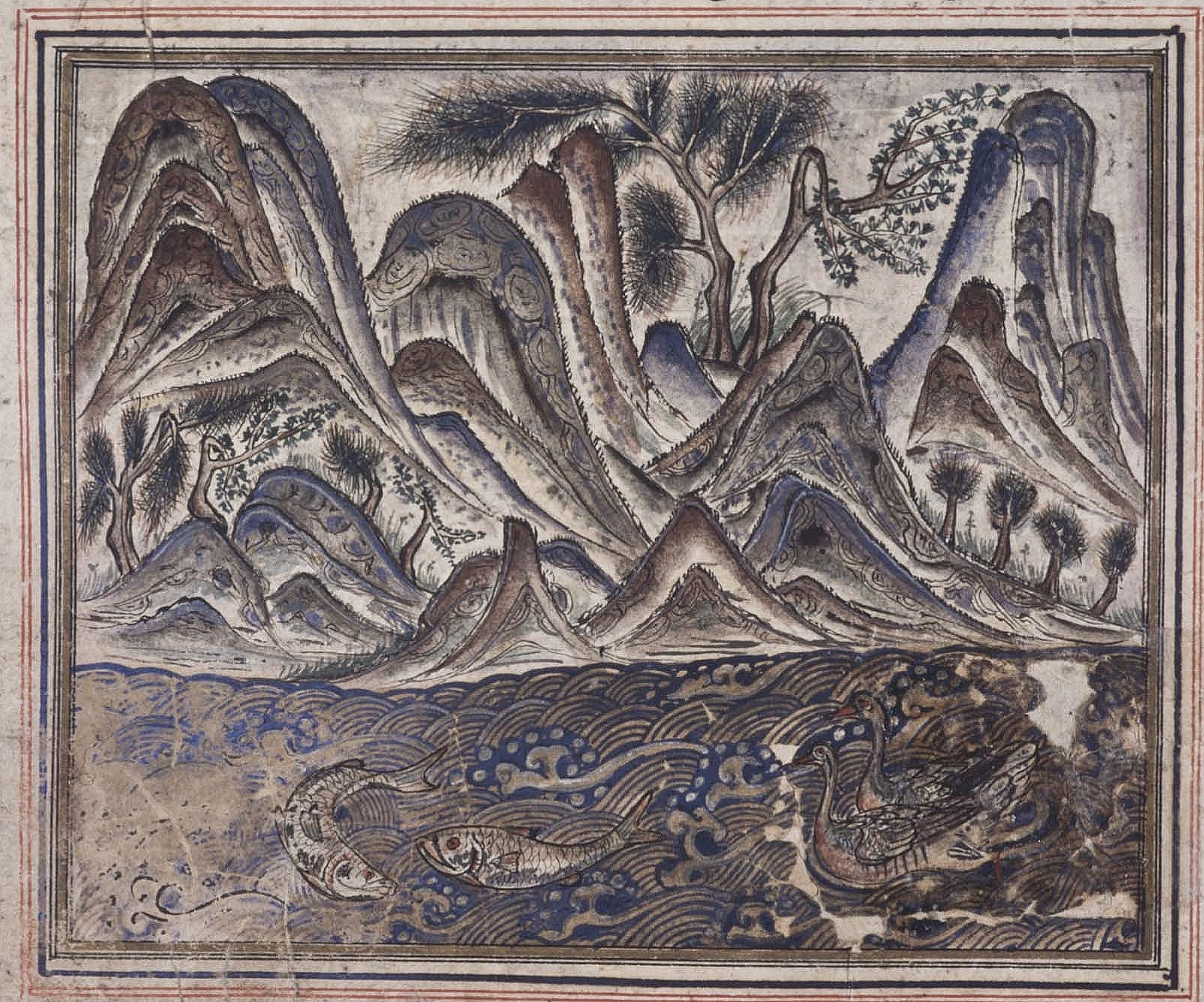
Chinese-style mountains in the Jami al-Tawarikh (1314-15, Tabriz).

Chinese influence on Persian miniature painting is substantial and perceptible. The tradition, retrospectively named, emerges under the Mongol (Ilkhanid) court in the late 13th and early 14th centuries, within an imperial context that linked Iran to East Asia through the interconnected Mongol khanates. From its earliest surviving manifestations, Persian miniature painting develops in dialogue with Chinese pictorial devices, evident in the early adoption of elements such as cloud bands, which often permeate the whole composition, stylised rocks and trees with especially-articulated, knotted trunks, ornamental animal motifs including dragons, uses of multiple horizons, and related compositional strategies, which would be further elaborated and intensified in later periods.

These Chinese pictorial devices reached Persian painters primarily through portable media, including textiles; ceramics and porcelain; and portable paintings such as scrolls, albums, and banners. They were also transmitted through decorated objects beyond fine art, including lacquerware, metalwork, carved jade and other hardstone objects, and illustrated maps and cosmological diagrams. Maybe there was influence through Central Asian and Mongol court wall-painting traditions as well. These channels shaped painters’ engagement with Chinese visual logic without necessitating sustained contact with direct Chinese-trained artists.

=== Jalayirid period (1330-1410) ===
Jalayirid art was characterized by increased naturalism. Parallels have been noted with the contemporary naturalistic Late Gothic trends, and cross-cultural exchanges, both with the Latin West and Chinese art have been suggested. In effect, Christian communities of European merchants (Genoese, Venetian, Pisan, French, Catalan) had been thriving in the Ilkhanid capitals of Tabriz and Soltaniyeh, and although they faltered in the troubles after the end of the Ilkhanate and the Black Death (1348-1350), were still encouraged by the Jalayirid Sultan Uvays I through correspondence offering road security and reduced taxes. The artist Dust Muhammad acknowledged China and Europe while describing the contributions of the great naturalistic artist Ahmad Musa, active at the end of the Ilkhanate and during the Jalayirid period:

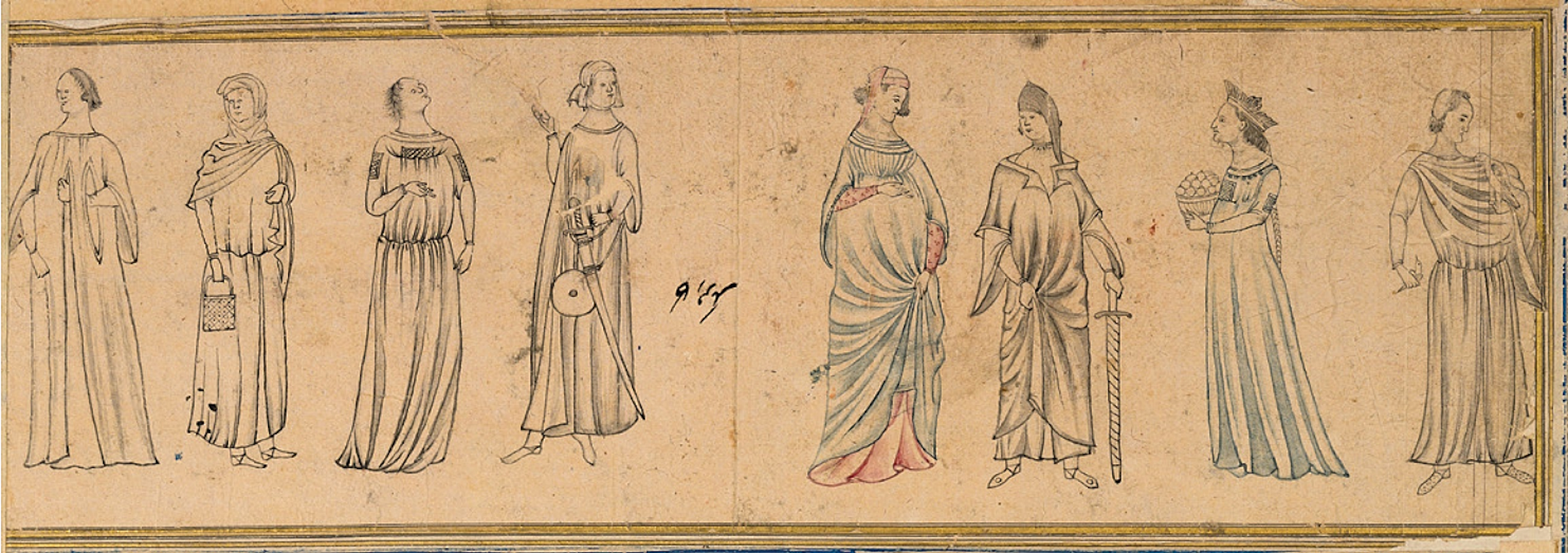
Eight Figures in European Attire, Jalayirid drawing in European style. Baghdad or Tabriz, c. 1370. Saray Album H.2153.

[T]he custom of portraiture flourished in the lands of Cathay and the Franks until sharp-penned Mercury scrivened the rescript of rule in the name of Sultan Abusaʿid Khudaybanda. Master Ahmad Musa, who was his father’s pupil, lifted the veil from the face of depiction, and the [style of] depiction that is now current was invented by him. Among the scenes by him that lighted on the page of the world in the reign of the aforementioned emperor, an Abusaʿidnama, a Kalila u Dimna, a Miʿrajnama calligraphed by Mawlana Abdullah Sayrafi, and a Tarikh-i Chingizi in beautiful script by an unknown hand were in the library of the late emperor Sultan-Husayn Mirza.

— Preface to the Bahram Mirza Album (extract), by Dust Muhammad..

Albums of the period, such as Saray Album H.2153 or Saray Album H.2160 often contain foreign work or works "in the manner of", complete with labelled inscriptions of as "Cathayan work" (kāri khaṭāy/khiṭāy) or "Frankish work" (kāri farang/firang). One such example is the a Europeanizing ink and wash drawing, named Eight Figures in European Attire, a work "in the Frankish manner" in the European "grisaille" style, located next to works attributed to Ahmad Musa (H. 2153, fols. 55r, 54v). Another Jalayirid work, named Celestial Vision, combines elements from the arts of Europe (a Christian scene of enlightenment, in the style of Taddeo Gaddi’s Annunciation to the Shepherds (1327–30) of Pietro Lorenzetti’s Stigmata of St. Francis (c. 1320), and China (a bent tree, a five-clawed two-horned imperial dragon, Chinese cloud bands).

=== Timurid, Turkic and Safavid periods (15th-16th centuries) ===
During the Timurid and especially the Safavid periods, this inherited vocabulary was more fully adopted, adapted, and systematised. Painters expanded earlier devices into increasingly complex pictorial structures, developing more layered landscapes articulated across multiple spatial planes, floating figures, shifting or floating perspectives, and a more continuous, unfolding sense of space. In this later phase, Chinese narrative and figural conventions further informed figural treatment, contributing to lasting transformations in the spatial logic, stylisation, and compositional organisation of Persian painting.

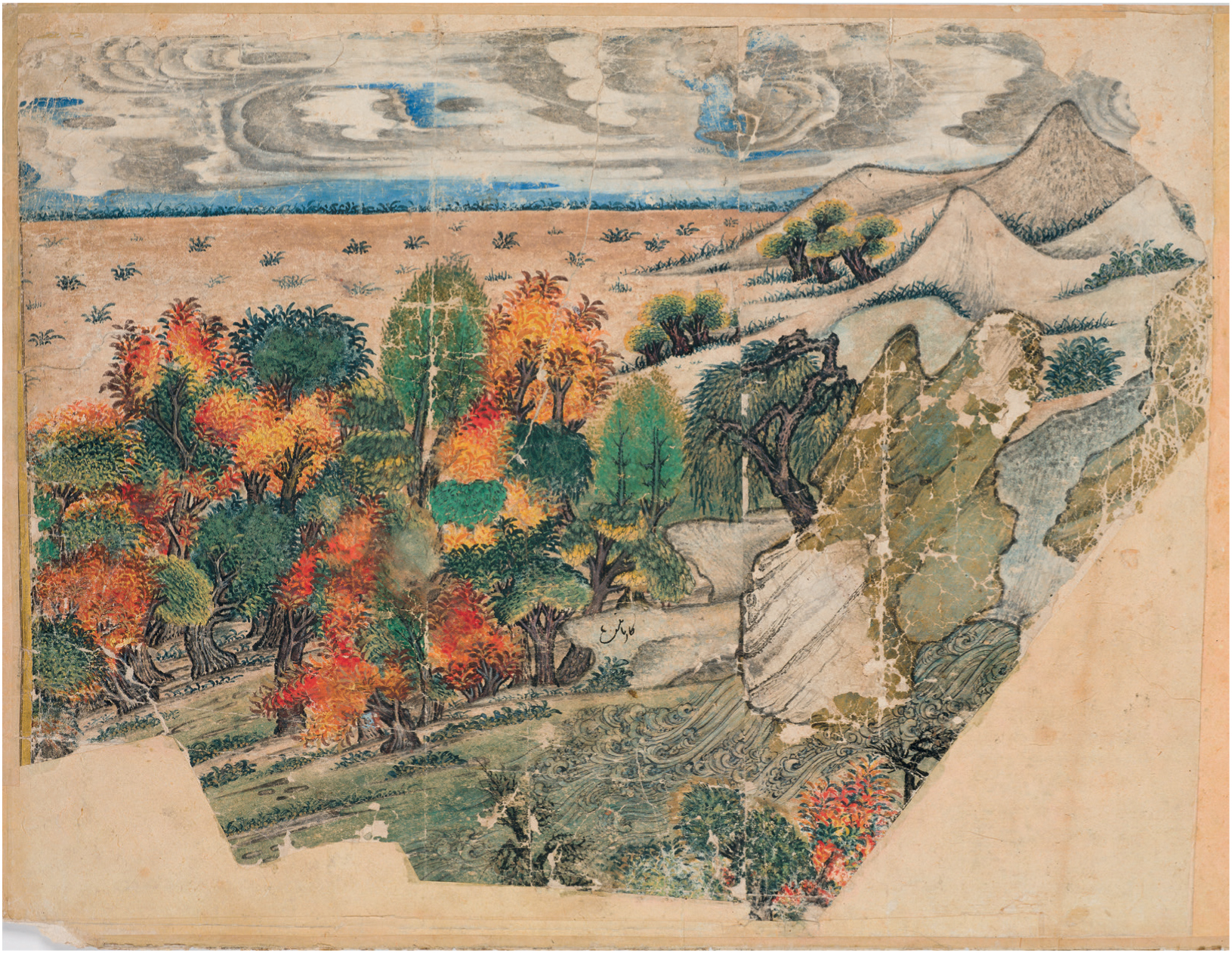
Autumn Landscape, a likely Jalayirid work in the Chinese manner. Tabriz or Baghdad, mid-14th century. TSMK, H. 2153.

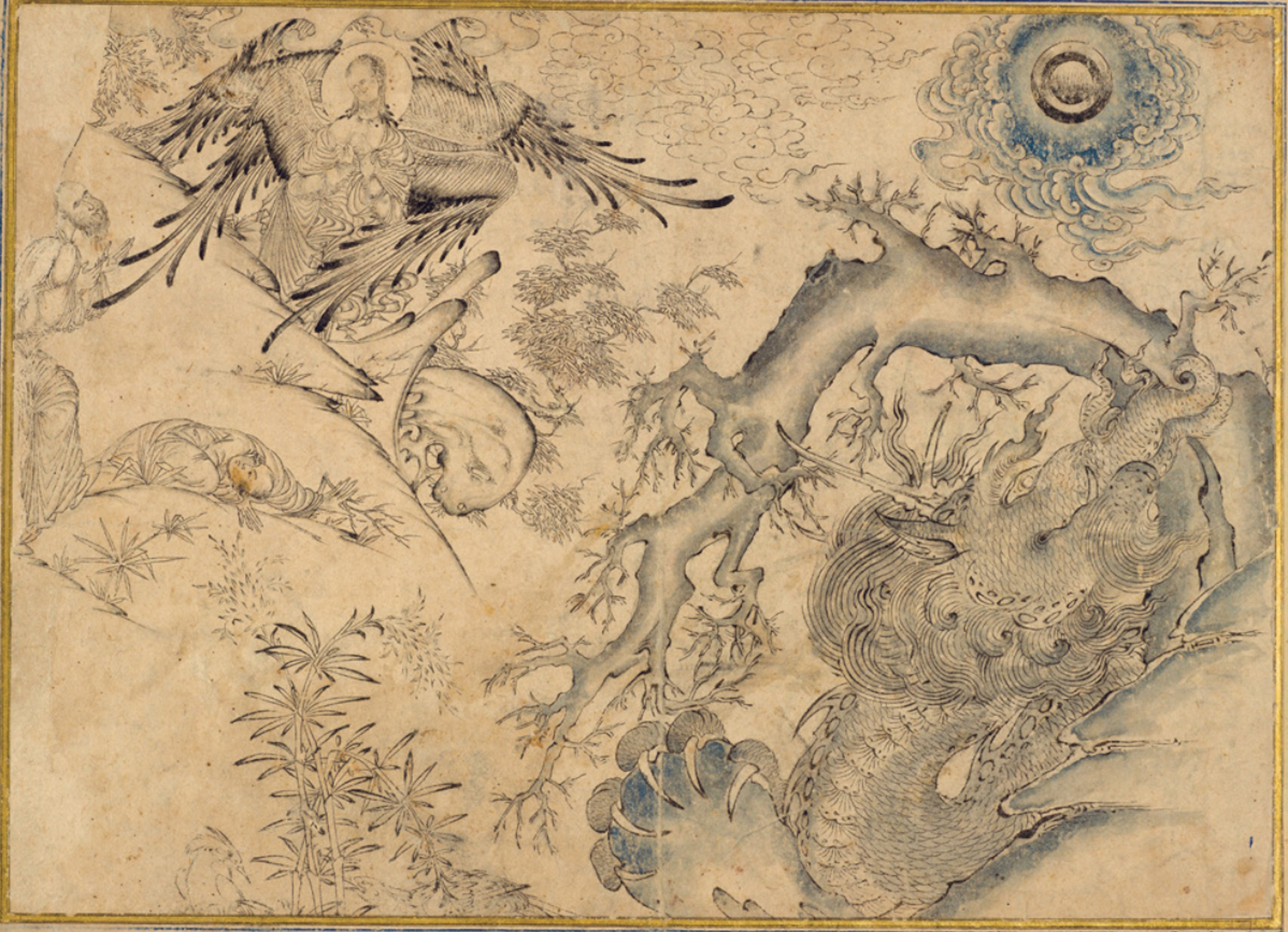
Celestial Vision, Jalayirid drawing combining European and Chinese style. Baghdad or Tabriz, c. 1375–1400. TSMK, H. 2153

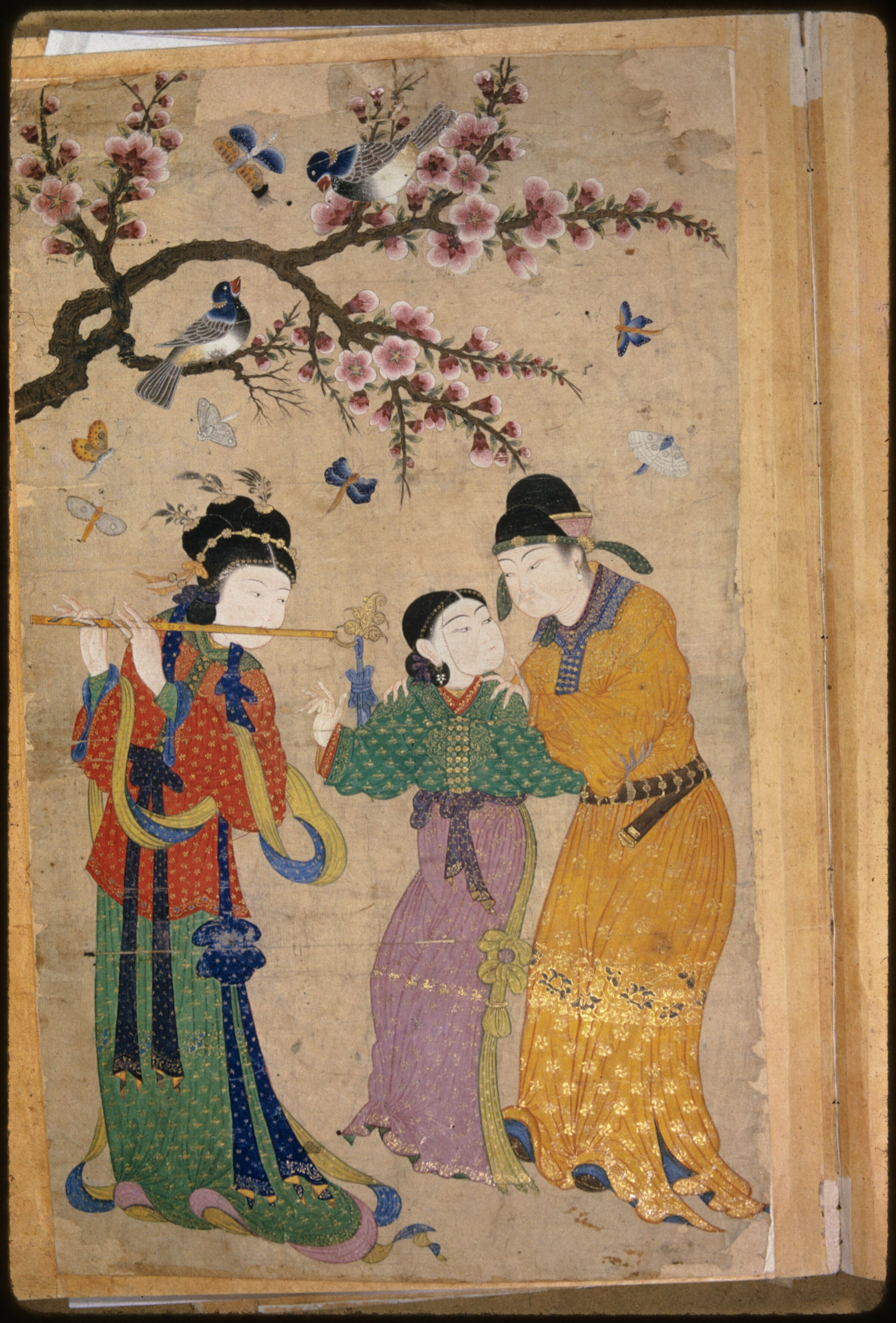
Nobles beneath a Blossoming Branch, Shaykhi, Aq Qoyunlu Tabriz, c. 1470–90.

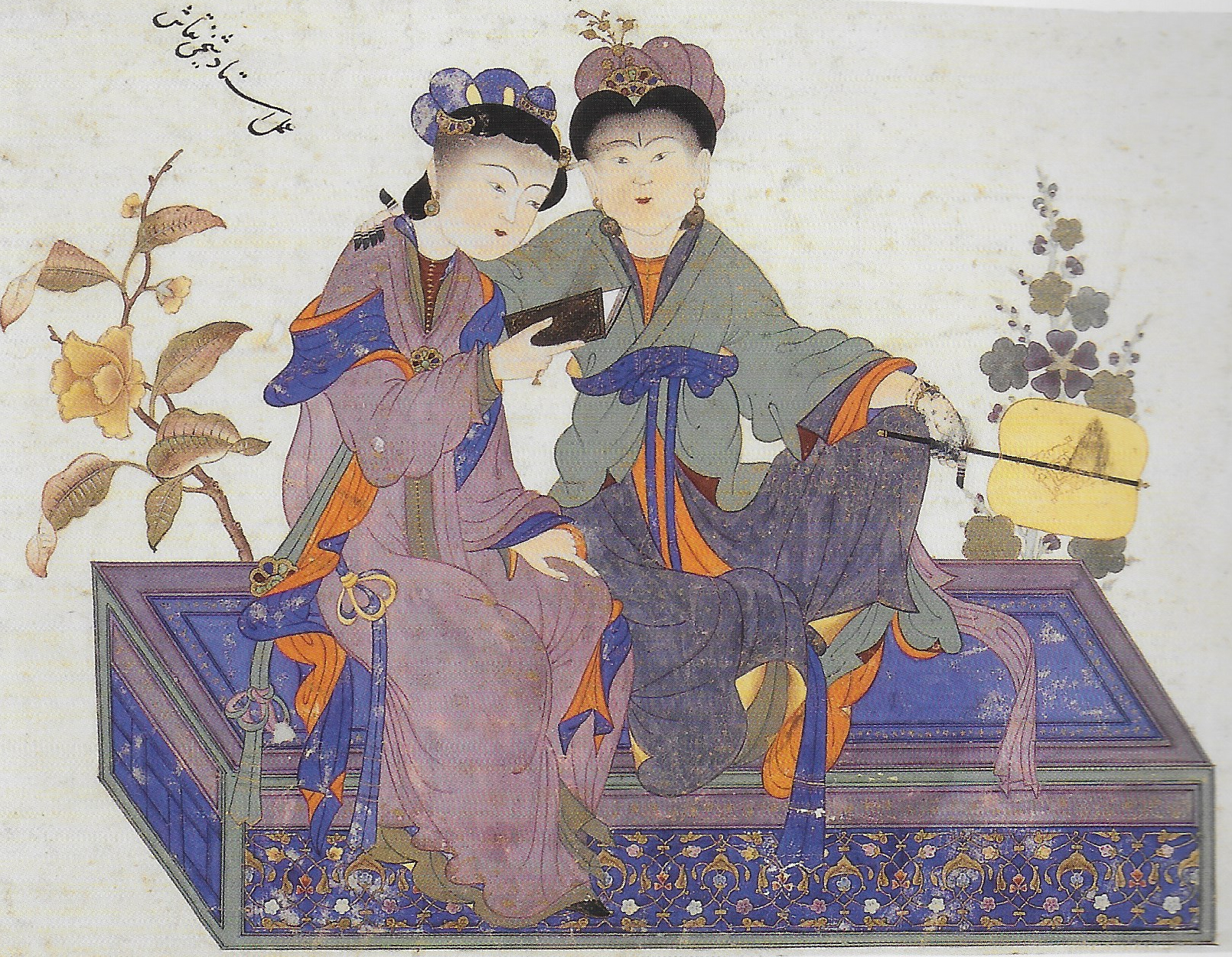
Chinese-style scene, signed by Shaykhi, ca. 1480. Tabriz. Topkapı Palace Library, H.2153.

== Prominent Persian miniaturists ==
The workshop tradition and division of labour within both an individual miniature and a book, as described above, complicates the attribution of paintings. Some are inscribed with the name of the artist, sometimes as part of the picture itself, for example as if painted on tiles in a building, but more often as a note added on the page or elsewhere; where and when being often uncertain. Because of the nature of the works, literary and historical references to artists, even if they are relied upon, usually do not enable specific paintings to be identified, though there are exceptions. The reputation of Kamāl ud-Dīn Behzād Herawī, or Behzād, the leading miniaturist of the late Timurid era, and founder of the Safavid school, remained supreme in the Persianate world, and at least some of his work, and style, can be identified with a degree of confidence, despite a good deal of continuing scholarly debate.

Sultan Mohammed, Mir Sayyid Ali, and Aqa Mirak, were leading painters of the next generation, the Safavid culmination of the classic style, whose attributed works are found together in several manuscripts. Abd al-Samad was one of the most successful Persian painters recruited by the Mughal Emperors to work in India. In the next generation, Reza Abbasi worked in the Late Safavid period producing mostly album miniatures, and his style was continued by many later painters. In the 19th century, the miniatures of Abu'l-Hasan Khan Gaffari (Sani ol molk), active in Qajar Persia, showed originality, naturalism, and technical perfection. Mahmoud Farshchian is a contemporary miniaturist whose style has broadened the scope of this art.

=== Gallery ===
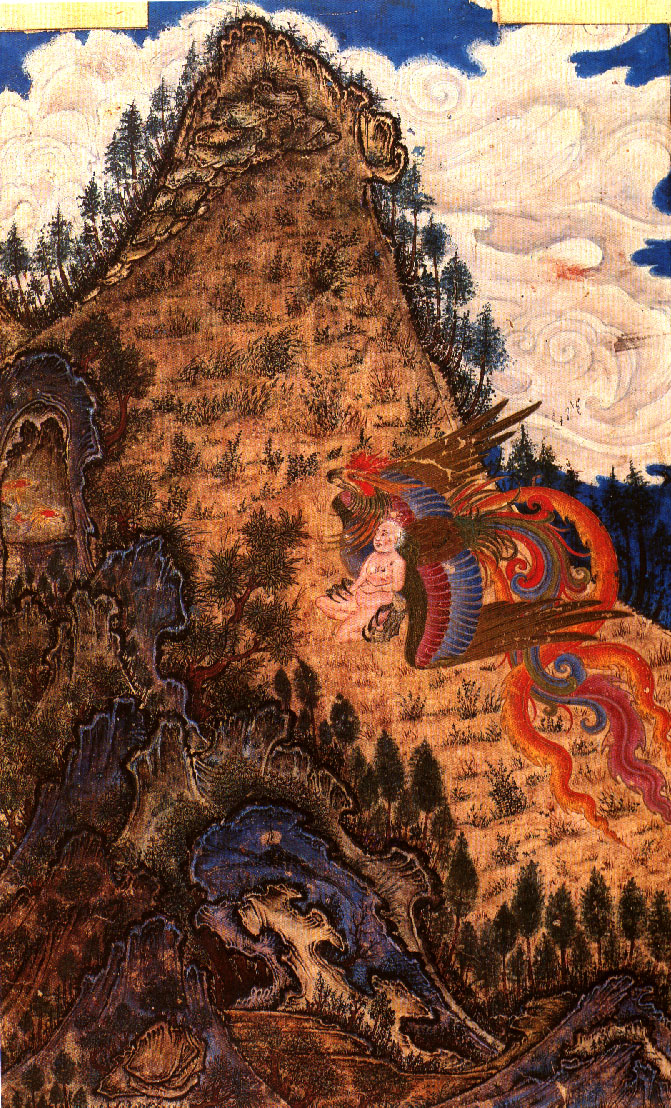
Tabriz, c.1370, Abduction of Zal by the Simurgh

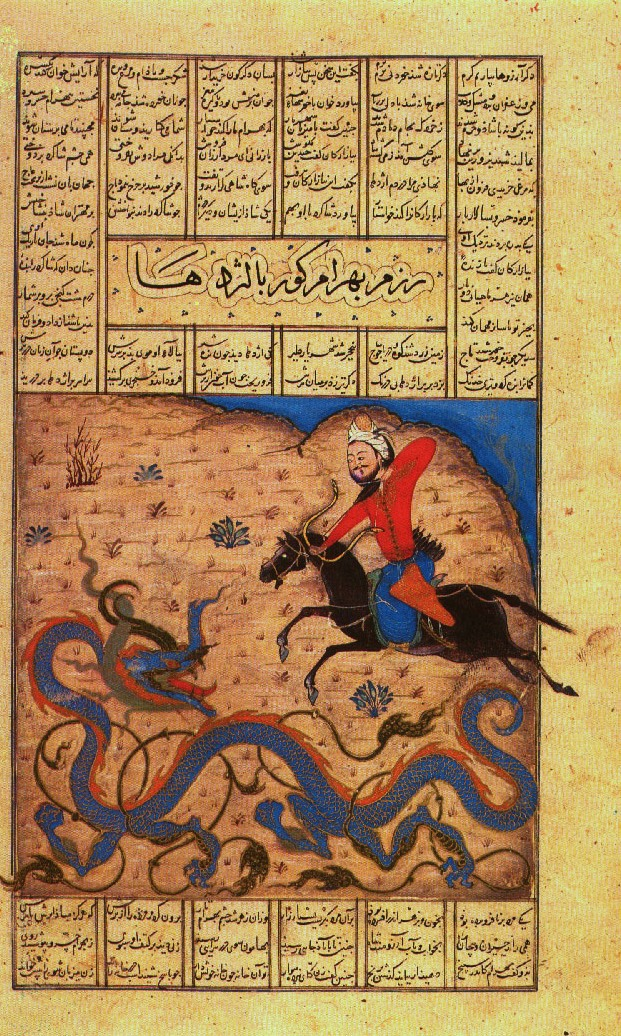
Bahram Gur Kills the Dragon, in a Shahnameh of 1371, Shiraz, with a very Chinese dragon

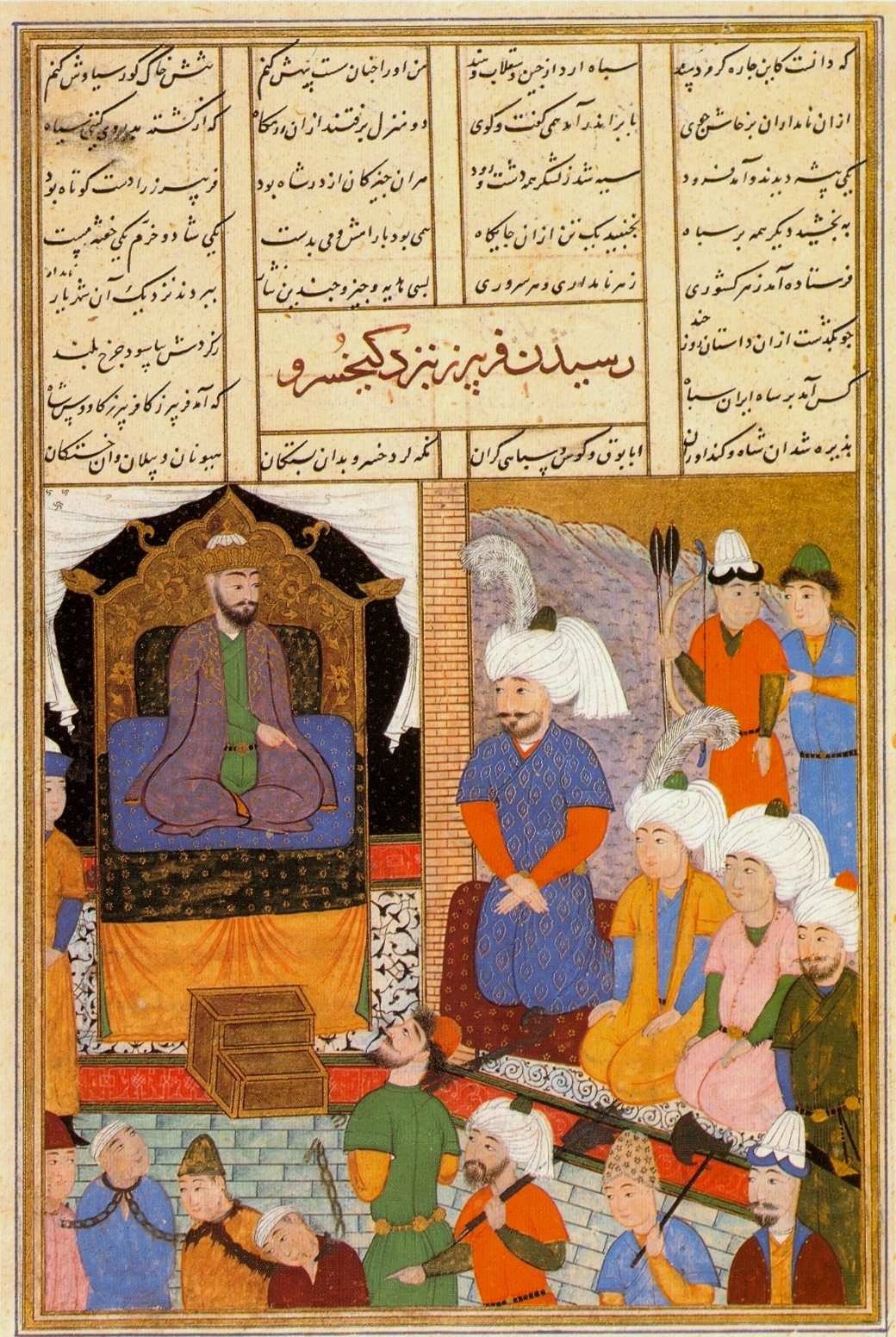
Page from the Turkmen "Big-head Shahnameh", Gilan, 1494

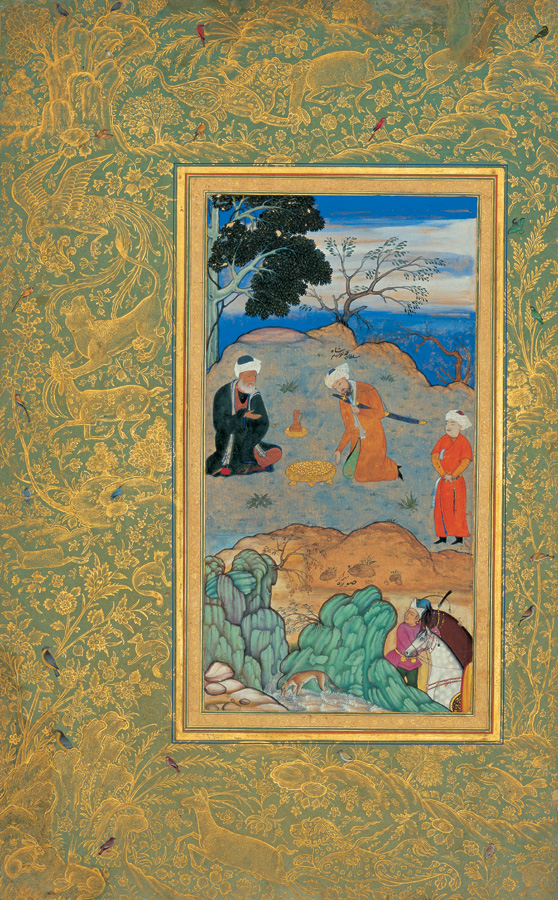
Behzad's Advice of the Ascetic, c. 1500–1550

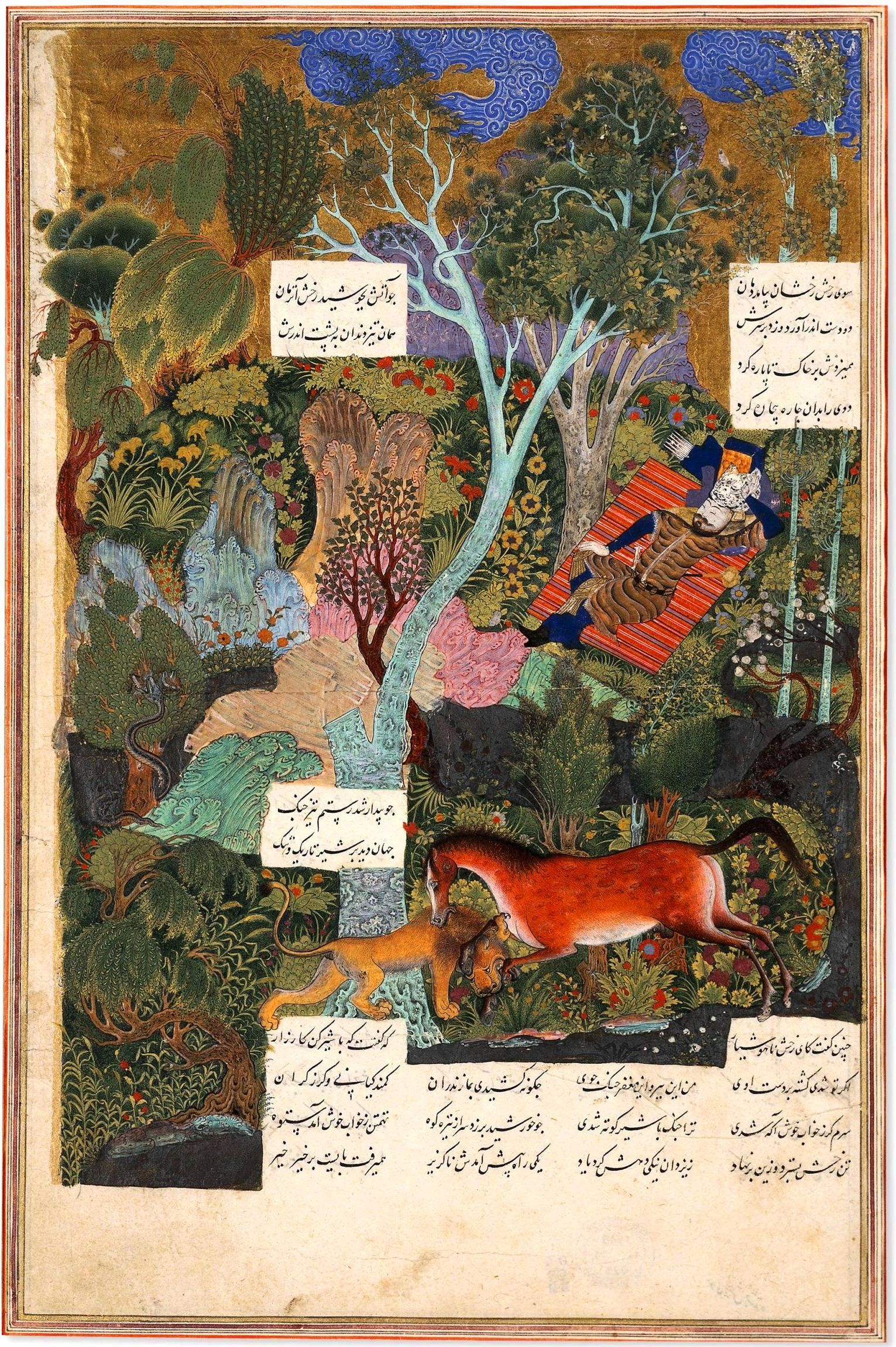
Rostam sleeps, while his horse Rakhsh fends off a lion. Probably an early work by Sultan Mohammed, 1515–20

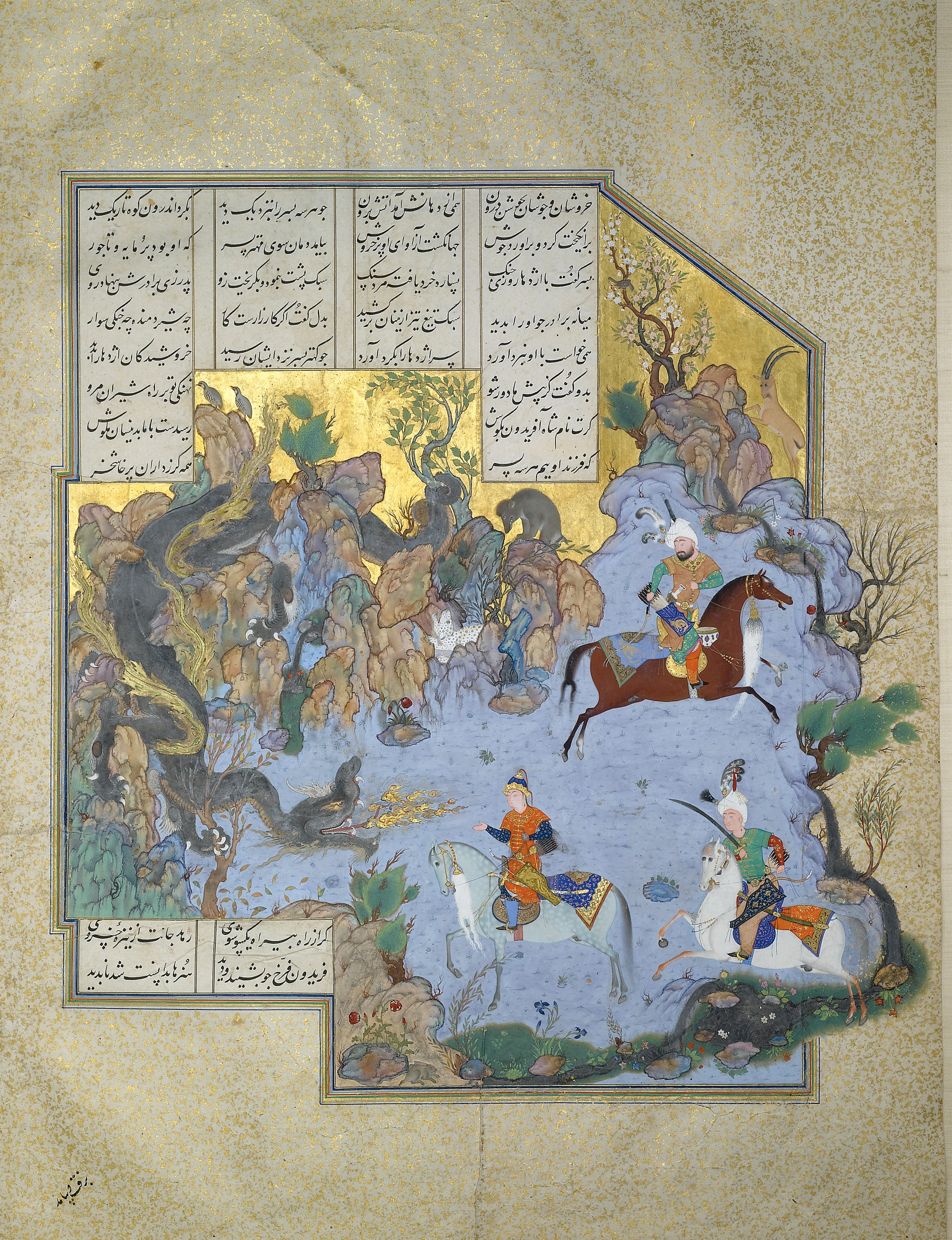
Fereydun in the guise of a dragon tests his sons, from the Shahnameh of Shah Tahmasp, attributed to Aqa Mirak, circa 1525-35

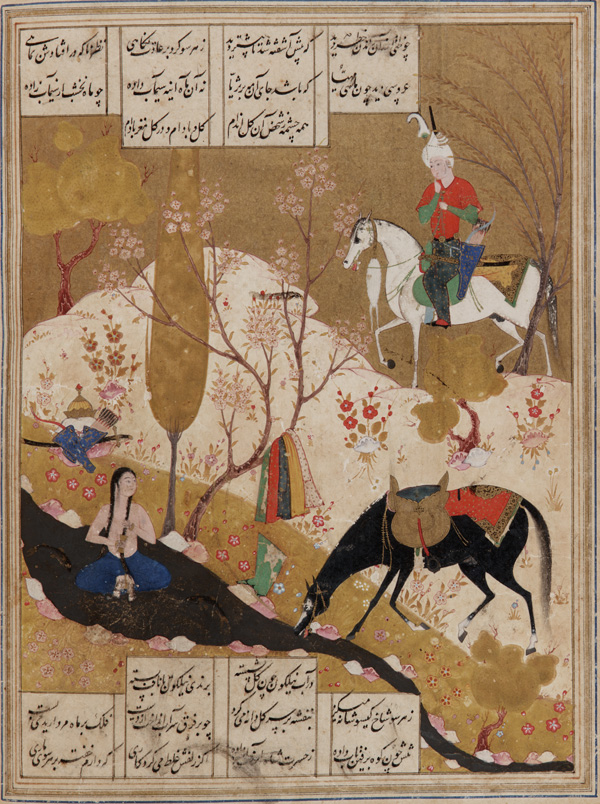
Khosraw discovers Shirin bathing in a pool, a favourite scene, here from 1548

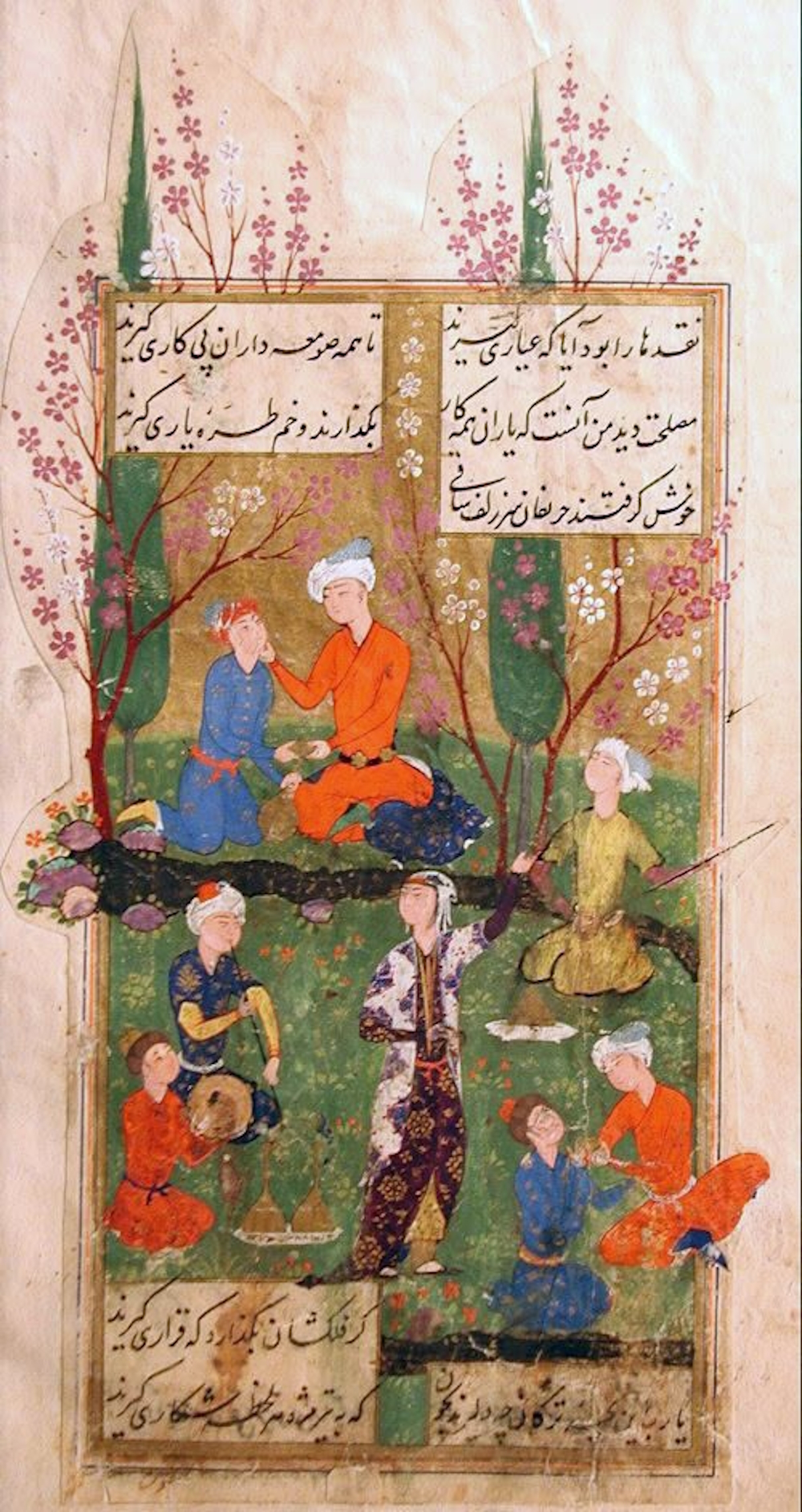
Poetry, wine and gardens are common elements in later works - 1585

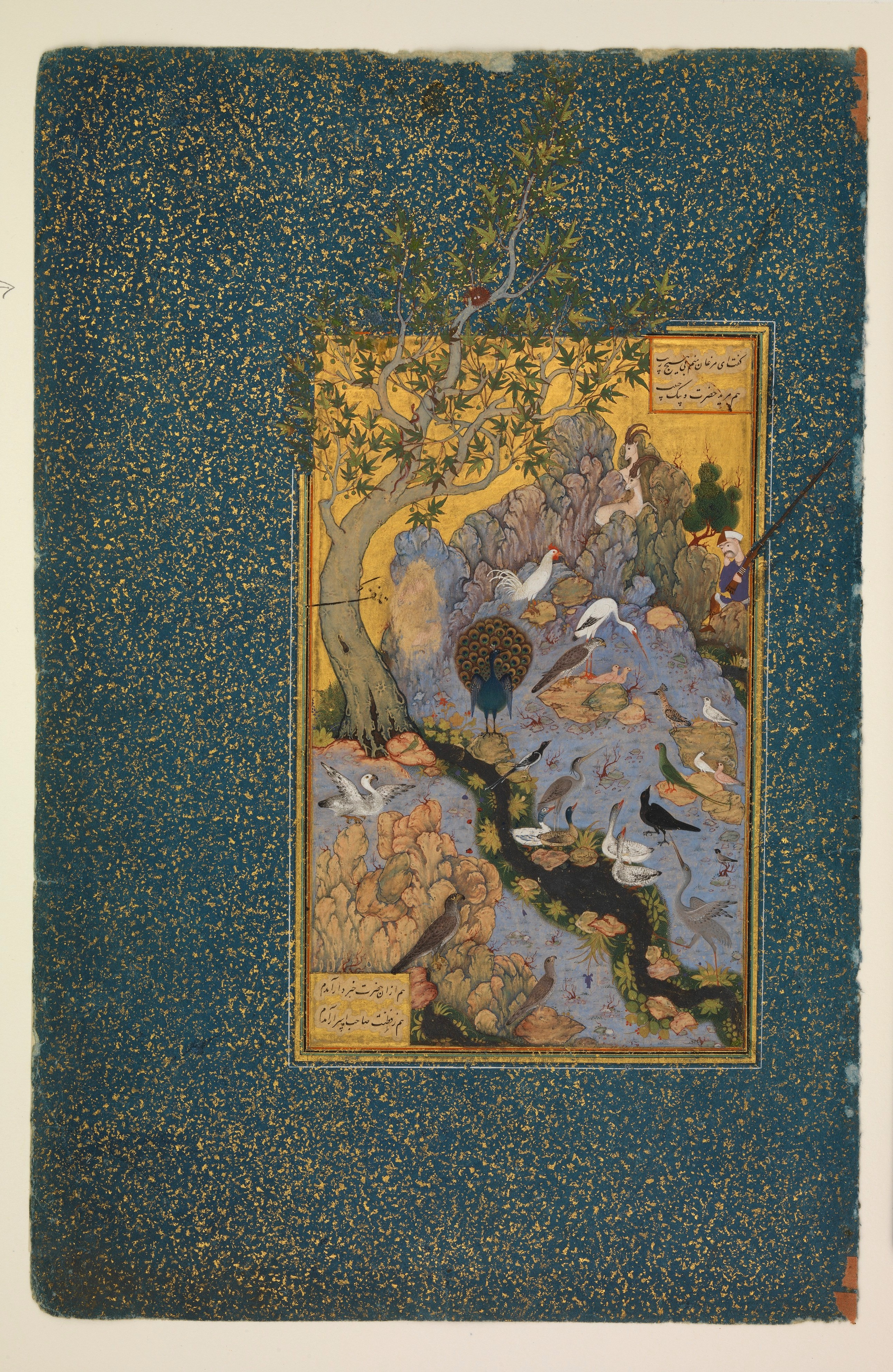
Scene from Attar's Conference of the Birds, painted c. 1600

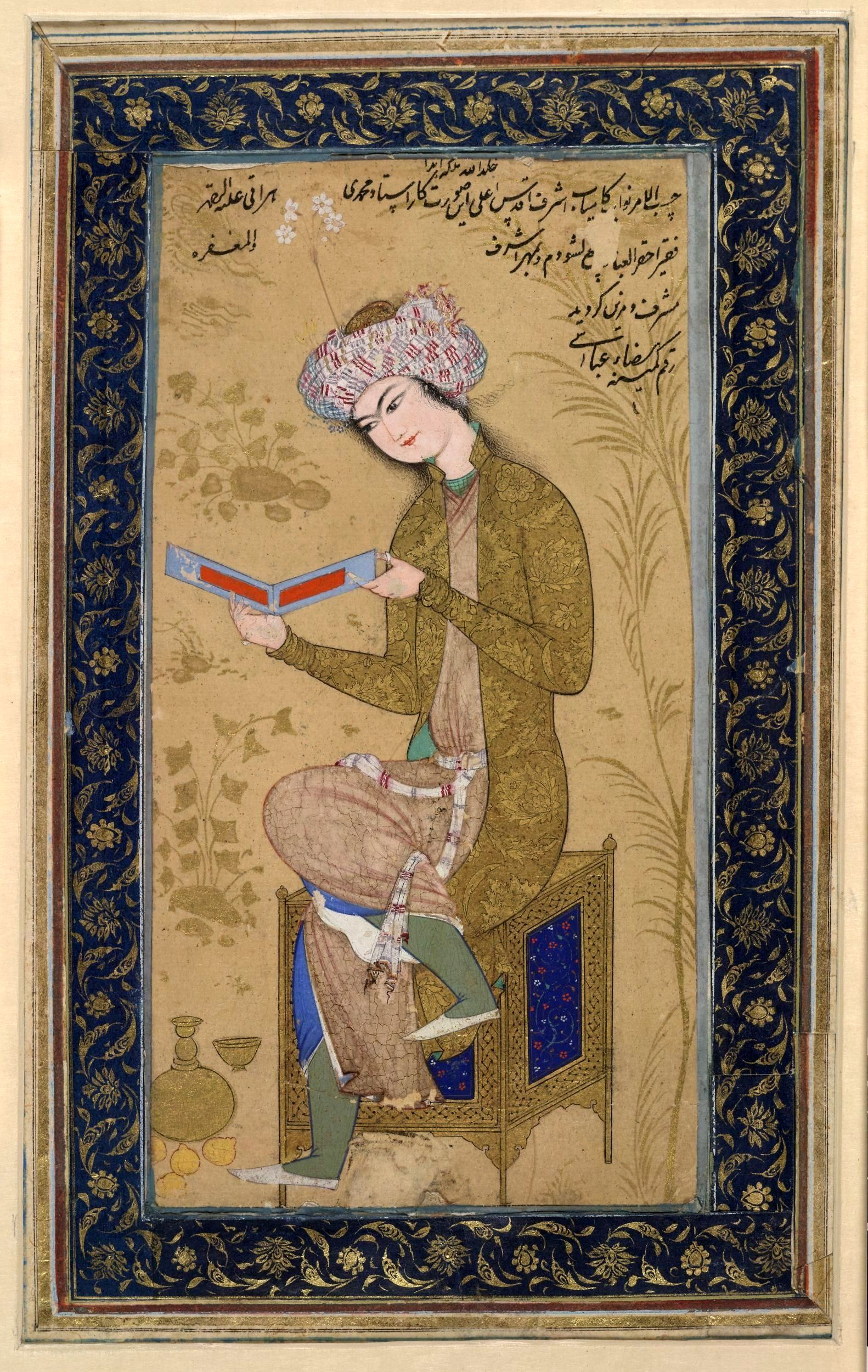
Youth reading, 1625–26 by Reza Abbasi

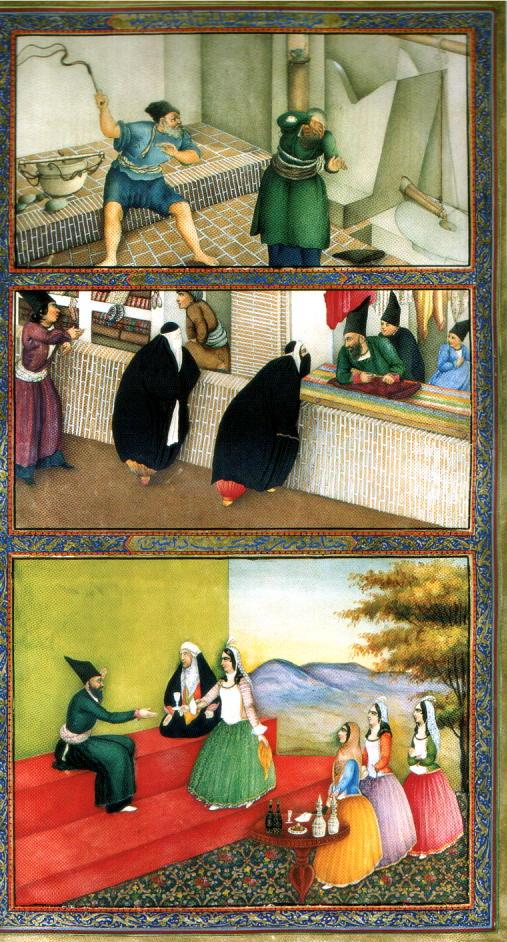
Illustration of One Thousand and One Nights by Abu'l-Hasan Sani al-Mulk, Iran, 1853

== Intangible cultural heritage ==
Art of miniature
- UNESCO Intangible Cultural Heritage
- Country: Azerbaijan, Iran, Turkey, and Uzbekistan
- Reference: 01598

Inscription history
- Inscription: 2020 (15th session)
- List: Representative

In 2020, UNESCO inscribed the art of miniature on its Representative List of the Intangible Cultural Heritage of Humanity upon the nomination of four countries in which it is an important element of their culture: Azerbaijan, Iran, Turkey, and Uzbekistan.

In their rationale for inscription on the list, the nominators highlighted that "The patterns of the miniature represent beliefs, worldviews and lifestyles in a pictorial fashion and also gained a new character through the Islamic influence. While there are stylistic differences between them, the art of miniature as practised by the submitting States Parties shares crucial features. In all cases, it is a traditional craft typically transmitted through mentor-apprentice relationships (non-formal education) and considered as an integral part of each society's social and cultural identity".

== In later culture ==
The French painter Henri Matisse said he was inspired by Persian miniatures. He visited the 1910 Munich exhibition of Persian miniatures and carpets, and noted that: "the Persian miniatures showed me the possibility of my sensations. That art had devices to suggest a greater space, a really plastic space. It helped me to get away from intimate painting".

Persian miniatures are mentioned in the novel My Name Is Red by Orhan Pamuk.

== See also ==
- Persian culture
- List of Persian painters
- Persianate
