= Tomb of Khwaju Kermani =

Tomb in Shiraz, Iran

Coordinates: 29.6360°N 52.5617°E

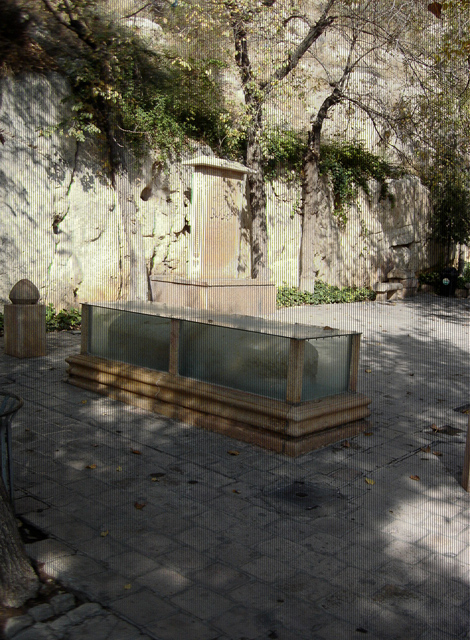
Tomb of Khwaju Kermani

Tomb of Khaju Kermani (Persian: آرامگاه خواجوی کرمانی) is the tomb of the Persian poet and Sufi mystic Khaju Kermani (1290–1349). It is located north of Shiraz, on Sabooy hill off the Shiraz–Isfahan road. It is in Allahu Akbar Gorge. His grave overlooks the Qur'an Gate. Roknabad spring passes near the tomb.

== History ==
The tomb was built in 1315 Solar (1956 AD).

The tomb is placed in an unroofed enclosure. Its headstone is in the middle of the platform. It is convex and has a bulge. On the stone is inscribed in Arabic a quotation from the Qur'an:

کل من علیها فان و یبقی وجه ربک ذوالجلال و الاکرام
kullu man ‘alayhā fān; wa-yabqā wajhu rabbika ḏu-l-jalāli wa-l-'ikrām
"Everyone who is on the earth will pass away; and there will remain only the face of your Lord, full of glory and honour."

== See also ==
- Khwaju Kermani
