= Khwaju Kermani =

Persian poet and Sufi mystic (1290–1349)

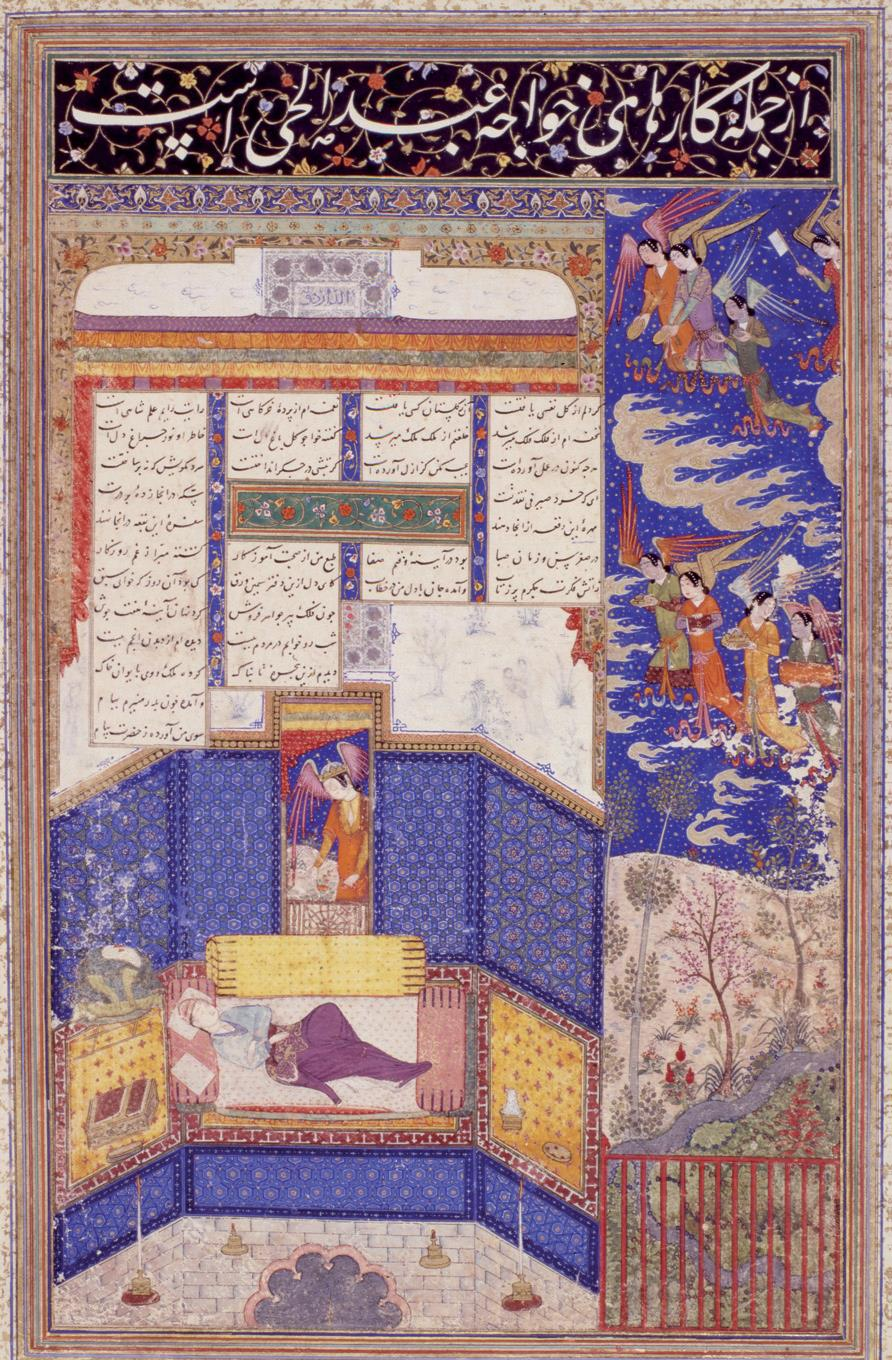
Khwaju Kermani Visited by the Angel of Inspiration in a Dream. It was the first miniature in the manuscript of Three Masnavis by Khwaju Kermani illustrated by Junayd in Baghdad in 1396 (Jalayirid dynasty). In 1543/44 Dust Muhammad removed it from the manuscript and placed in the Bahram Mirza Album (Muraqqa), now in the Topkapı Palace Museum

Khwaju Kermani (Persian: خواجوی کرمانی; December 1290 – 1349) was a famous Persian poet and Sufi mystic from Iran.

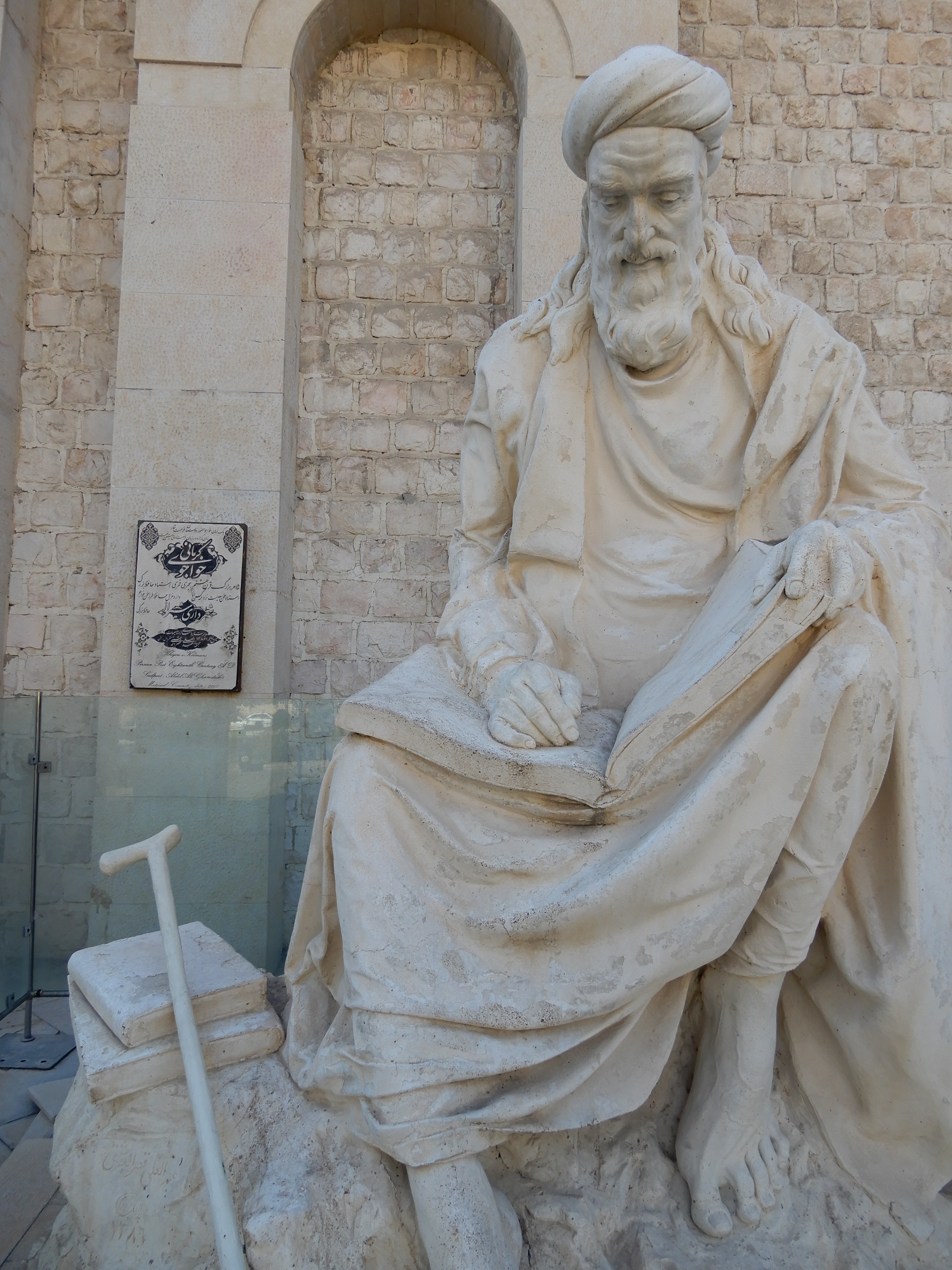
Statue of Khwaju Kermani

== Life ==
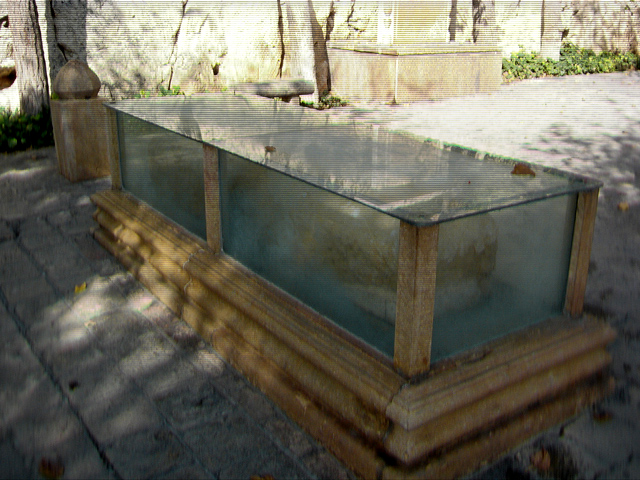
The tomb of the poet is encased in a protective glass to shield it from the elements, Shiraz

He was born in Kerman, Iran, on 24 December 1290. His nickname Khwaju is a diminutive of the Persian word Khwaja, which he used as his poetic penname. This title points to descent from a family of high social status. The nisba (name title) Morshedi displays his association with the Persian Sufi master Shaykh Abu Eshaq Kazeruni, the founder of the Morshediyya order. Khwaju died around 1349 in Shiraz, Iran, and his tomb in Shiraz is a popular tourist attraction today. In his youth he visited Egypt, Syria, Jerusalem and Iraq. He also performed the Hajj to Mecca. One purpose of his travels is said to have been education and meeting with scholars of other lands. He composed one of his best known works, Homāy o Homāyun, in Baghdad. Returning to Iranian lands in 1335, he strove to find a position as a court poet by dedicating poems to the rulers of his time, such as the Ilkhanate rulers Abu Sa'id Bahadur Khan and Arpa Ke'un, the Mozaffarid Mubariz al-Din Muhammad, and Abu Ishaq Inju of the Inju dynasty.

== Works ==
=== List of Poems ===
- Divan (Persian: دیوان خواجو) - a collection of his poems in the form of Ghazals, qasidas, strophic poems, qeṭʾas (occasional verse), and quatrains
- Homāy o Homāyun (Persian: همای و همایون) The poem relates the adventures of the Persian prince Homāy, who falls in love with the Chinese princess, Homāyun.
- Gol o Nowruz (Persian: گل و نوروز) The poem tells another love story, this time vaguely situated in the time shortly before the advent of Islam.
- Rowżat-al-anwār (Persian: روضة الانوار) In twenty poetic discources, the poet deals with requirements for the mystical path and the ethics of kingship.
- Kamāl-nām (Persian: کمال نام)
- Gowhar-nāma (Persian: گوهرنامه)
- Sām-nāma (Persian: سام نامه) A heroic epic about the grandfather of Rustam

=== Translations ===
- Homāy e Homāyun. Un romanzo d'amore e avventura dalla Persia medievale. ed. and trans. by Nahid Norozi, preface by J.C. Buergel, Milano: Mimesis, 2011

== See also ==
- List of Persian poets and authors
- Persian literature
- Khwaju Kermani tomb

== Sources ==
- Browne, E. G. (1920 [1928]). A Literary History of Persia, vol. 3: The Tartar Dominion (1265–1502). Cambridge.
- de Bruijn, J. T. P. (2009). "Ḵᵛāju Kermāni". Encyclopaedia Iranica.
- Norozi, Nahid (2018). "Khvājū Kirmānī". In Fleet, Kate; Krämer, Gudrun; Matringe, Denis; Nawas, John; Rowson, Everett (eds.). Encyclopaedia of Islam (3rd ed.). Brill Online. ISSN 1873-9830.
- Jan Rypka, History of Iranian Literature. Reidel Publishing Company. ASIN B-000-6BXVT-K
