= Al-Hakim Mosque =

Mosque in Cairo, Egypt

- مسجد الحاكم
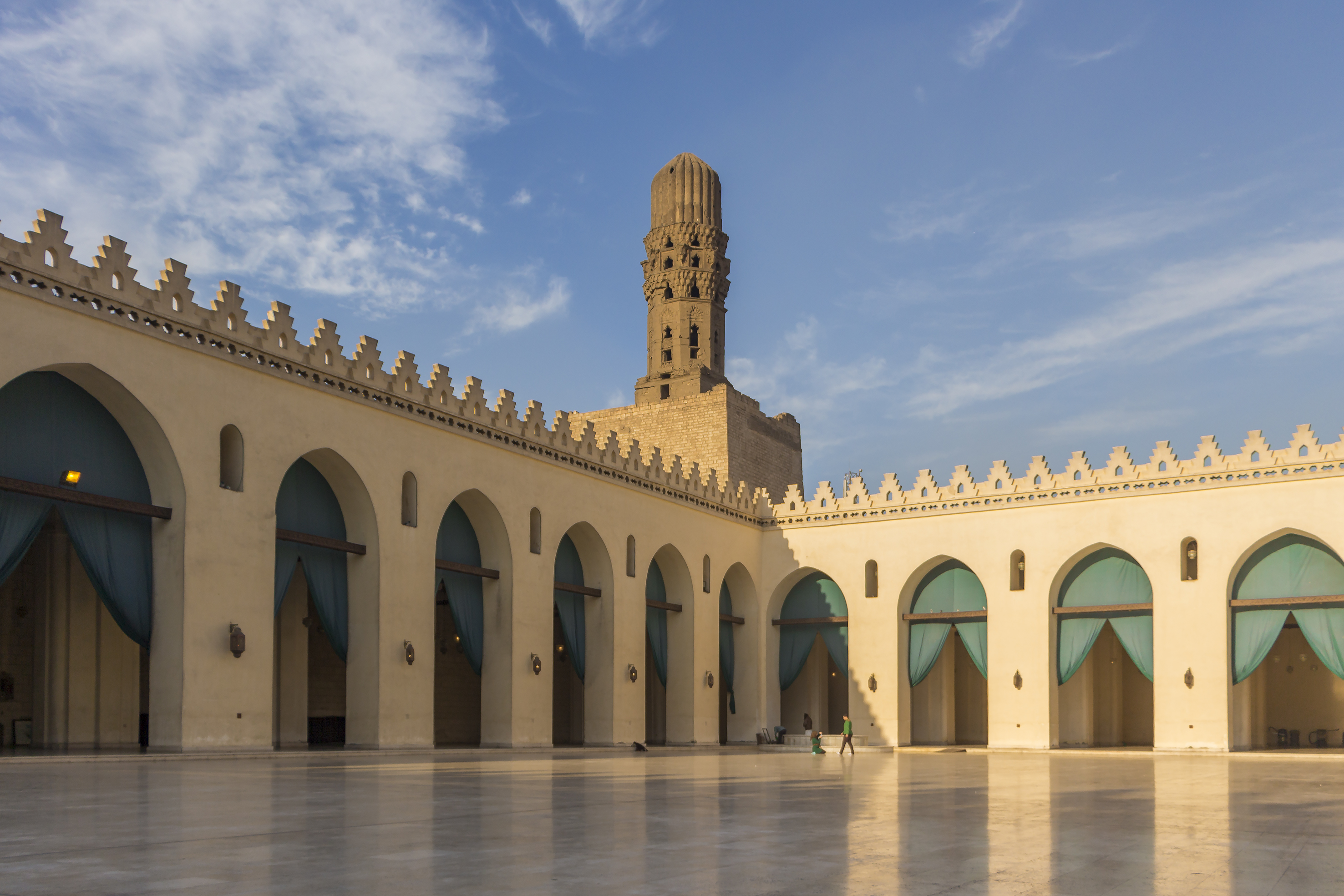
- Interior courtyard of the mosque

Religion
- Affiliation: Islam
- Ecclesiastical or organisational status: Mosque
- Status: Active

Location
- Location: al-Muʿizz Street, Islamic Cairo
- Country: Egypt
- Interactive map of Al-Hakim Mosque
- Coordinates: 30°03′16″N 31°15′50″E

Architecture
- Type: Mosque
- Style: Fatimid
- Founder: Al-Aziz Billah; Al-Hakim bi-Amr Allah
- Groundbreaking: 990 CE
- Completed: 1013 CE

Specifications
- Dome: 1
- Minaret: 2
- Minaret height: 24.7–33.7 m (81–111 ft)
- Materials: Stone; bricks; white marble; gold trim

The al-Hakim Mosque (Arabic: مسجد الحاكم, romanized: Masjid al-Ḥākim), also known as al-Anwar (Arabic: الانور, lit. 'the Illuminated'), is a mosque in Cairo, Egypt. It is named after al-Ḥākim bi-Amr Allāh (985–1021), the 6th Fatimid caliph and 16th Ismāʿīlī Imam. Construction of the mosque was originally started by Caliph al-ʿAziz, the son of al-Muʿizz and the father of al-Ḥākim, in 990 CE. It was completed in 1013 by al-Ḥākim, which is why it is named after him.

The mosque is located in Islamic Cairo, on the east side of al-Muʿizz Street, just south of Bab al-Futuh (the northern city gate). In the centuries since its construction, the mosque was often neglected and re-purposed for other functions, eventually falling into ruin. In 1980, a major restoration and reconstruction of the mosque was completed by the Dawoodi Bohras, resulting in its reopening for religious use.

Architecturally, the mosque consists of a hypostyle prayer hall and a wide internal courtyard (sahn), accessed via a projecting entrance portal. Its most notable features are its two unusual minarets: the original minarets of the mosque have ornate multi-tiered designs but, for reasons that remain unclear, these were encased shortly afterwards inside the massive square bastions still seen today.

== History ==
=== Fatimid construction and modifications ===
The mosque's construction was initiated by the 5th Fatimid caliph al-ʿAziz Billah in the year 990 CE and the first Friday prayers took place in it a year later, though the building was incomplete. This suggests that the prayer hall or sanctuary, the area where prayers were led, was probably built first. His successor, al-Ḥākim bi-Amr Allāh, and his overseer Abu Muhammad al-Hafiz 'Abd al-Ghani ibn Sa'id al-Misri, resumed construction work in 1002–1003. In 1010, the minarets were modified by the construction of large square bastions around them, which hid much of the original towers. The chronology of construction in the mosque's interior and the determination of exactly which part was built by which patron, is uncertain.

Finally, its inauguration took place in Ramadan, 1013 CE. It measured 120 by 113 metres (394 by 371 ft) when it was finished and was more than double the size of the al-Azhar Mosque. Al-Hakim allocated 40,000 dinars to the construction and then another 5,000 dinars to its furnishings. The al-Hakim Mosque was also known by an epithet, al-Anwar ('the Illuminated'), similar in style to the name of the earlier al-Azhar Mosque founded by the Fatimids. At the time of inauguration, al-Hakim permitted a celebratory procession which made its way from al-Azhar to al-Anwar and from al-Anwar back to al-Azhar.

The mosque originally stood outside the walls of Cairo, but when the Fatimid vizier Badr al-Jamali rebuilt and extended the city walls in 1087, the northern side of the mosque, including its minaret, was incorporated into the northern city wall (between the newly built gates of Bab al-Futuh and Bab al-Nasr). A ziyada, or a walled outer enclosure, was also added around the mosque later, begun by Caliph al-Zahir (r. 1021–1036) but completed much later under the Ayyubid sultan al-Salih Najm al-Din (r. 1240–1249) and the Mamluk sultan Aybak (r. 1250–1257).

=== Post-Fatimid era ===
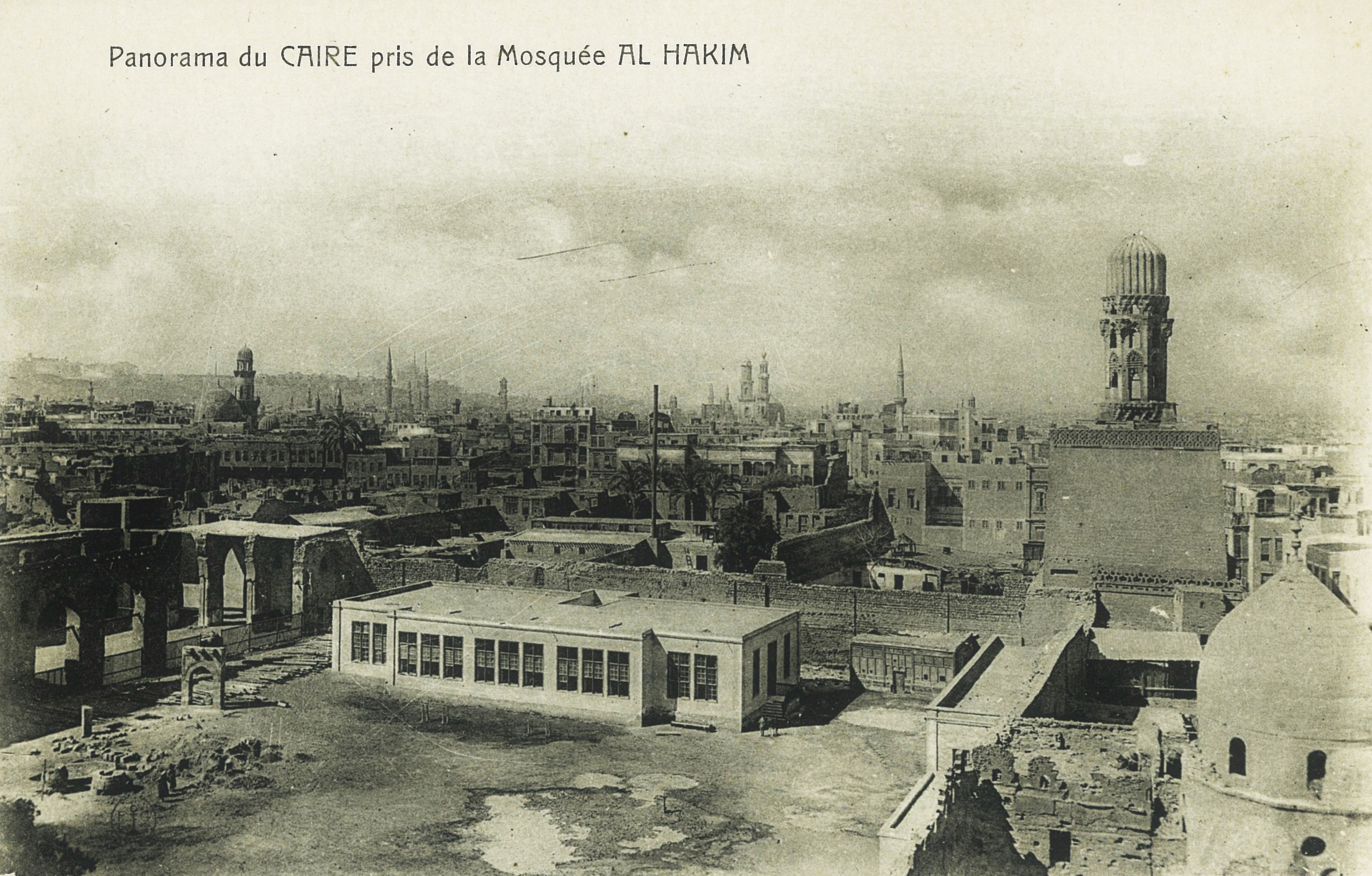
The mosque in the 1890s, before its restoration in 1980

In 1303, during the Mamluk period, the mosque was severely damaged by an earthquake and was subsequently restored by Sultan Baybars II al-Jashankir. By that time, the mosque was also being used to teach Islamic law from the four Sunni maddhabs. In 1360, the mosque was restored again by Sultan Hasan. In the 15th century, a merchant sponsored the construction of a third minaret for the mosque, though this minaret has not been preserved.

The interior of the mosque fell into ruin over many centuries until its modern renovation, and the building was only intermittently used as a mosque. At various times, it was used as a prison for captured Franks (i.e. Latin crusaders) during the Crusades, as a stable by Saladin, as a fortress by Napoleon, as an Islamic arts Museum in 1890, and as a boys' school in the 20th century during Nasser's presidency. In the early 19th century, the mosque underwent a restoration sponsored by 'Umar Makram. The restoration also added a small mihrab to the interior that is still preserved today, dated to 1808.

=== 20th century restoration ===
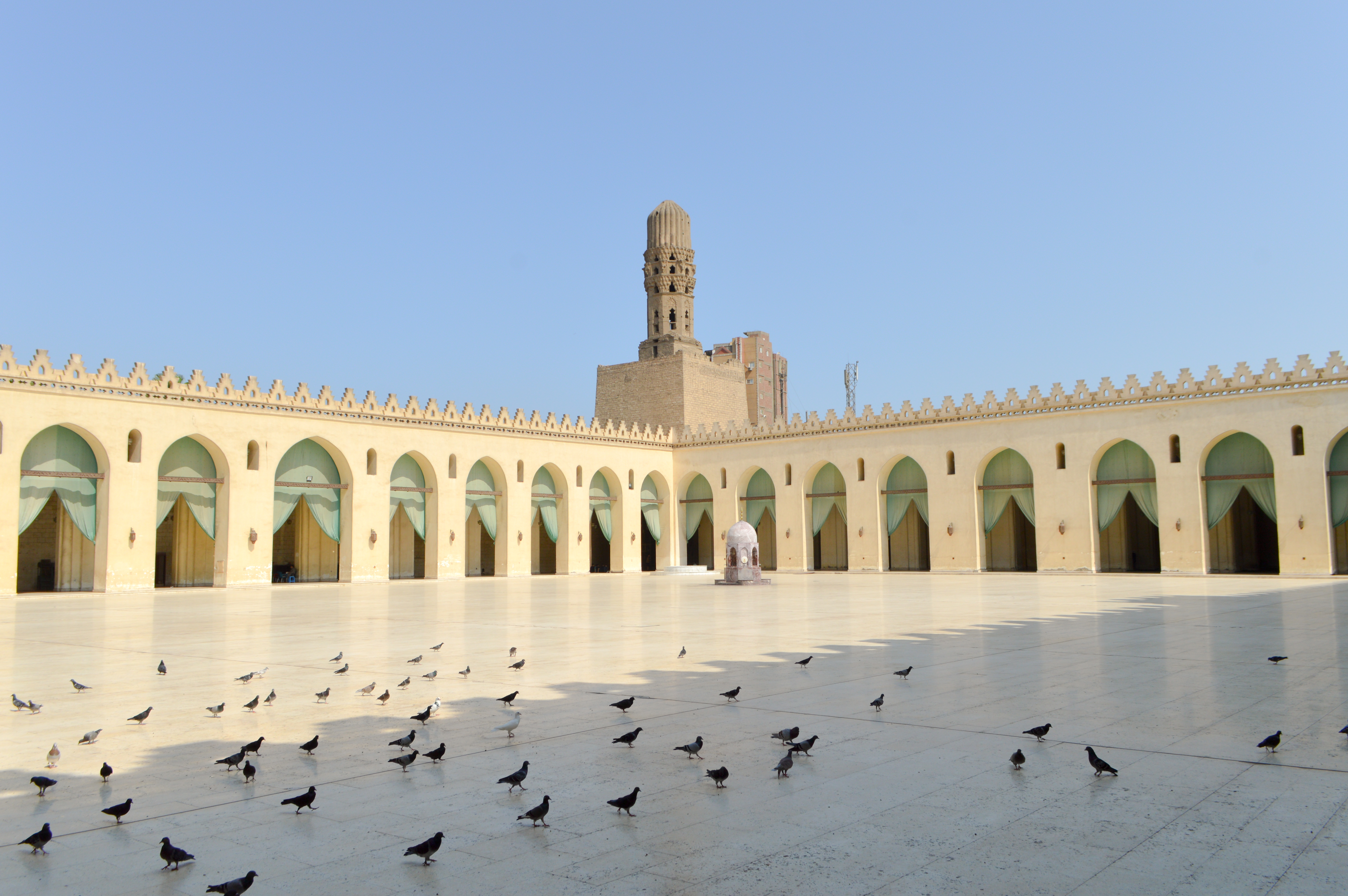
The mosque sahn in 2018

In 1980, the mosque was extensively reconstructed and refurbished in white marble and gold trim by Mohammed Burhanuddin, the head of the Dawoodi Bohra, an international Shia sect based in India. The restoration took 27 months and the mosque was officially re-opened on 24 November 1980, in a ceremony attended by Egyptian president Anwar Sadat, Mohammed Burhanuddin, and other high-ranking Egyptian officials.

Remnants of the original decorations, including stucco carvings, timber tie-beams, and Quranic inscriptions were preserved, but most of the mosque's present interior dates from this reconstruction. Among other things, the restoration introduced a new marble mihrab whose motifs imitated the appearance of the Fatimid-era stucco mihrab in the al-Azhar Mosque. It also involved the demolition of the Mamluk-era tomb of Qurqumas, which stood right in front of the mosque and which was subsequently relocated to the Northern Cemetery.

The use of "unauthentic" materials and additions during the restoration has been criticized by scholars and conservationists, particularly when judged by the standards of the Venice Charter. The issue has elicited scholarly debate about the relative merits of different philosophies on the restoration and reconstruction of historic sites. Some scholars, like James Roy King and Bernard O'Kane, have noted that the restoration has at least had the benefit of converting the building from a ruin to a functioning mosque that can be visited by anyone, even if some of the details of the restoration remain problematic.

=== 21st century ===
In 2017, a new restoration project began, undertaken through a partnership between the Dawoodi Bohra community and the Ministry of Tourism and Antiquities. The project encompassed various tasks such as addressing water damage, strengthening wooden structures, refurbishing chandeliers, installing security cameras, and updating electrical wiring. Efforts were made to restore the mosque's facades, marble floors, and interior inscriptions. The mosque was reopened after restorations in February 2023; and in June 2023, the Prime Minister of India, Narendra Modi visited the mosque with the Prime Minister of Egypt, Mostafa Madbouly, and son of Mufaddal Saifuddin, Husain Burhanuddin.

== Architecture ==
=== General layout ===
Floor plan of the mosque

The facades and minarets of the mosque are made from stone, while the rest of the structure is made of brick. The mosque's rectangular layout consists of an open courtyard surrounded by arcades (riwaqs) on four sides. Behind these arcades are roofed areas divided into aisles by more arcades that run parallel to the sides of the courtyard. The space on the northwest side of the courtyard (the entrance side) is two aisles deep, the spaces along its southwest and northeast sides are three aisles deep, and the main prayer hall on the southeast side is five aisles deep. This layout is similar to the layout of the older Ibn Tulun Mosque and the al-Azhar Mosque. A special aisle, running perpendicular to the others, cuts across the five aisles of the prayer hall and leads towards the mihrab (niche indicating the qibla or direction of prayer). This central aisle is further emphasized by its greater width and height, as well as by the presence of a dome, carried on squinches, that covers the space directly in front of the mihrab. In addition to the main mihrab (which dates entirely from the 1980 restoration), another smaller mihrab to the right, covered in polychrome marble, was added by 'Umar Makram in 1808.

An unusual feature of the mosque is the monumental main entrance (on the western side) with its projecting stone portal, similar to the older Fatimid-built Great Mosque of Mahdia in present-day Tunisia and most likely similar to the original entrance (no longer extant) of al-Azhar Mosque. The decoration and high-quality stonework of the portal, however, was quite different from that of other Fatimid mosques of this period. Scholar Doris Behrens-Abouseif suggests that this may be due to the employ of foreign craftsmen, perhaps from Syria. The mosque's original Fatimid portal has not been preserved; the current portal was reconstructed during the mosque's modern restoration according to earlier descriptions provided by K. A. C. Creswell.

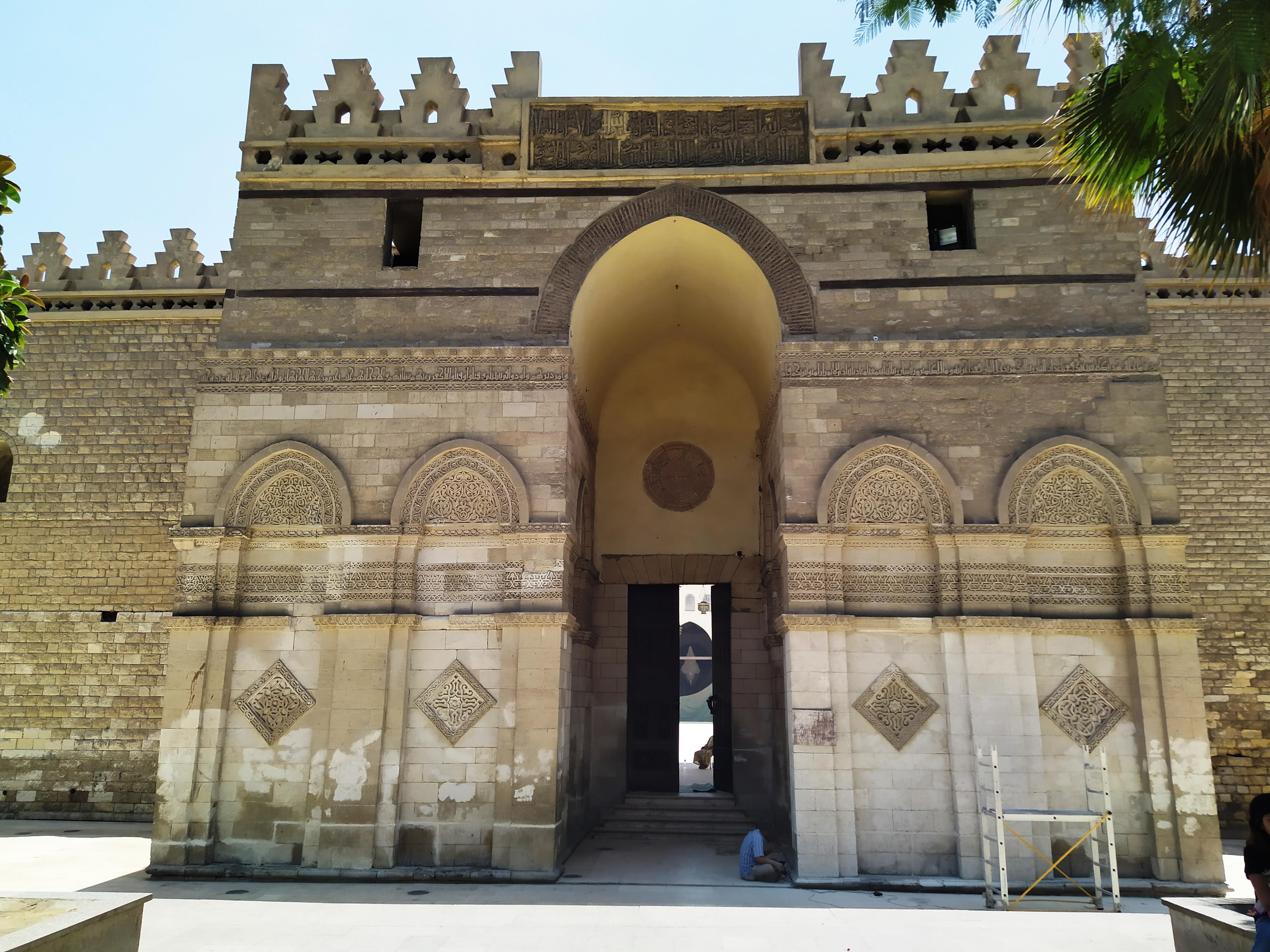
Main entrance of the mosque

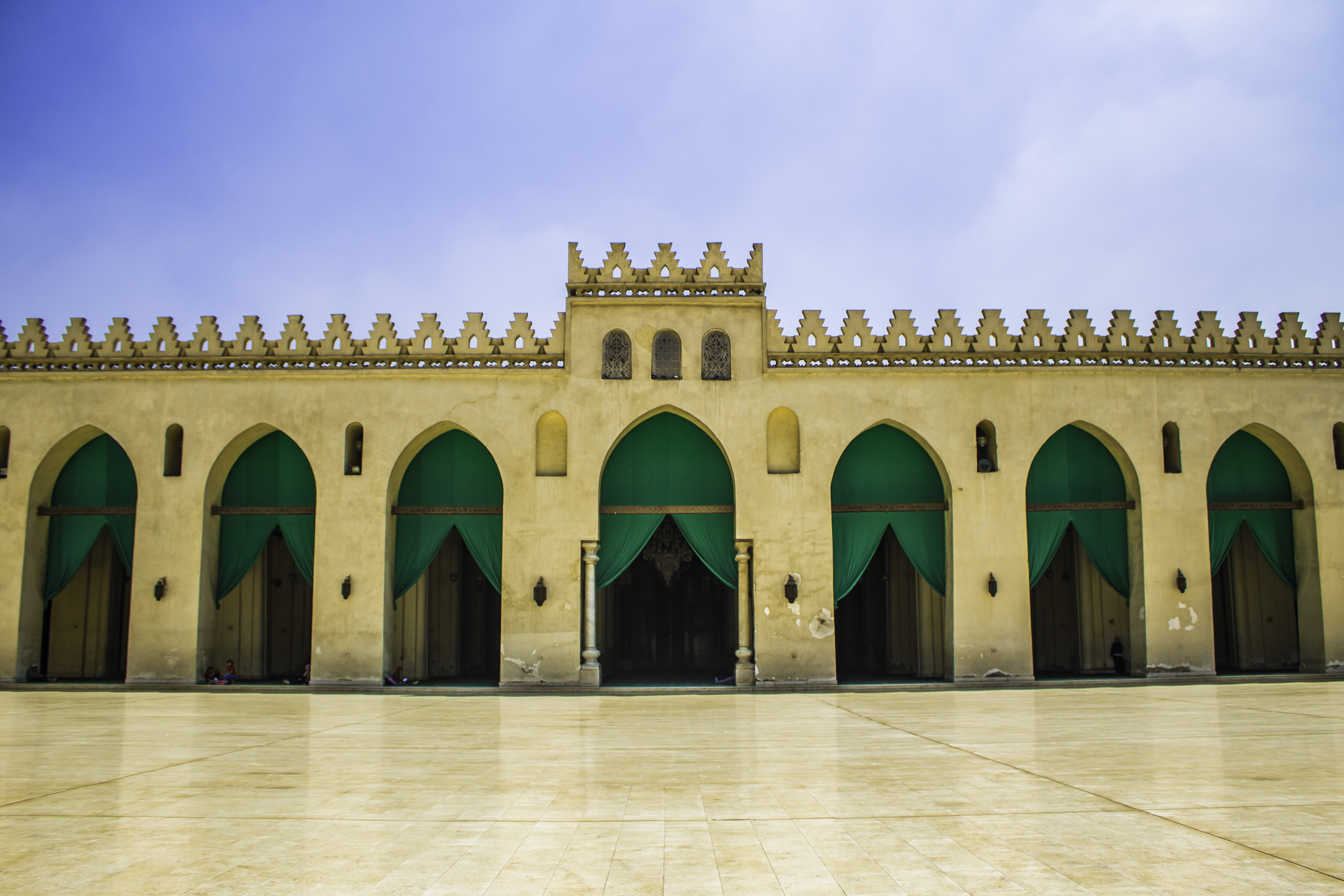
Courtyard of the mosque, looking towards the southeast to the central aisle of the prayer hall

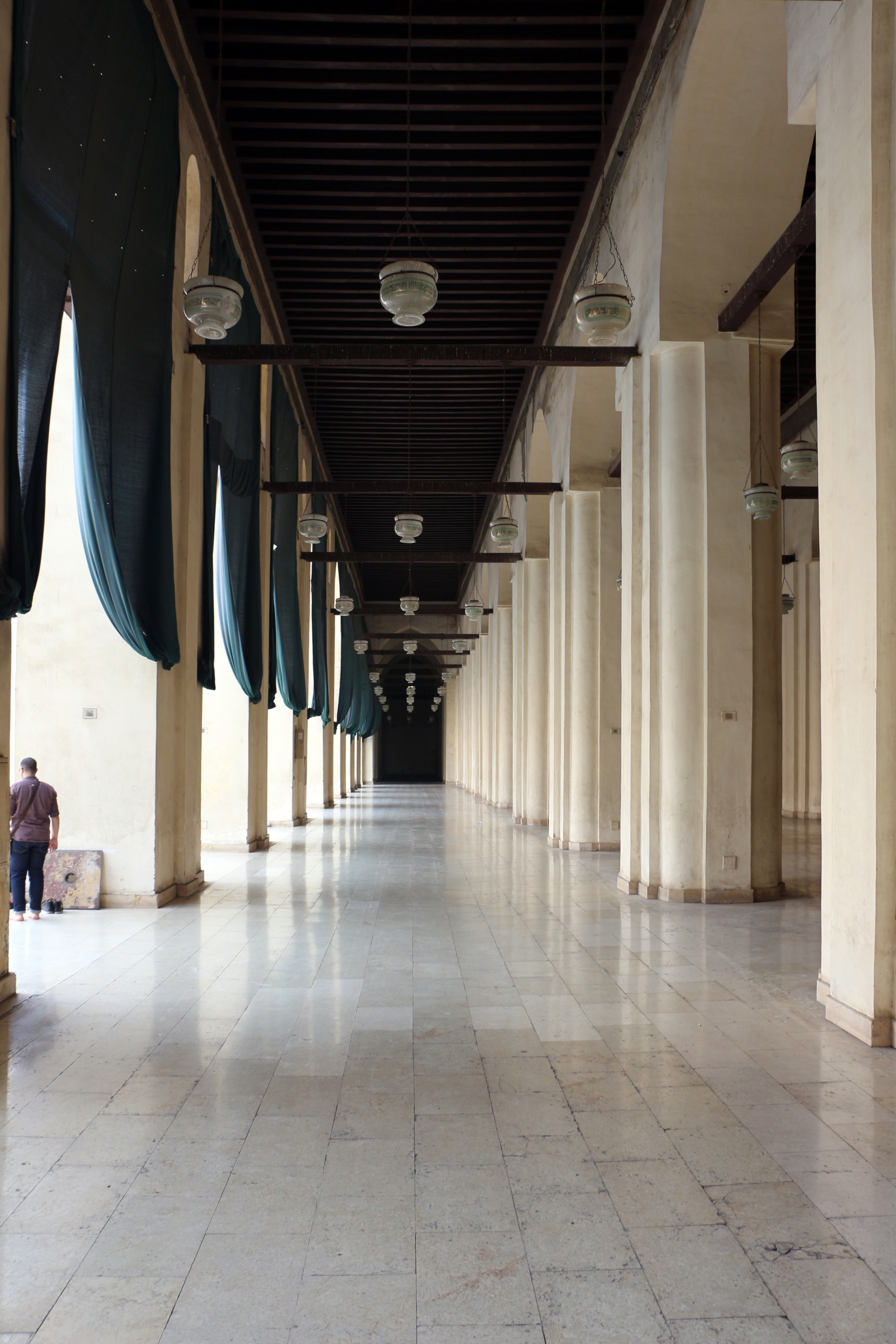
Interior of the mosque's prayer hall (mostly reconstructed in the 1980 restoration)

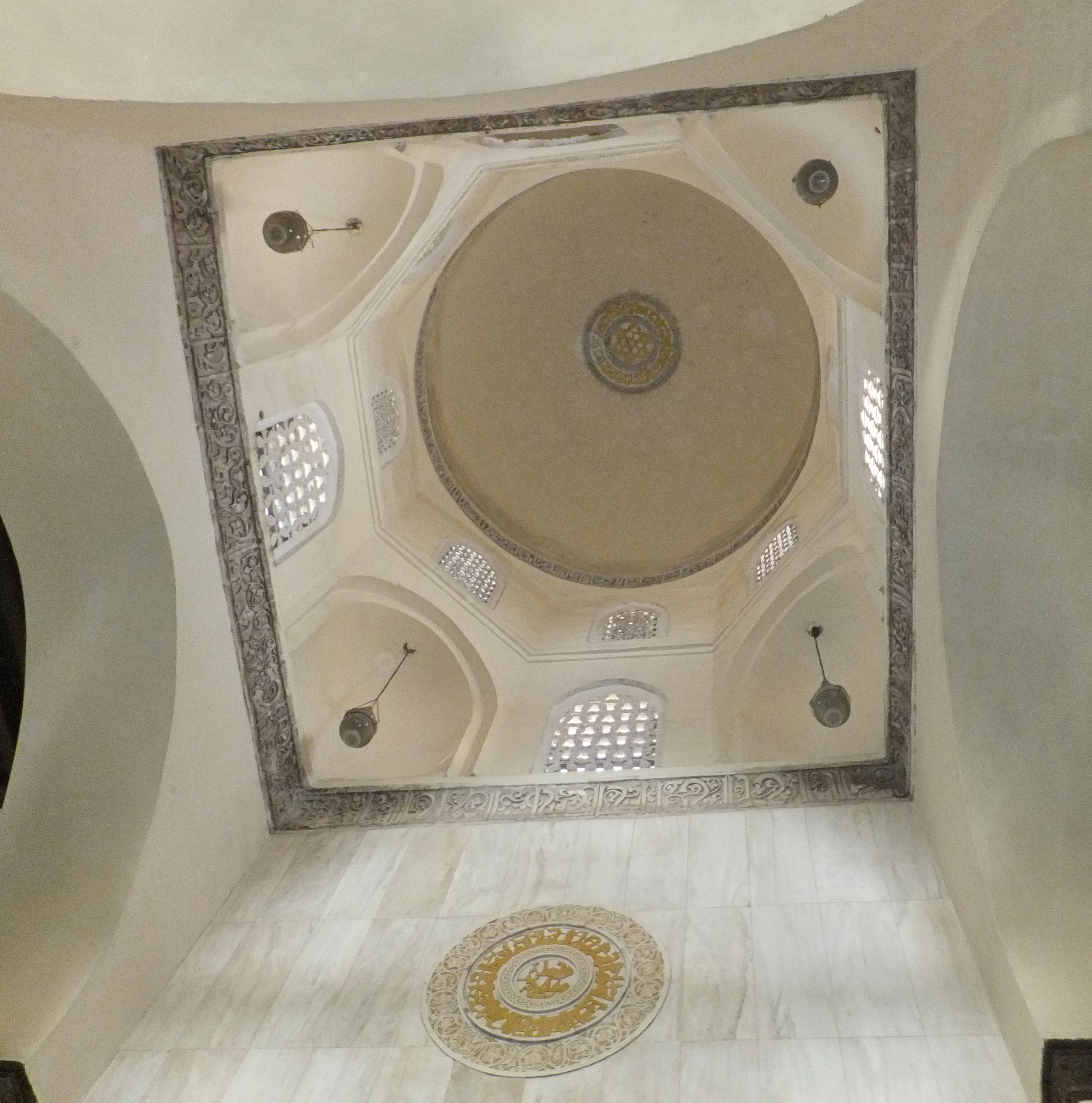
The dome over the mihrab is considered to be earliest surviving Muslim dome over a mihrab in Egypt.

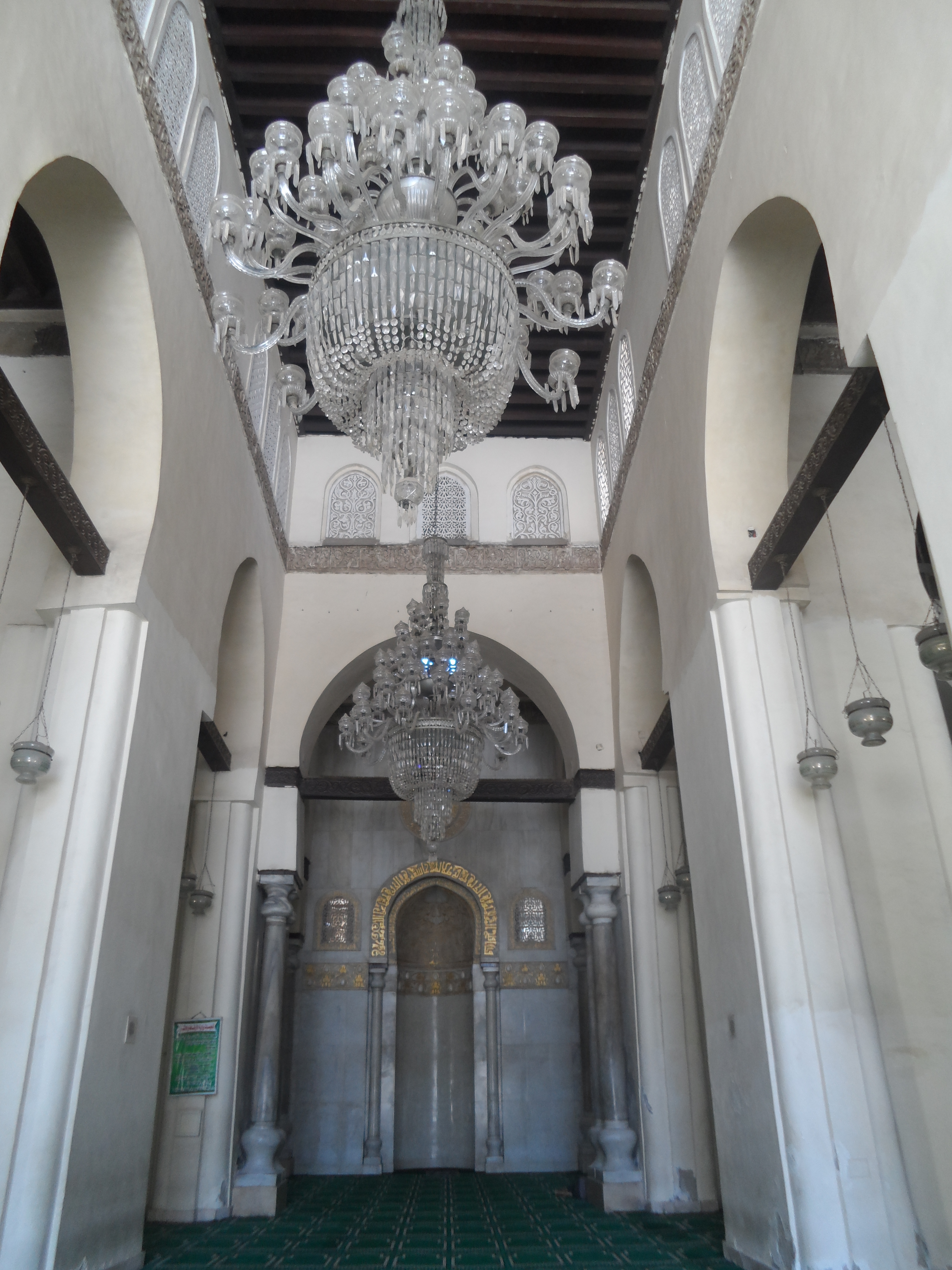
The central aisle leading to the mihrab

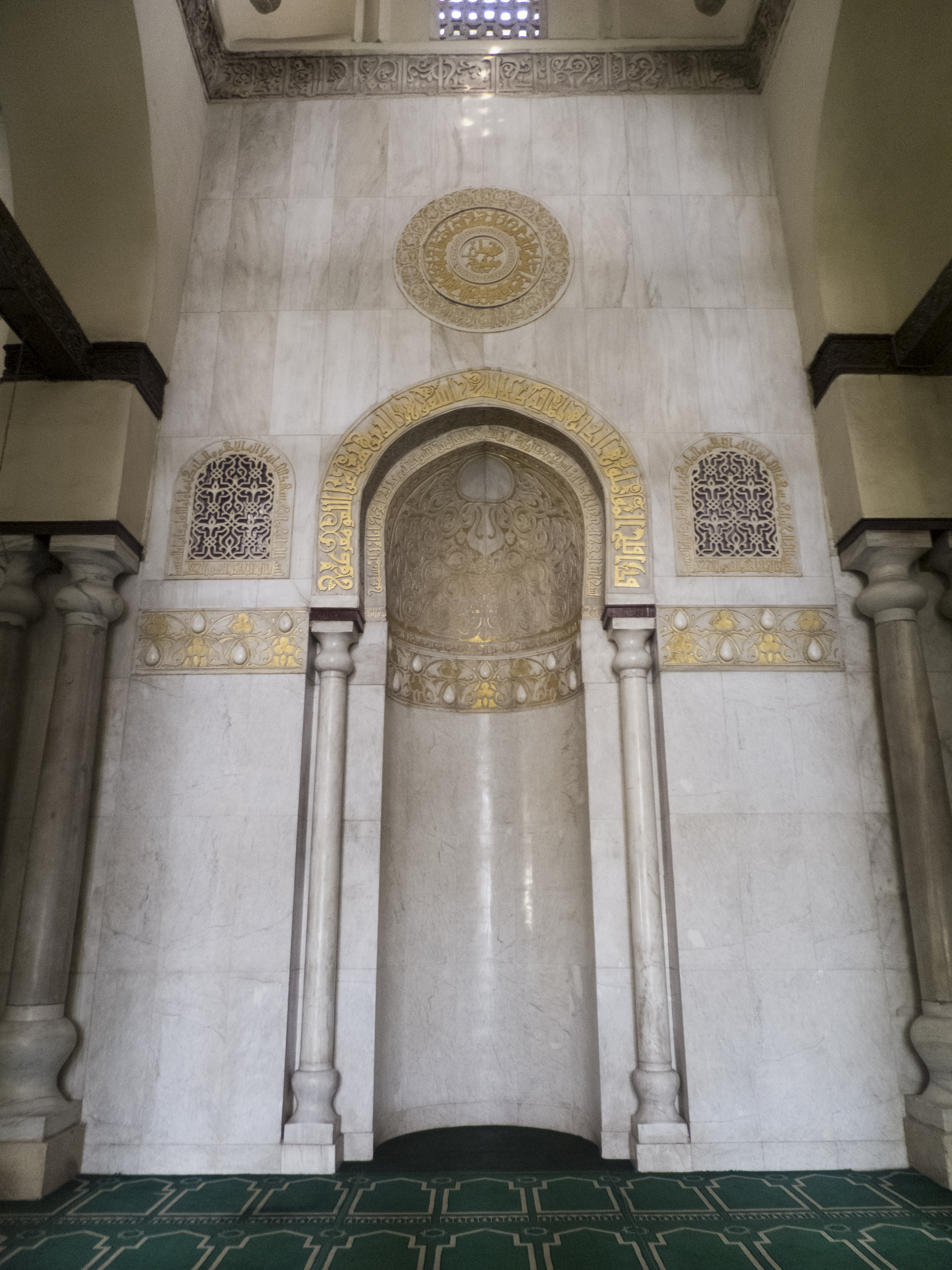
Main mihrab of the mosque (dating from the 1980 restoration)

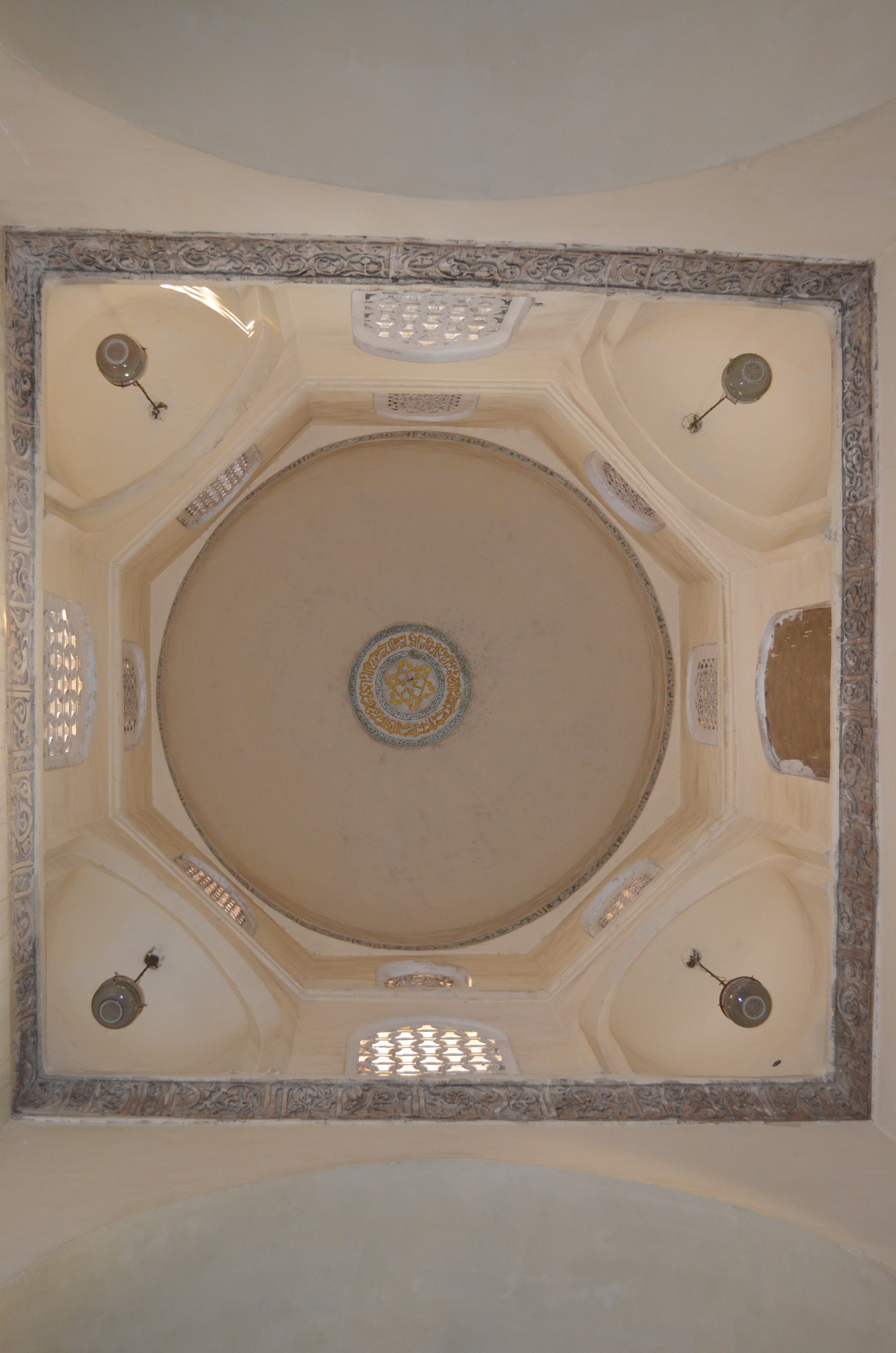
Dome in front of the mihrab

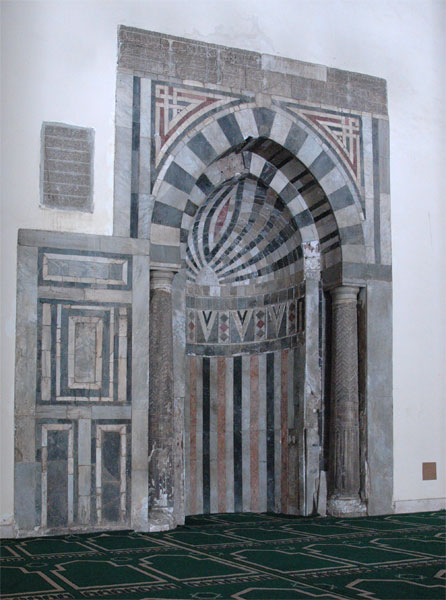
Smaller mihrab dating to 1808, near the main mihrab

=== The minarets ===
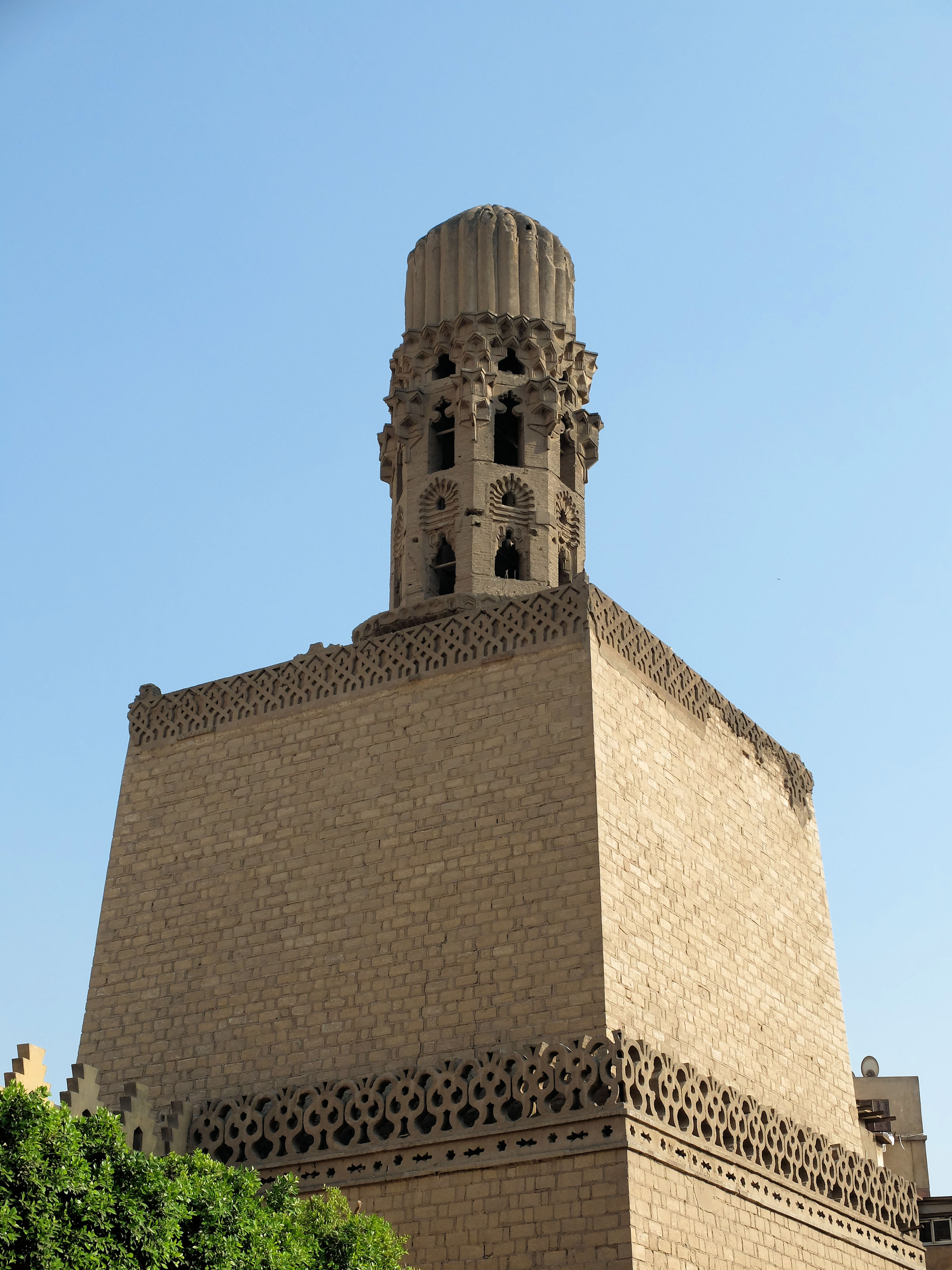
The southern minaret

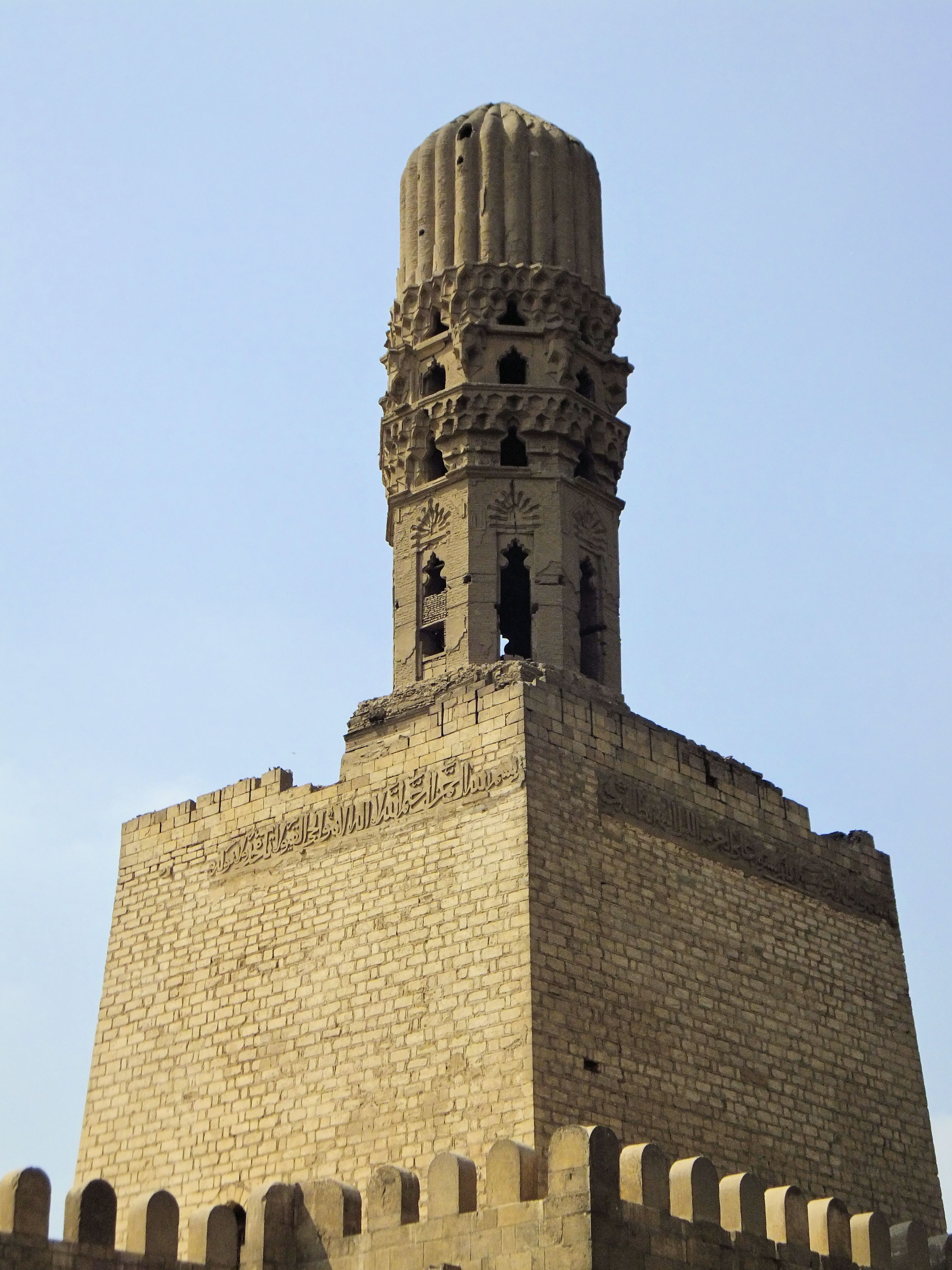
The northern minaret

The most spectacular feature of the mosque is the minarets on either side of the facade. The northern minaret is 33.7 metres (111 ft) high while the southern minaret is 24.7 metres (81 ft) high. The minarets were originally built in 1003, but the massive bastion towers or salients (referred to as arkān in Arabic sources) that define their lower parts today were added in 1010, after their initial construction, for reasons that remain unclear. The two bastions, built of brick, are shaped like two superimposed cubic sections with an austere appearance and little decoration. The center of these bastions is hollow, as they were built around the original towers, whose original lower levels have been preserved inside. The inner towers are braced against the outer towers by supporting arches between them.

The outer wall of the southern encasing bastion also features an Arabic inscription in foliated Kufic carved in marble, from the Fatimid period. The top edge of this bastion's lower section also has ornate crenellations designed in an interlacing motif that resembles the crenellations found at the older Ibn Tulun Mosque. The northern minaret was later incorporated into the city wall by Badr al-Jamali in 1087, at which point the Kufic inscription on its encasing bastion was either moved to or recarved on the outside of the city wall.

The inner (original) minaret towers have a multi-tier design with different forms: the northern minaret has a square base and a cylindrical shaft above it, whereas the southern minaret is composed of a taller square base with an octagonal shaft above it. These sections, now hidden, have extensive carved decoration: the northern tower with horizontal bands with lozenge motifs, whereas the southern tower has decoration similar to the mosque's main entrance, including a carved inscription in floriated Kufic that mentions al-Hakim's name and the date of construction. The design of these towers was highly original and would have made them distinctive from other minarets that existed in this part of the Islamic world at the time.

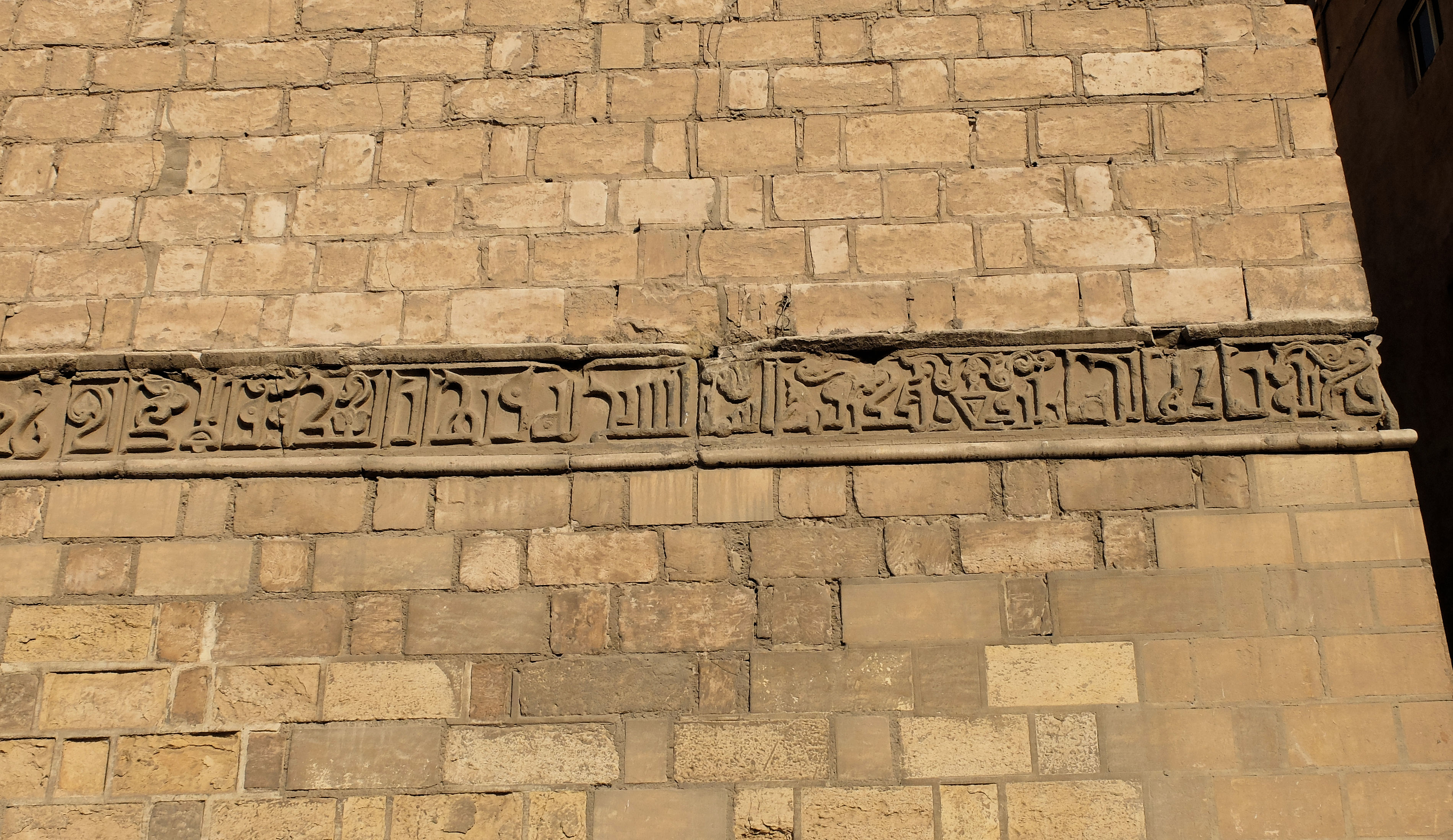
Floriated Kufic inscription band on the southern minaret (1010)

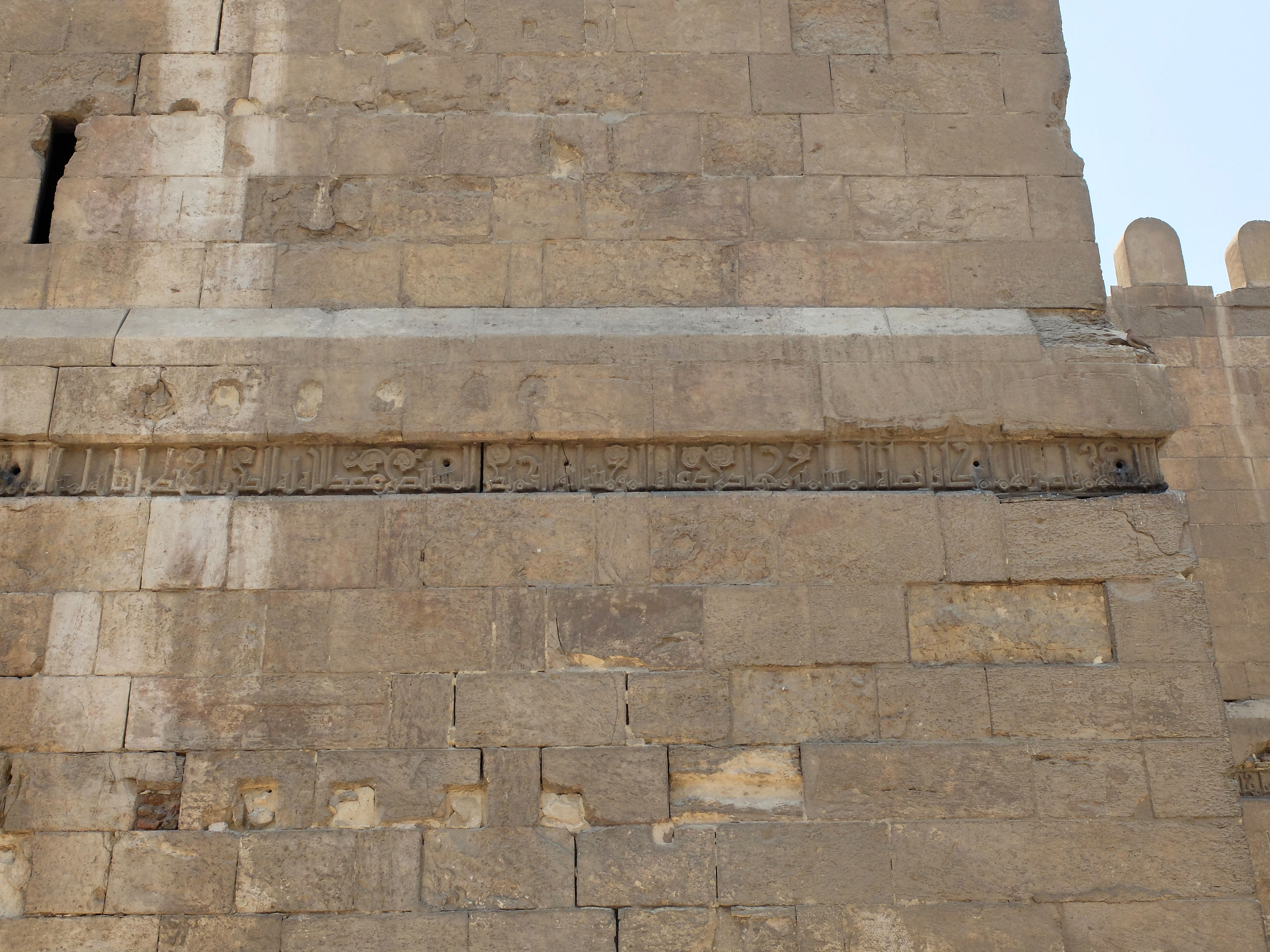
Kufic inscription from the northern minaret, moved next to Bab al-Futuh circa 1087

The reasons behind al-Hakim's decision to encase the original minarets in thick outer walls, while still preserving the original towers inside, have been debated by scholars. Bernard O'Kane has proposed that the reason for the unusual decision to encase the minarets in these bastions may have been political and symbolic. At the time of construction, the only other mosques that had multiple minarets and had minarets with multi-level designs were the Haram Mosque in Mecca and the Prophet's Mosque in Medina, both located in the Hijaz under Fatimid control at the time. O'Kane suggests that the minarets of al-Hakim's Mosque were designed to reflect and symbolize Fatimid sovereignty over those holy sites at the time. However, by 1010, the ruler of Mecca had rejected Fatimid authority in support of a rebellion in the Palestine region, thus undermining Fatimid claims over those sites. Accordingly, al-Hakim may have ordered the new minarets in Cairo to be hidden in order to obscure this embarrassing political setback. In another analysis, art historian Jennifer Pruitt suggested that the modification to the minarets was due to al-Hakim's shifting ideologies and policies in his later reign. Both Pruitt and Jonathan Bloom note that the inscriptions on the original minaret towers (from 1003), which include Qur'anic verses that feature prominently in the Ismai'ili ta'wīl of the Qur'an, differ strongly from the inscriptions on the outer towers (from 1010), which include Qur'anic verses that are focused on universal justice and on criticizing unbelievers. According to Pruitt, these latter inscriptions are relevant to al-Hakim's puritanical policies in his later years as well as his unusual order to destroy the Church of the Holy Sepulchre, which happened around the same time in 1009 or 1010. She also notes the austerity of the encasing bastions in contrast with the richly decorated original towers, as well as their resemblance to other Sunni (i.e. non-Fatimid) minarets of the era. Accordingly, she suggests that al-Hakim's decision to obscure the original minarets was part of his complex shift away from traditional Fatimid Isma'ili doctrines, his re-imagining of himself as a universal ruler and purveyor of justice, and his will to symbolize this in his architectural program.

The upper parts of the minarets, which extend above the thick square towers that encase their lower sections and are visible today, have octagonal bodies culminating in a "mabkhara"-style head with carved muqarnas decoration. They are similar in design but not identical. These tops were rebuilt by the Mamluk sultan Baybars II al-Jashankir after an earthquake in 1303 and reflect an early Mamluk style instead of an original Fatimid style. An Arabic inscription band in Naskhi script on the outer eastern flank of the northern minaret likely dates from the time of Baybars II.

=== Inscriptions ===
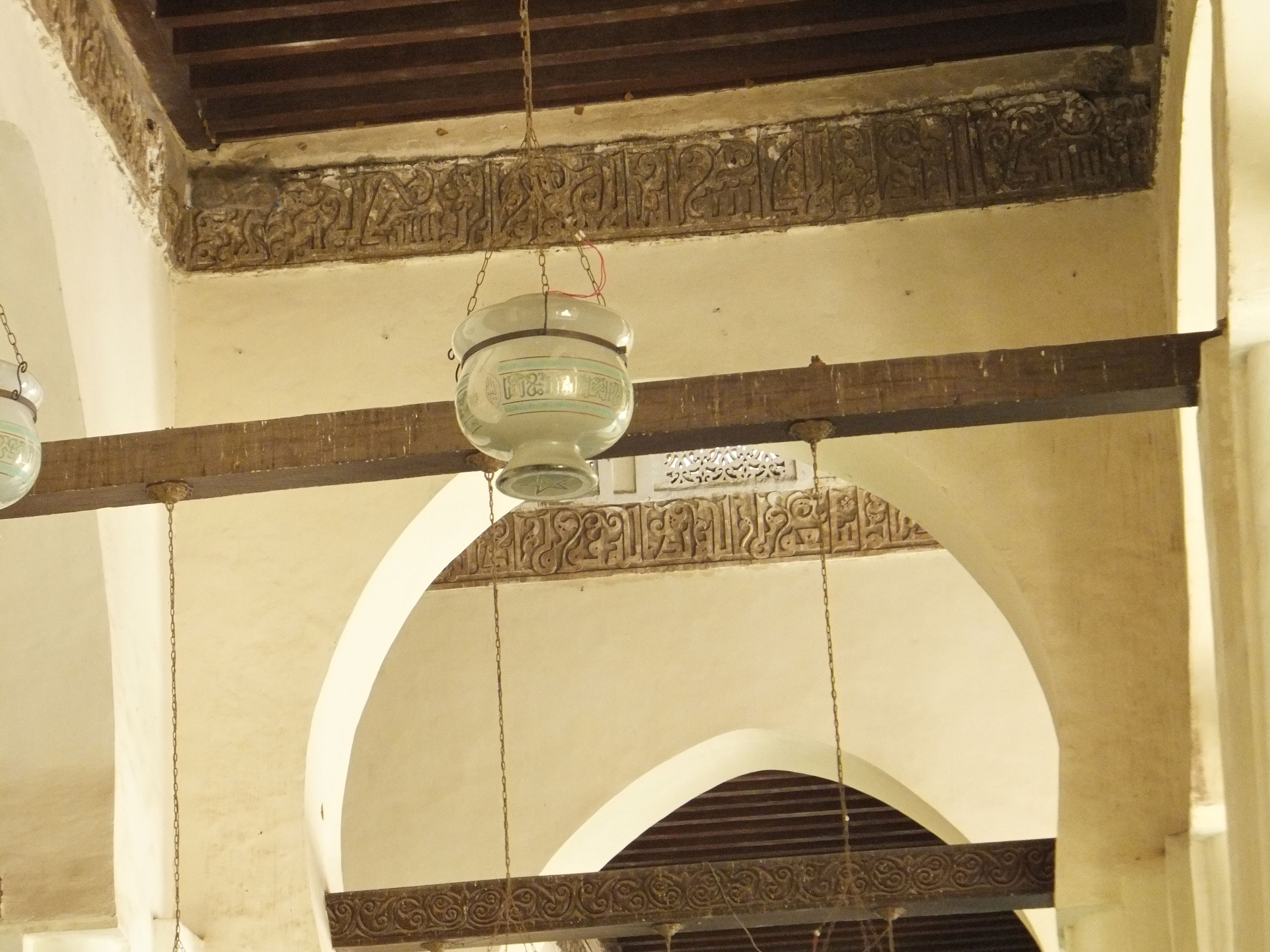
Examples of Kufic inscriptions (top) inside the prayer hall of the mosque

One of the artistic elements of the mosque are Quranic inscriptions done in floriated Kufic script – many of the inscriptions are preserved while many are lost. Of those lost, many have been replaced or restored. Due to various restorations made, the Kufic styles have differed from time to time. The mosque is said to have had twelve thousand feet of Kufic adornment. Kufic inscriptions feature on all four sides of each of the five bays of the prayer hall. The square bases of the three domes and the qibla wall (southeast wall) underneath the windows also carry the Kufic gypsum band of Quranic inscriptions. At the top, colonnades of the arches of the mosque are embellished with a gypsum band of floriated Kufic inscriptions of the Quran which averages approximately 52 cms in width.

== See also ==
- Early medieval domes
- List of mosques in Cairo
- List of mosques in Egypt
- List of Historic Monuments in Cairo
- Shia Islam in Egypt
