= Great Jalayirid Shahnameh =

14th century Jalayirid illustrated manuscript

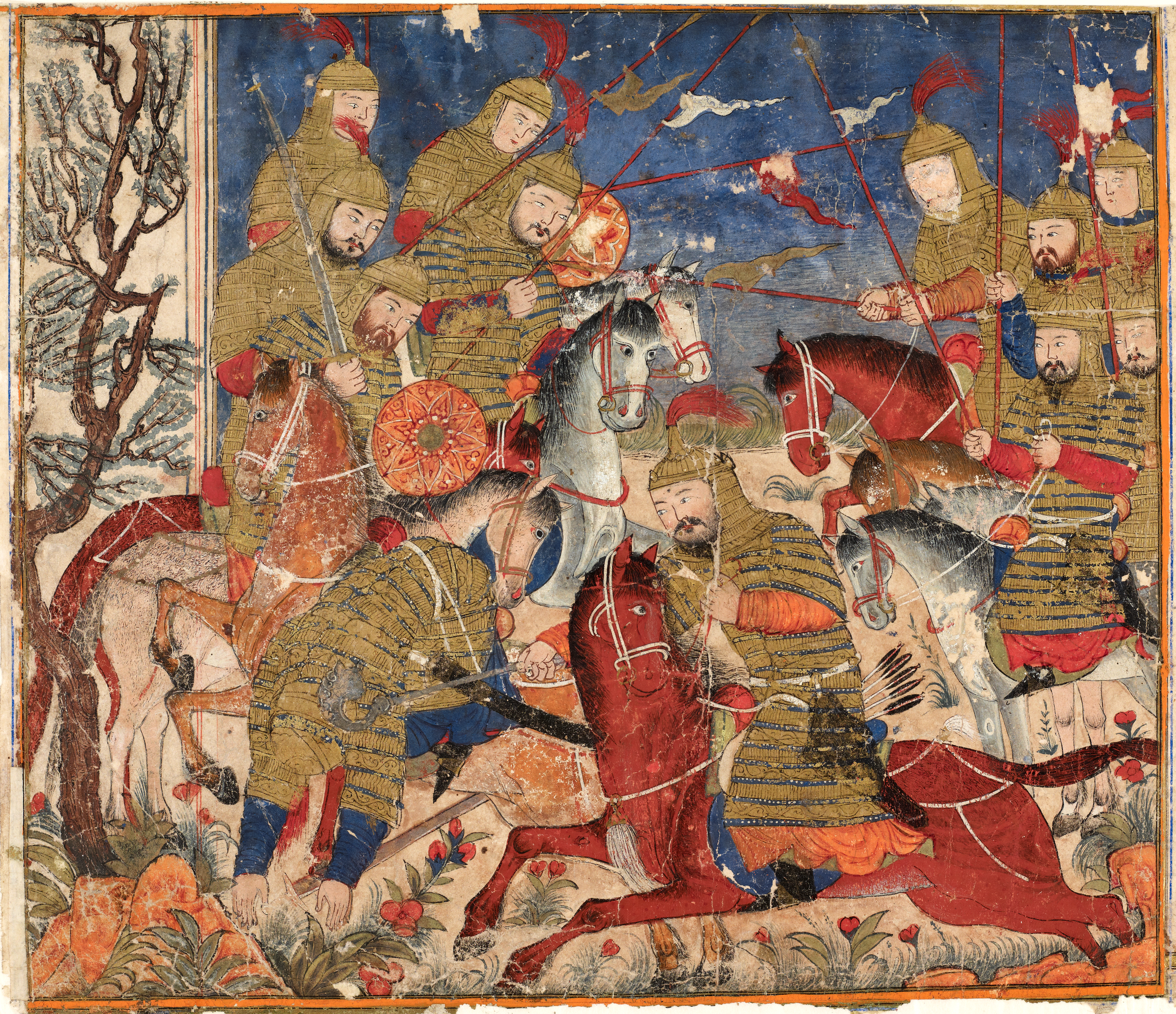
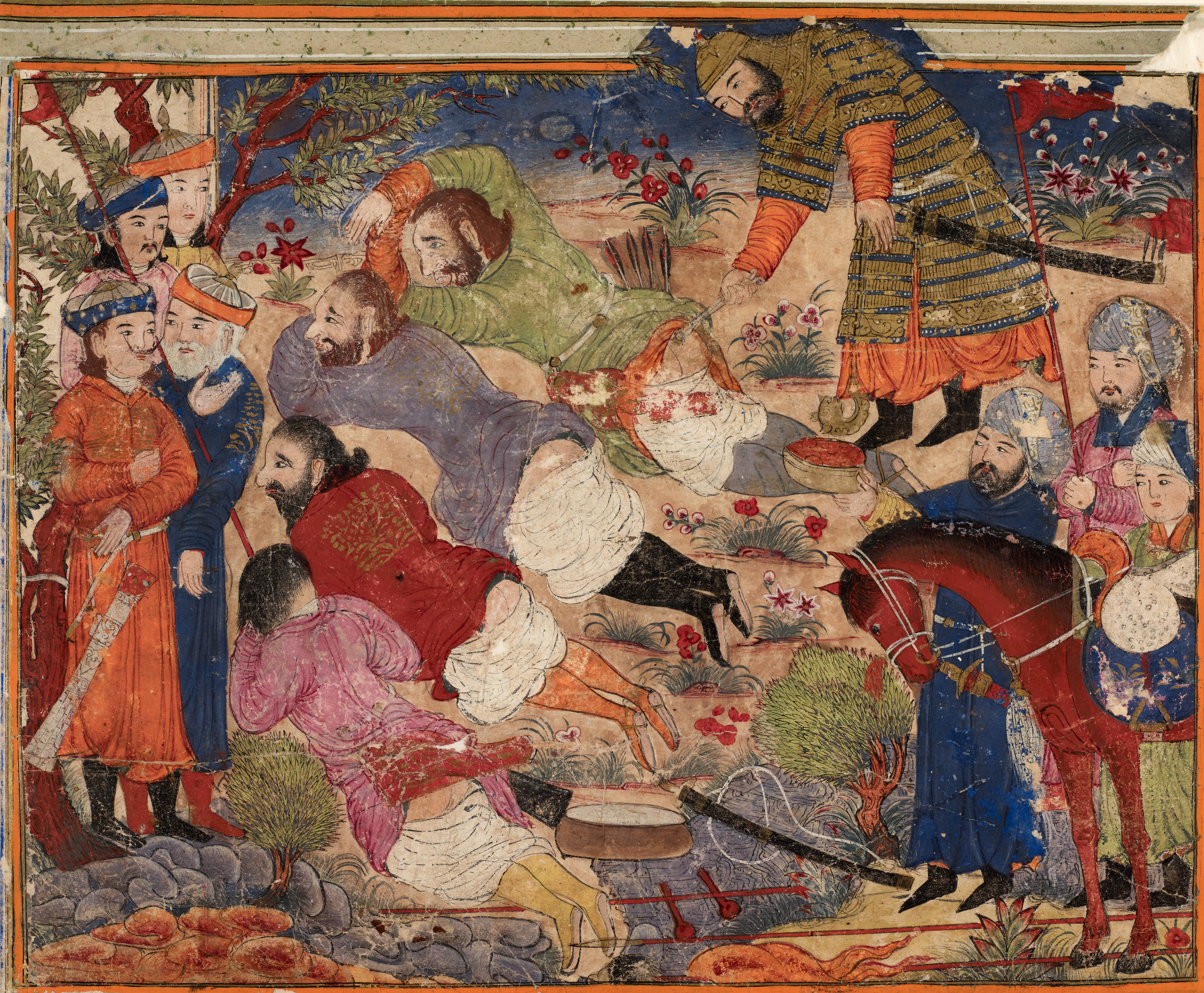
Jalayirid equestrian combat scene and capture of prisoners. Diez Albums, c. 1335–1355. SBB-PK, Diez A.

The Great Jalayirid Shahnameh is a supposed lost illustrated manuscript of Ferdowsi's Shahnameh, the national epic of Greater Iran. It is also known as the Shams al-Din Shahnamah, after its supposed author Shams al-Din. It is thought to have been produced during the mid-14th century, during the reigns of the Jalayirid rulers Hasan Buzurg (1336–1356) and Uways (1356–1374). The manuscript does not exist in its entirety, and its paintings have survived only through their inclusion in albums of sketches and individual paintings currently held in the Topkapı Palace in Istanbul. Through comparison to other Shahnameh manuscripts, including the Great Mongol Shahnameh, Bernard O'Kane has argued for the existence of a unified Jalayirid Shahnameh manuscript, from which several paintings in the Topkapi albums were taken.

== Background ==
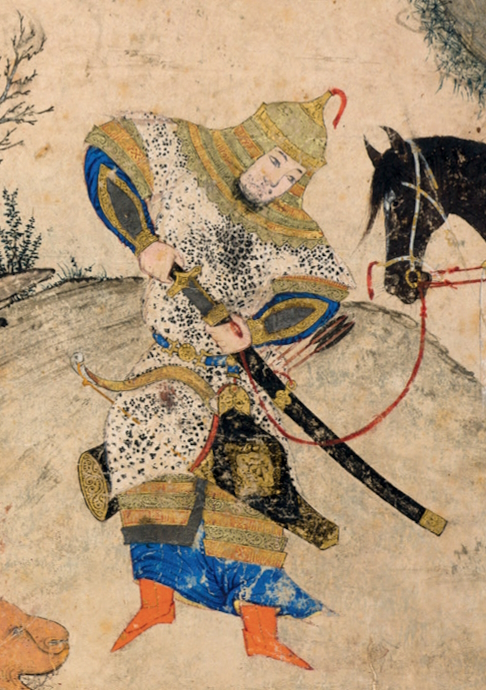
Great Jalayirid Shāhnāma, Tabriz or Baghdad, ca. 1370–74, at the end of the reign of Shaykh Uways Jalayir.

The Jalayirids, a Mongol tribe, gained control of the area around Tabriz c. 1335, and established a dynasty centered in Baghdad in 1340. They ruled from Baghdad until the end of the reign of Sultan Ahmad in 1410, when they became vassals of the Qara Quyunlu and the Timurids.

In the realm of Persian painting, the Jalayirid period is considered a bridge between the Great Mongol Shahnameh and the apex of Persian painting during the Timurid and Safavid periods. During the reign of the Jalayirids, new developments were introduced to Persian art, including taking inspiration from Chinese painting, changes in the depiction of nature, and the usage of margins for additions to paintings. Despite their influence, remarkably few dated manuscripts survive from the Jalayirid period, and efforts to understand the nature and extent of artistic production under the dynasty are ongoing.

The paintings that make up the Great Jalayirid Shahnameh are found in the so-called Istanbul albums, a collection of many compilations of calligraphy, paintings, lithographs, and patterns of diverse origins, including workshops of the major dynasties of Persian painting from the Mongols to the Safavids. The Istanbul albums were compiled in their final form from the 16th to the 19th centuries, although paintings within them had previously been cut and repurposed from other manuscripts.

== Paintings ==
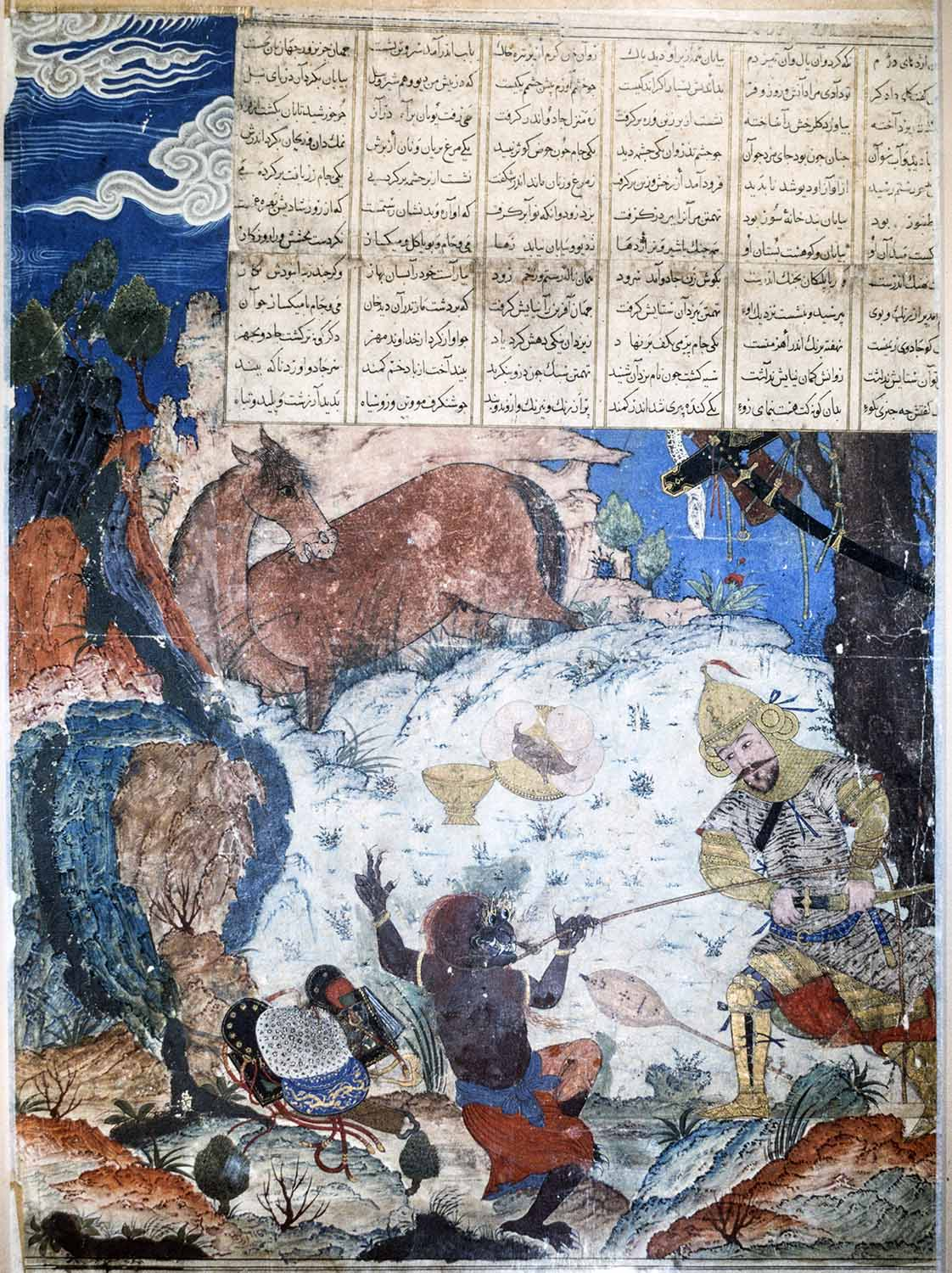
Rustam Lassoing the Witch. Topkapi Saray Library.

O'Kane's study examines in detail three paintings, among others, as having originated in the Great Jalayirid Shahnameh. All three paintings can be found in just one of the Istanbul albums, H.2153. These are: Rustam Lassoing the Witch, which depicts the hero restraining his enemy before killing it; The Watchman Retreats with His Ears in Hand, which depicts a rarely-illustrated scene from the epic involving Rustam's cutting of a watchman's ears; and Zahhak Nailed to Mt Damavand, an illustration of a different tale from the Shahnameh.

Several common characteristics of the paintings underpin the assertion that they share the same source. The style in which rocks are drawn, with small dots serving as shading for the ridges of the rocks, remains consistent. Furthermore, all three contain examples of "rock faces," and have all been significantly altered by the album maker. Rustam and The Watchman have garnered particular attention for their high degree of similarity.

Nurhan Atasoy has characterized eight further paintings, all in H.2153, as being stylistically similar, particularly in their depiction of landscapes and rocks, their framing, and their portrayal of Rustam. In highlighting the similarities between these eleven paintings, Atasoy suggests that they were made by a single artist with “highly-developed technique and skill."

== Legacy ==
The paintings of the Great Jalayirid Shahnameh introduced and represented several stylistic innovations of the Jalayirid era. Its paintings are some of the earliest dateable examples of paintings that transcend their frames and use the margin, a theme that was gradually developed in later manuscripts such as the Diwan of Sultan Ahmad.

The paintings are also defined by a verticality not seen in prior Ilkhanid manuscripts. This new perspective was characterized by a greater sense of space and allowed for larger, more detailed paintings. These two formatting innovations contributed to the Jalayirid trend, identified by Sheila Blair, of “the gradual expansion of the painting at the expense of the text over the course of the fourteenth and early fifteenth centuries.” As such, in Rustam Lassoing the Witch, less than a third of the page is taken up by text, and on its left side, the painting extends to the full height of the page.

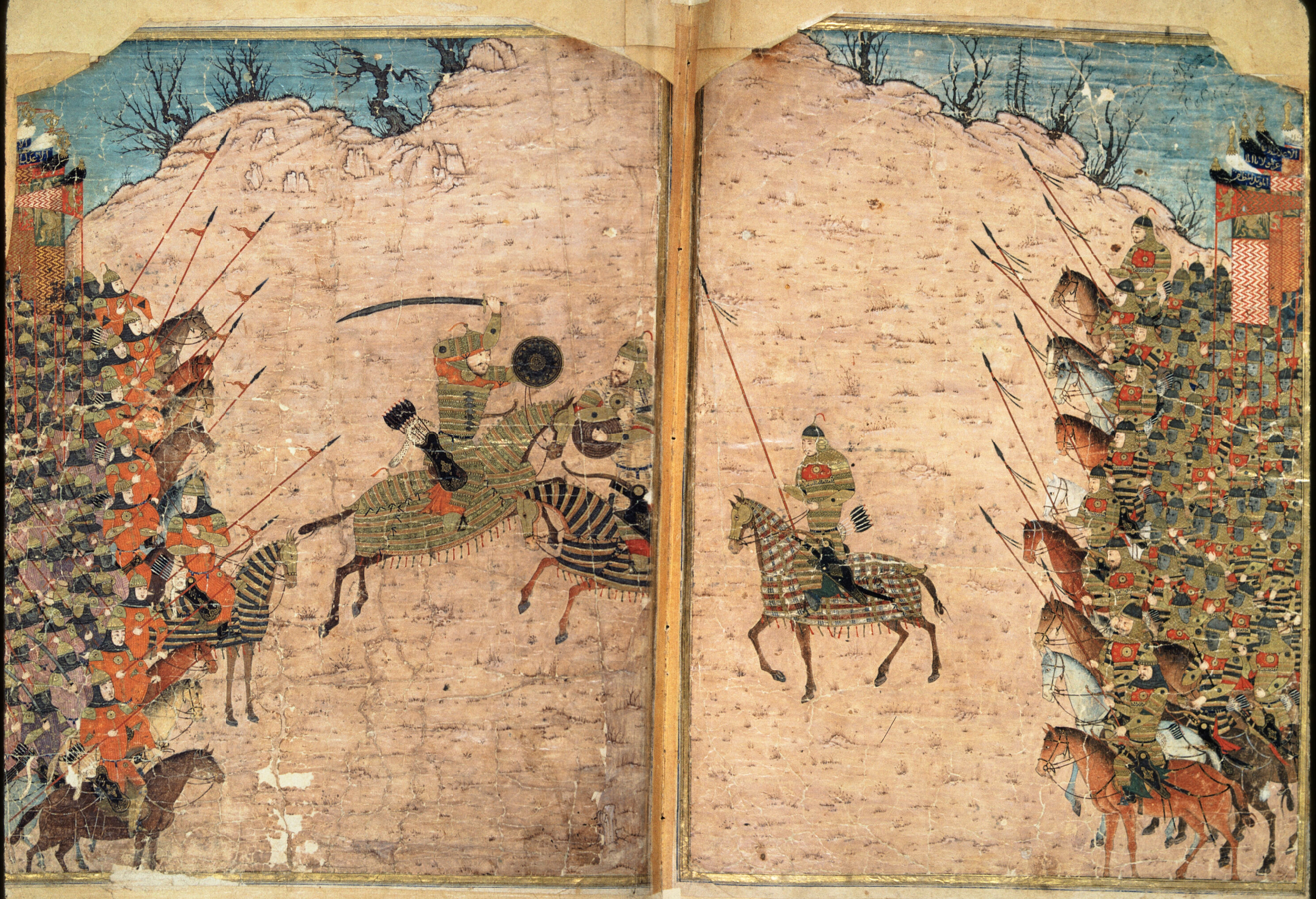
Battle between the Iranians and the Turanians, Shahnama Fatih Album (TSM H. 2153, ff. 52b-53a)

This manuscript is known for its “rock faces,” small animal or human figures hidden within the natural contours of the landscape. Rustam Lassoing the Witch, for example, contains the figure of a fox within the rocks on the bottom left. This was among several Persian innovations inspired by Chinese painting, along with the swirled, lightning-like depiction of clouds, which are visible to the left of the text in Rustam. The Great Jalayirid Shahnameh may be the earliest known manuscript to incorporate this feature as the earliest definitively dated manuscript with rock faces is another Shahnameh from 1370, around the time that the Great Jalayirid Shahnameh was completed.

The manuscript epitomizes, but does not introduce, several other hallmarks of Jalayirid painting. These include the shaded, dotted hills and rocks and the inclusion of hair on the muzzles of horses (another Chinese-inspired convention). Both traits are visible in Rustam Lassoing the Witch.

Due to these innovations, the Great Jalayirid Shahnameh, along with other works of the Jalayirid era, was a primary inspiration for later Persian artists, and have thus been called a “source” of modern Persian painting. Bernard O’Kane has further argued that, due to its depth of imagery, texture, and placement of figures, the Great Jalayirid Shahnameh was a pinnacle of Persian painting, matching the masterpieces of the Timurid and Safavid eras.

=== Influences ===
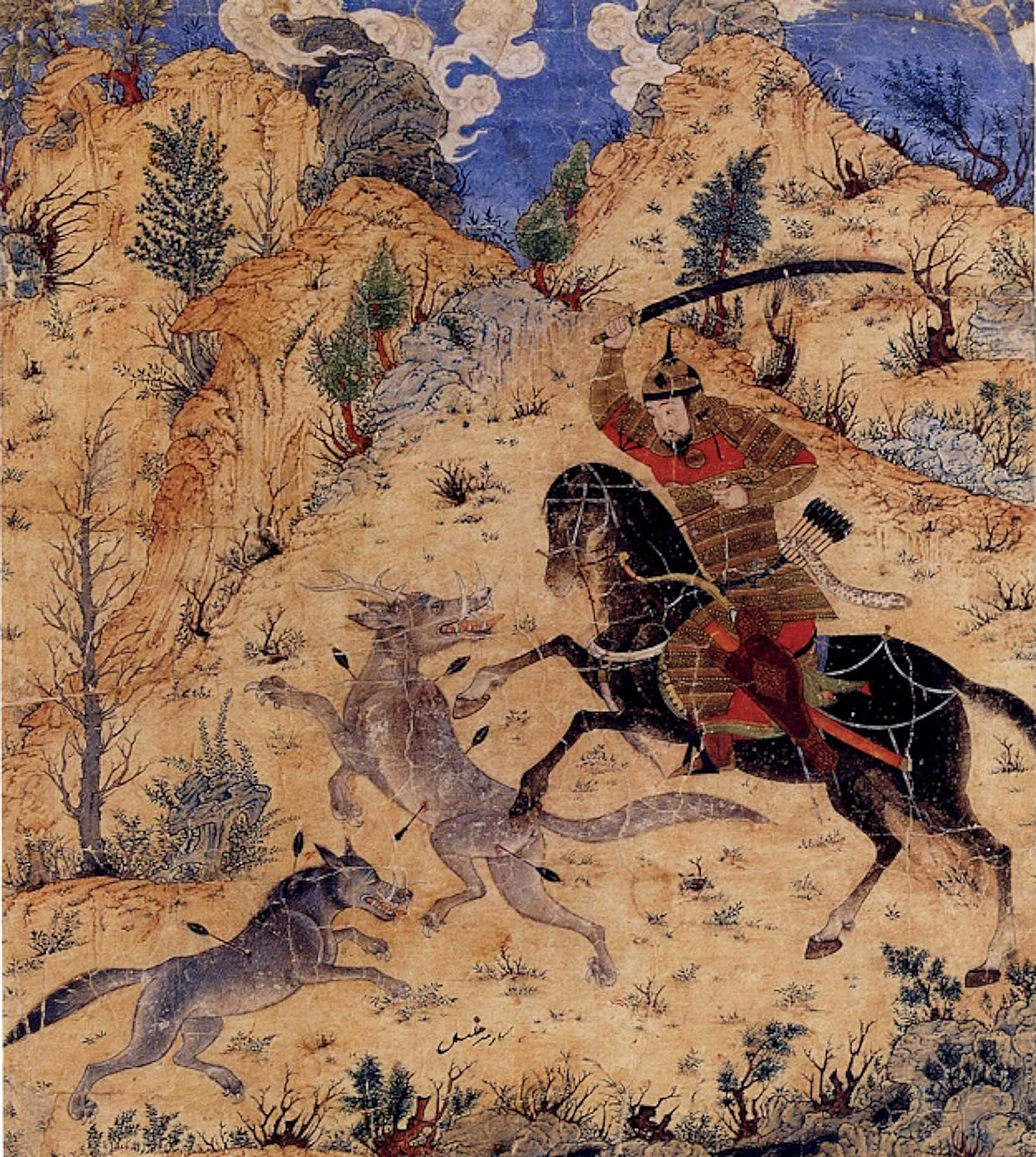
Jalayirid Shāhnāmah (c.1385)

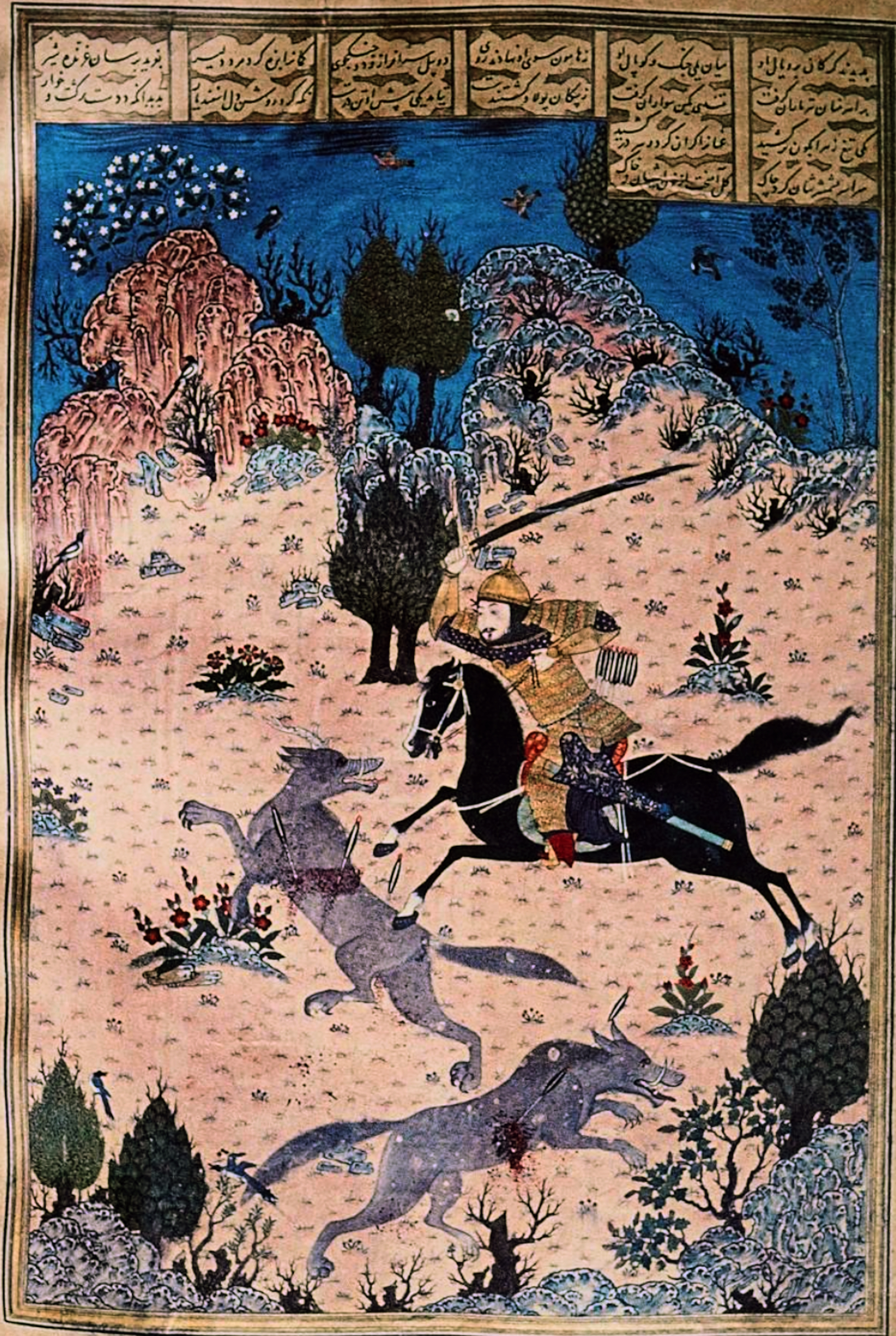
Baysunghur Shahnameh (c.1430)

Isfandiyar's first Khwan, he slays the wolf-monster. The scene from the Baysunghur Shahnameh (right) was exactly derived from the Jalayirid Shāhnāmah (left).

The Baysunghur Shahnameh seems to have been greatly influenced by the Great Jalayirid Shahnama, which has also been described as the "Shams al-Din Shahnama" after its supposed author Shams ad-Din, or even called the "Proto-Baysunghur Shahnamah". The Great Jalayirid Shahnama was reused, referenced and copied by the Timurid ruler Baysunghur, as reported by Dust Muhammad.

Some scenes from the Baysunghur Shahnameh, such as Isfandiyar's first Khwan, he slays the wolf-monster, are obvious copies and adaptations of corresponding scenes in the Jalayirid Shāhnāmah.

== Bibliography ==
- O'Kane, Bernard (2017). "The Great Jalayirid Shahnāmā". In Gonnella, Julia; Weis, Friederike; Rauch, Christoph (eds.). The Diez Albums: Context and Content. Leiden: Brill. pp. 469–484. ISBN 978-90-04-32348-3
- Çağman, Filiz; Tanindi, Zeren (2011). "Selections from Jalayirid Books in the Libraries of Istanbul". Muqarnas. 28 (1): 221–264 JSTOR 23350289
- Wing, Patrick (2016). "Conclusion and the Legacy of the Jalayirids". The Jalayirids: State Dynastic Formation in the Mongol Middle East. Edinburgh: Edinburgh University Press. pp. 185–201. ISBN 978-1-4744-0225-5
- Atasoy, Nurhan (1970). "Four Istanbul Albums and Some Fragments from Fourteenth-Century Shah-Namehs". Ars Orientalis. 8 (1): 19–48 JSTOR 4629251
- Klimburg-Salter, Deborah (1976–1977). "A Sufi Theme in Persian Painting: The Diwan of Sultan Ahmad Gala'ir in the Free Gallery of Art, Washington D.C." Kunst Des Orients. 11 (1/2): 43–84 JSTOR 4629251
- Blair, Sheila S. (2019). "A Romantic Interlude: The Wedding Celebrations from a Manuscript with Three Poems by Khvaju Kirmani". Text and Image in Medieval Persian Art. Edinburgh: Edinburgh University Press. pp. 172–227. doi:10.3366/j.ctvxcrp75.10
- O'Kane, Bernard (2021). "Rock Faces and Rock Figures in Persian Painting". Studies in Islamic Painting, Epigraphy, and Decorative Arts. Edinburgh: Edinburgh University Press. pp. 435–479. doi:10.3366/j.ctv27zdjv6.23 ISBN 978-1-4744-7476-4
- O'Kane, Bernard (2021). "Siyah Qalam: The Jalayirid Connections". Studies in Islamic Painting, Epigraphy, and Decorative Arts. Edinburgh: Edinburgh University Press. pp. 357–392. doi:10.3366/j.ctv27zdjv6.20 ISBN 978-1-4744-7476-4
- Sims, Eleanor; Marshak, Boris Ilʹich; Grube, Ernst J. (1 January 2002). Peerless Images: Persian Painting and Its Sources. Yale University Press. p. 156. ISBN 978-0-300-09038-3.
