= Baysunghur Shahnameh =

Illuminated Shahnameh manuscript from 1430

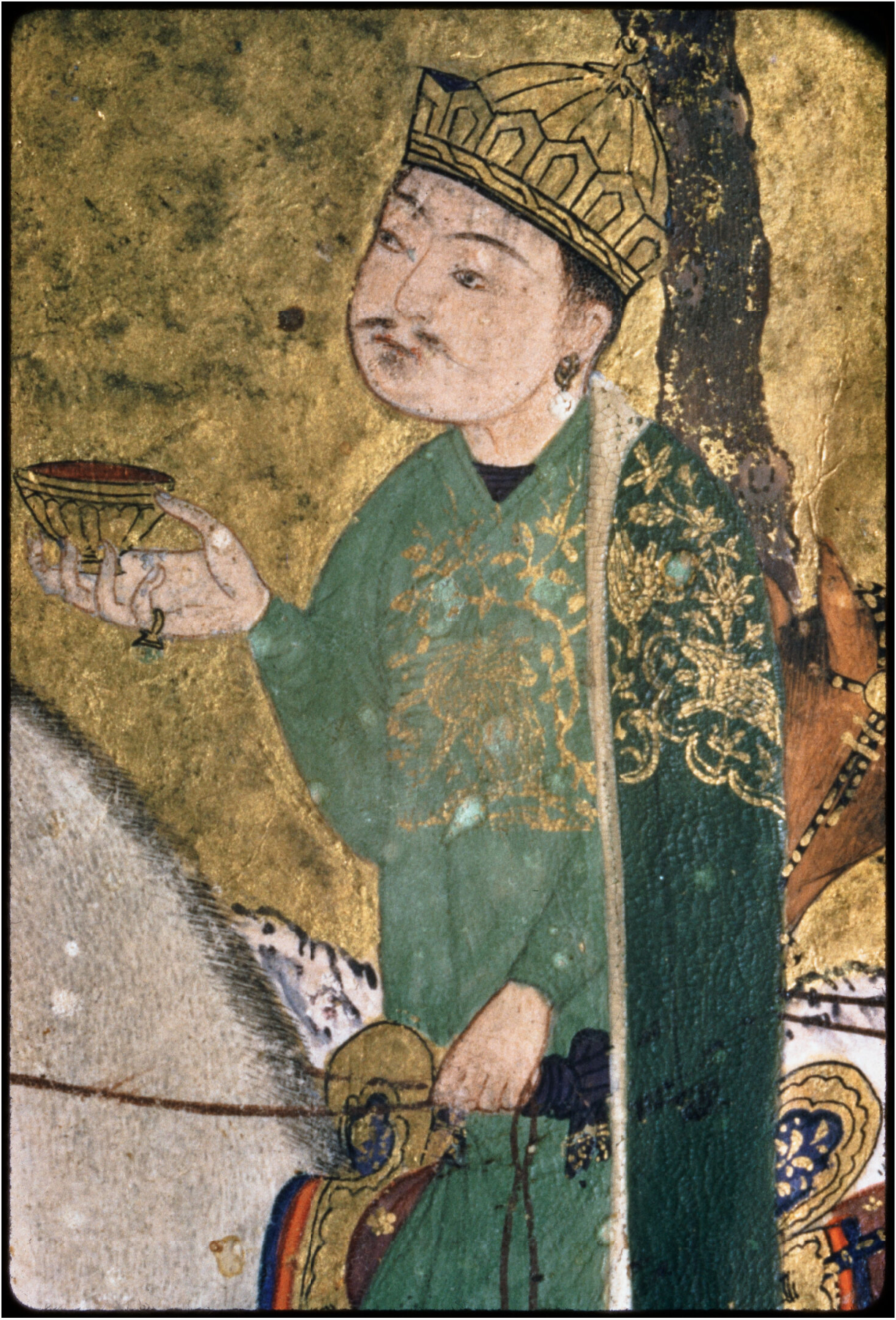
Baysunghur attending a hunt (detail). Frontispiece of the Baysunghur Shahnameh (Gulistan Museum Ms 716), 1430.

The Baysunghur Shahnameh (Persian: شاهنامه بایسنقری) is an illustrated manuscript of the Shahnameh, the national epic of Greater Iran. The work on this manuscript was started in 1426 at the order of Baysunghur Mirza, the Timurid prince, and was completed on 5 Jumada 833, (January 31, 1430). It is now in the museum of The Golestan Palace, in Tehran, Iran, and regarded as a key masterpiece of the Persian miniature.

According to the preface, apparently written by Baysunghur himself for this volume, and usually copied in later manuscripts, it was not a copy of a previous manuscript, but instead it was prepared by comparing several older manuscripts. The purpose of this comparison was not to achieve greater fidelity to Ferdowsi's original Shahnameh; rather, it was to modernize the language of the text and to add verses to it. Because of this, the Baysunghur Shahnameh is one of the most voluminous manuscripts of Shahnameh, consisting of some 58,000 verses (today's version of Shahnameh consists of about 50,000 verses). The value of this manuscript is not because of its text, but in its artistry. Written in Nastaʿlīq script by Jafar Tabrizi, it has 31 lines per page, 346 folios, and 21 manuscript paintings in the Herat School style and is one of the most important works to be identified with this school. The script is set in 6 columns, which is a nod to tradition. The script of contemporaneous Shahnamehs in the "modern" style were set in 4 columns. Earlier Shahnamehs have had cramped spreads with fewer pages and more illustrations. The Baysunghur atelier also produced a Shahnameh without any illustrations before this one. With the production of this earlier Shahnameh and the Baysunghur Shahnameh, new horizons were being explored in book design during the Timurid period. Beside the so-called Demotte Shahnameh and the Shahnameh of Shah Tahmasp, the Baysunghur Shahnameh is one of the most important and famous manuscripts of the Shahnameh. It was shown in London in 1931, and at the exhibition Masterpieces of Persian Painting at the Museum of Tehran in 2005.

It is included in UNESCO's Memory of the World international register of globally-important cultural heritage.

== Miniatures ==
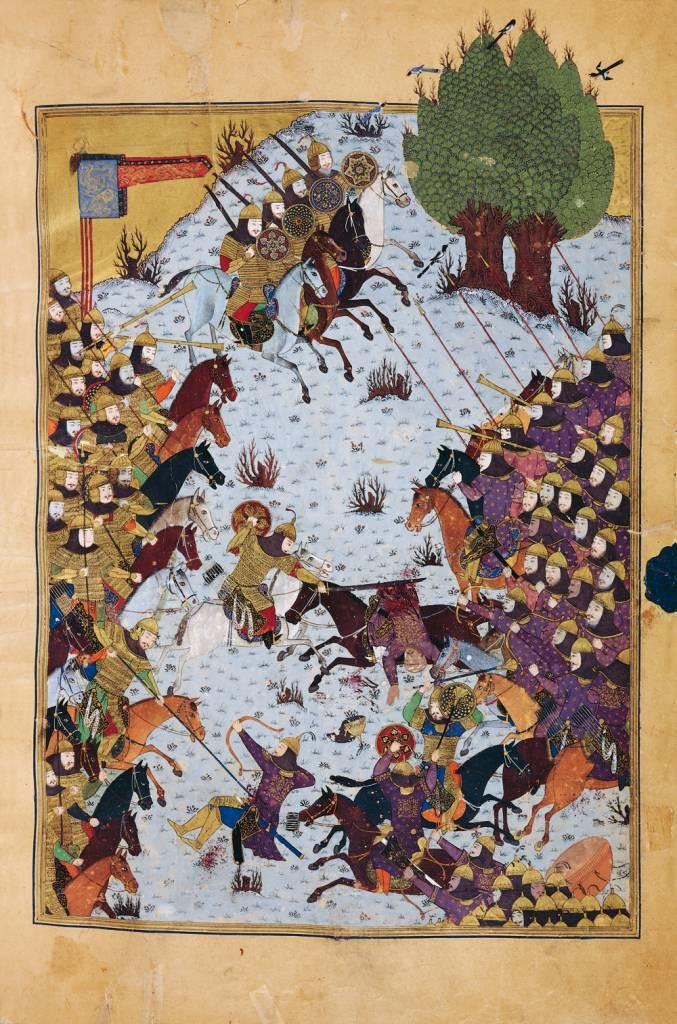
A battle scene from the Baysonghori Shahnameh, the battle of Kai Khosrow and Afrasiab

The manuscript paintings commonly known as "miniatures" found in the Baysunghur Shahnameh were well executed with bright colors and crisp lines that were revolutionary for the time. There are 20 illustrations plus one double image for the frontispiece, unlike other versions which could have over 100 images. The illustration is supposed to correspond to the accompanying text. However, since there are so few illustrations, their inclusion gives the impression that their respective corresponding passages are of relatively more importance. It is likely that Baysunghur chose the 21 subjects for the miniatures himself. Several of these are unusual choices for illustrations, and several have to do with the subject of a prince impatient to inherit (who never does). The frontispiece shows the portrait of a prince, who is probably Baysunghur. There are other possible portraits of the prince throughout the miniatures, but all show events that occurred before his rule and birth. The illustrations follow the tradition of the Shahnameh in most senses. There are 6 enthronement scenes, and 9 battle or killing scenes. All Shahnamehs have these motifs and without them it would not truly qualify as a book of kings. Some of the miniatures show new ideas that had not been shown in earlier Shahnameh versions. These include Luhrasp enthroned, combat between Rustam and Barzu, Rustam and Isfandiyar shaking hands, Gulnar falling in love with Ardashir, and Yazdagird giving Bahram Gur to Mundhir the Arab. Although these scenes are new, their iconography and style are not since they pull from traditional motifs. At about 38 x 26 cm, the page size was unusually large for the period, and several miniatures fill the whole page, with the frontispiece across two pages. In both of these design aspects, this manuscript shows the direction later royal commissions would take.

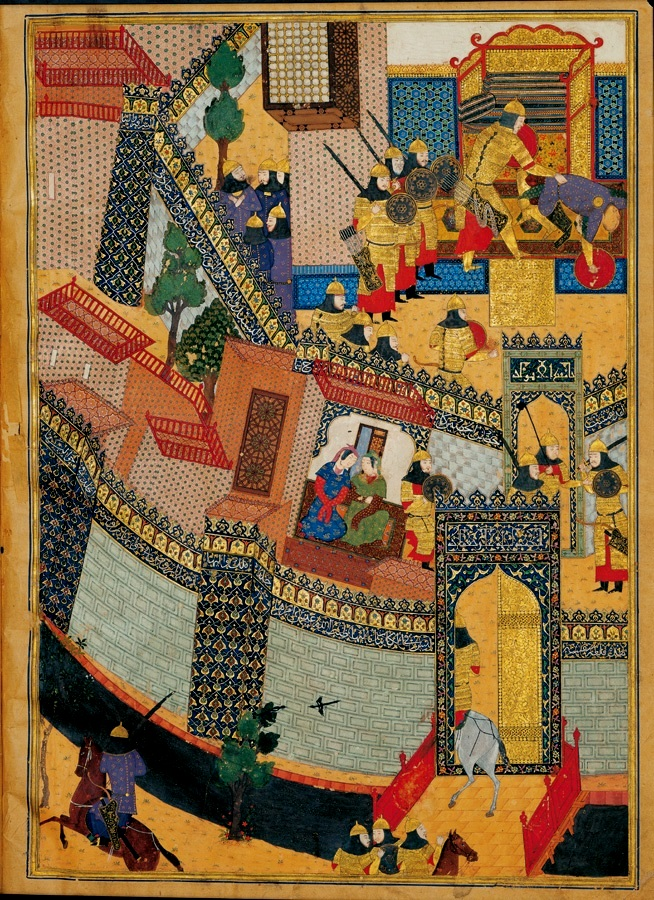
Isfandiyar kills Arjasp to rescue his sisters

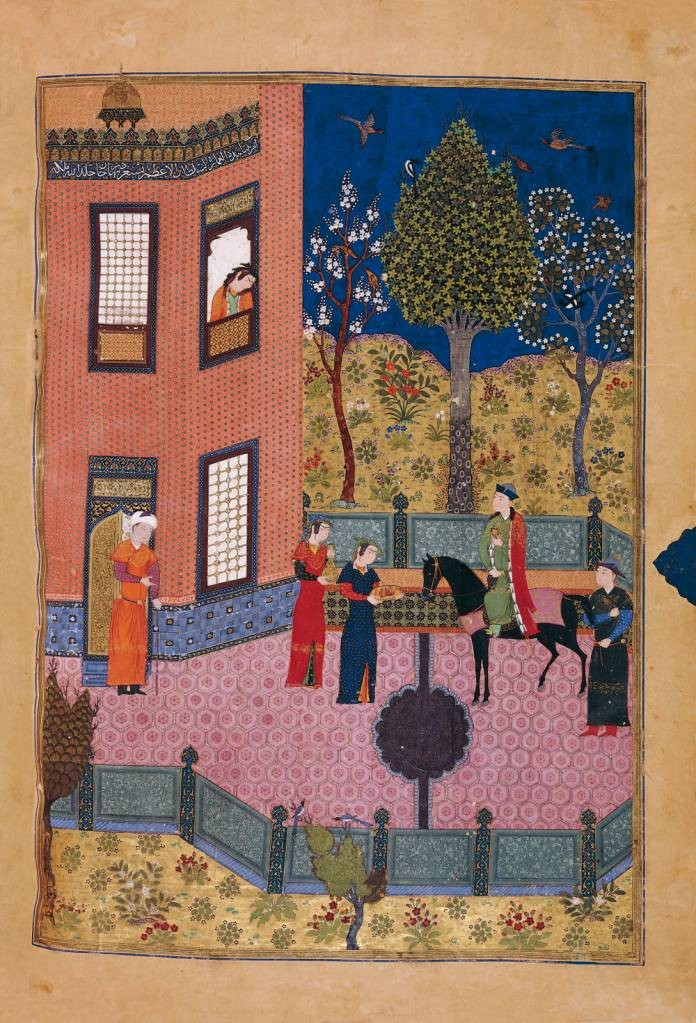
The meeting of Ardashir with Golnar

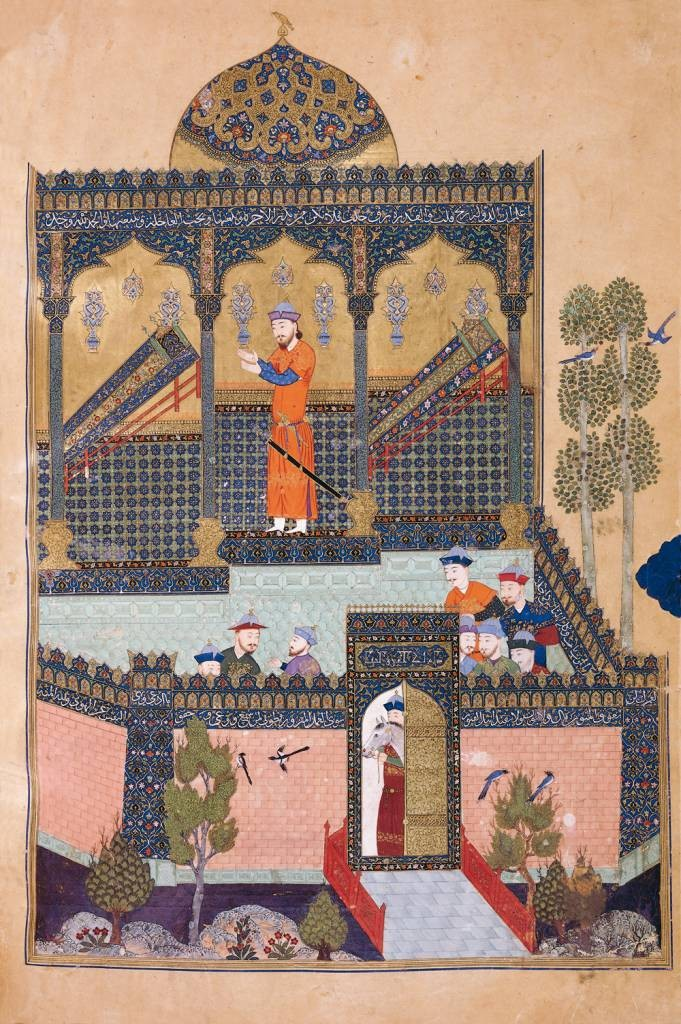
Faramarz son of Rostam mourns the death of his father and of his uncle Zavareh

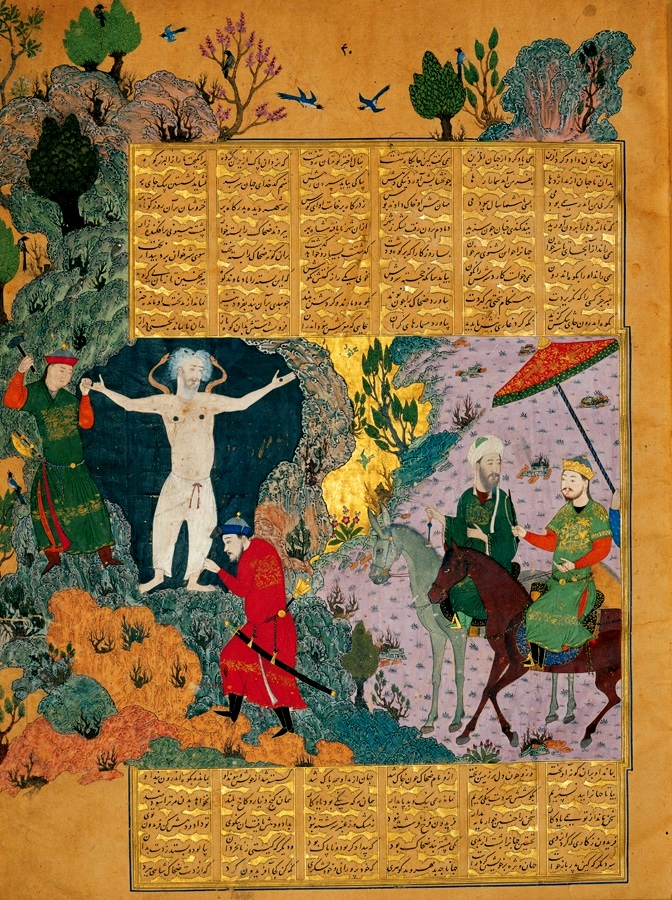
Zahhak bound on mount Damavand

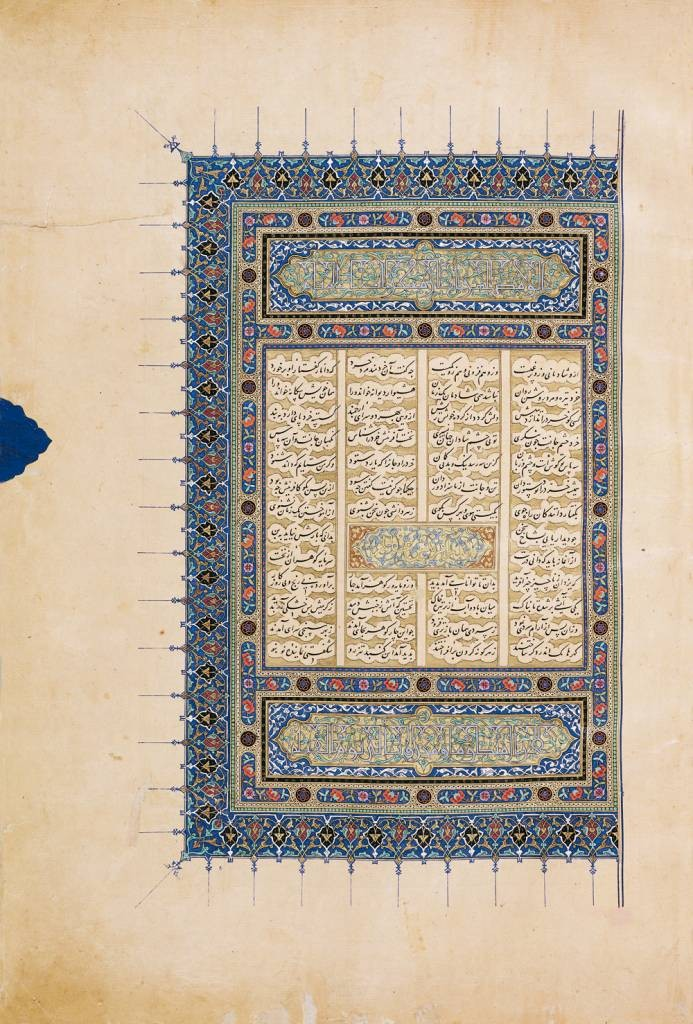
Baysunghur Shahnameh text

== Influences ==
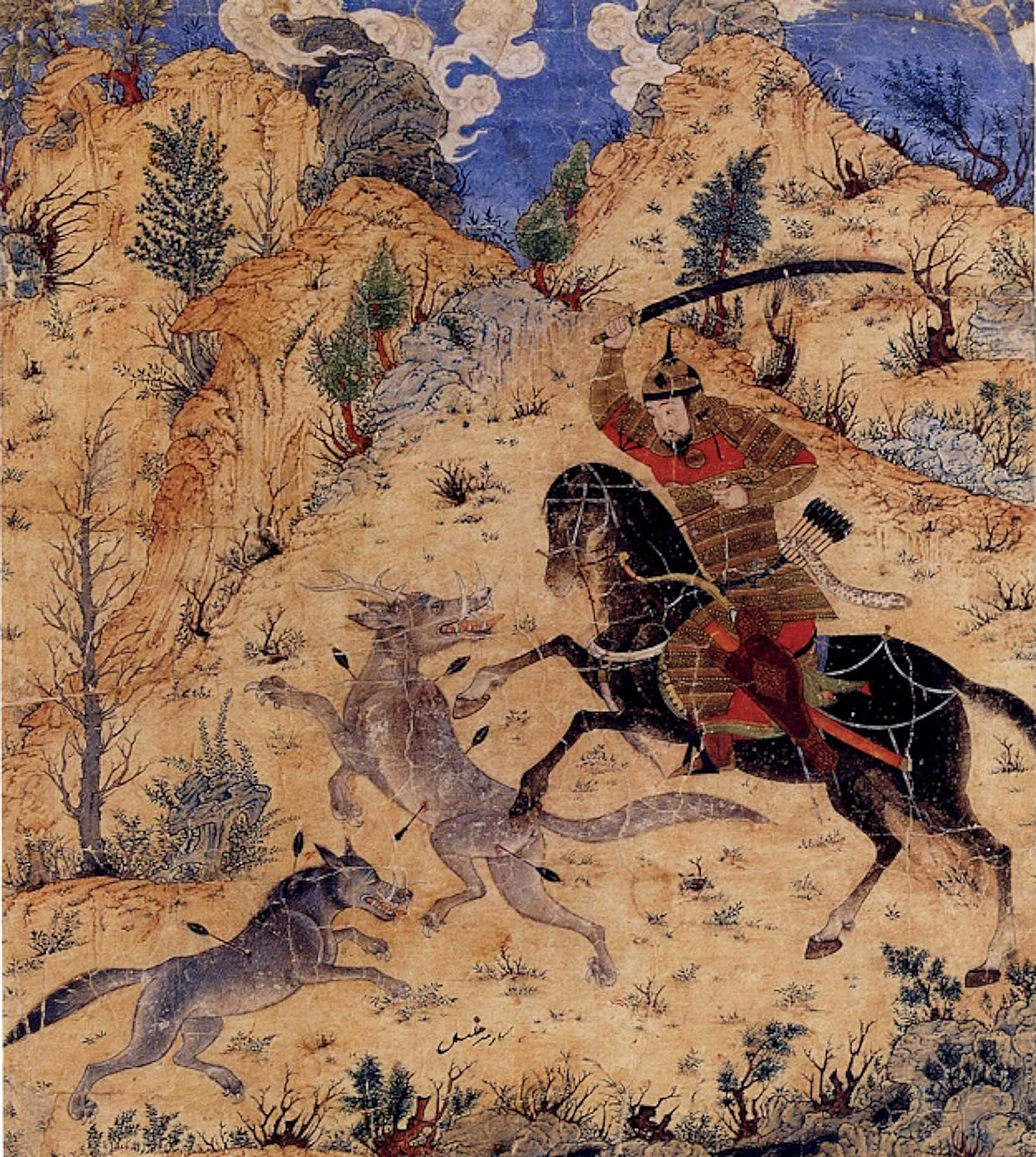
Jalayirid Shāhnāmah (c.1385)

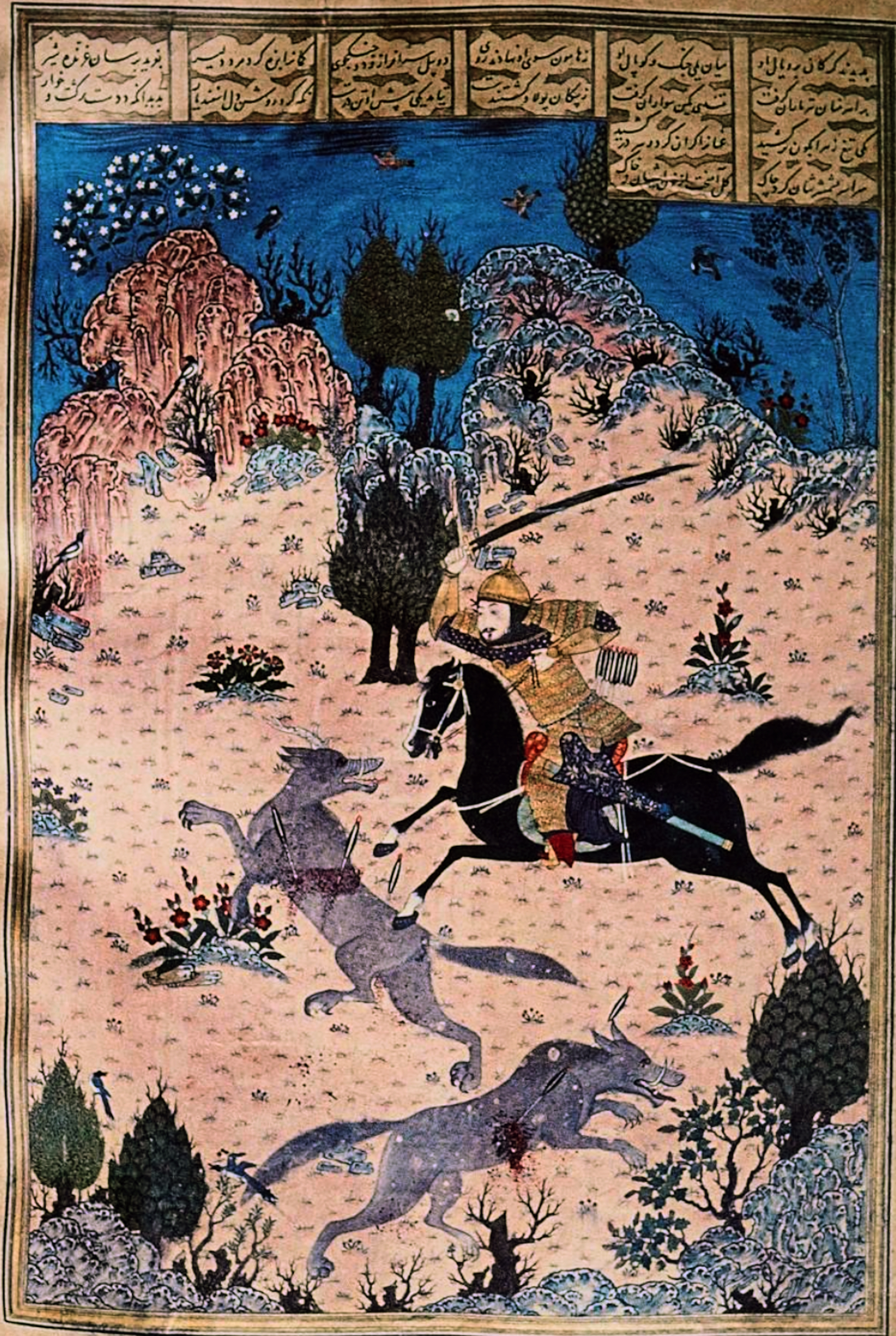
Baysunghur Shahnameh (c.1430)

Isfandiyar's first Khwan, he slays the wolf-monster. The scene from the Baysunghur Shahnameh (right) was exactly derived from the Jalayirid Shāhnāmah (left).

The Baysunghur Shahnameh seems to have been greatly influenced by the Great Jalayirid Shahnama, which has also been described as the "Shams al-Din Shahnama" after its supposed author Shams ad-Din, or even called the "Proto-Baysunghur Shahnamah". The Great Jalayirid Shahnama was reused, referenced and copied by the Timurid ruler Baysunghur, as reported by Dust Muhammad.

== See also ==
- Memory of the World Register – Asia and the Pacific
- List of Memory of the World Register in Iran
