= Shamsuddin (painter) =

Persian miniaturist painter (14th century)

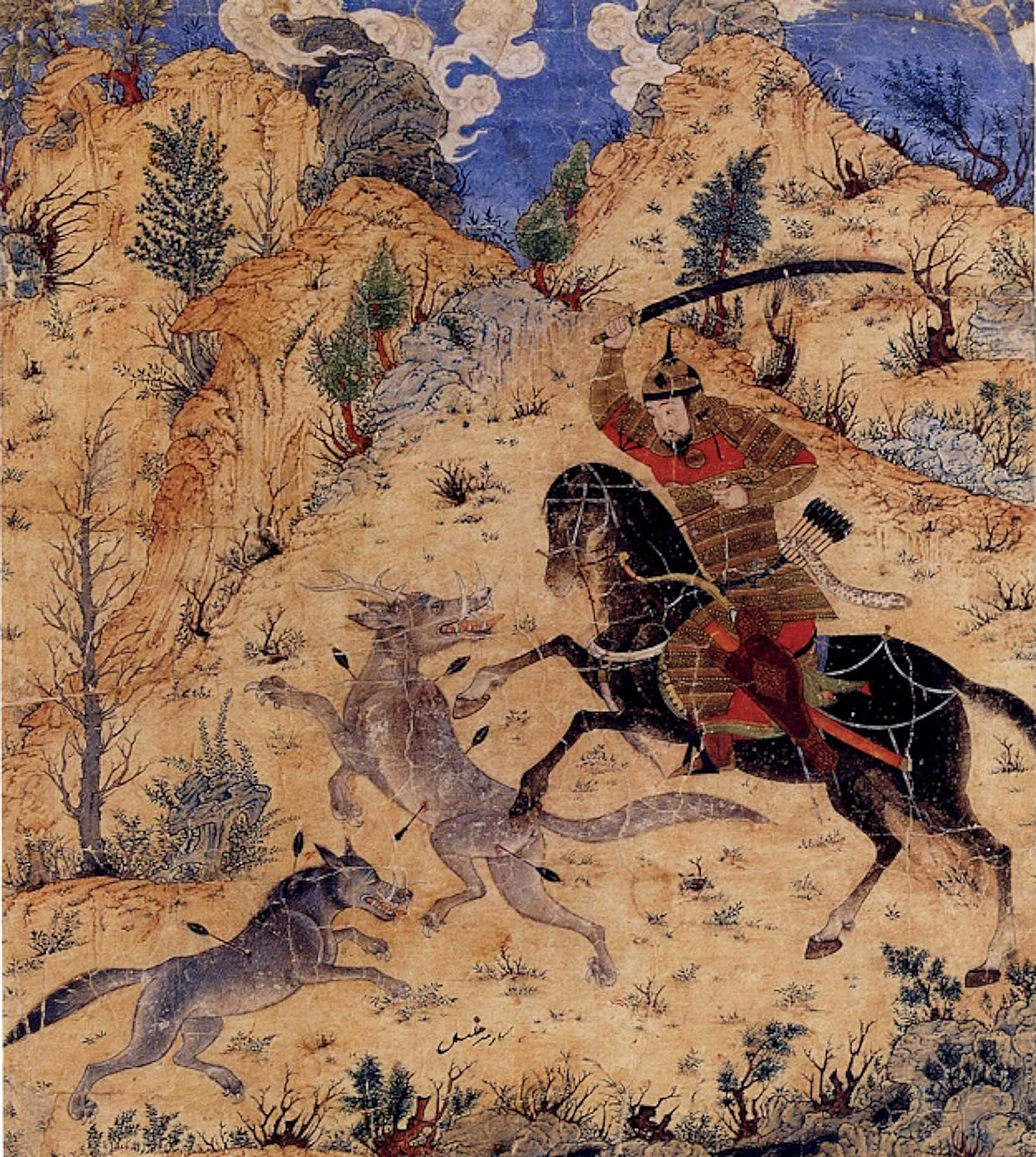
Isfandiar fighting the wolves, Jalayirid Shāhnāmah, a possible work of Shamsuddin. Probably one of the paintings mentioned by Dust Muhammad as made by Shams al-Din in "square format in a Shahnama". Painted before 1374.

Shams ad-Din, also Shamsuddin (Persian: شمس‌الدین; active until 1374), was a Persian miniaturist from the mid-14th century. He may have been the main artist of the Great Jalayirid Shahnameh.

The art historian, calligrapher, and Persian miniaturist Dust Muhammad, Bahram Mirza Safavi's librarian, who wrote in the mid-16th century a “Treatise on Calligraphy and Painters” states that Shams ad-Din was a disciple of the master miniaturist Ahmad Musa, who was active in Baghdad. Shams ad-Din lived during the reign of Sultan Uvais I of the Jalayirid dynasty, in whose service he worked. However, after the sultan’s death in 1374, he was unable to find another patron and began to devote himself to pleasures at home.

One of his students was Abd al-Hay, who later became one of the leading artists in the Baghdad library of Sultan Ahmad Jalayir. Abd al-Hay provided financial support to his elderly master, who in return passed on all his knowledge to him.

Amir Dawlatyar, a slave of Sultan Abu-Sa'id, was ennobled by being a pupil of Master Ahmad Musa and was outstanding in this regard, especially in pen-and-ink drawing, such that, although Mawlana Waliullah was without equal in the world, when he saw Amir Dawlatyar' s work he justly confessed his inability [to match it].
One of his students was Master Shamsuddin, who was trained in the time of Sultan Uways and made scenes in a square-format Shahnama that was written by Khwaja Amir-Ali. When Sultan Uways went to his eternal reward, Master Shamsuddin chose not to enter anyone else's service; and his student, Khwaja AbdulHayy, undertook [to provide] him with the necessities of life, and the aforementioned master lived in AbdulHayy's house, constantly enjoying leisure, and devoted himself to training Khwaja Abdul-Hayy so that the Khwaja, in the time of the emperor Sultan-Ahmad of Baghdad, whose countenance shone in patronizing the masters of learning and perfection, took up the pen of uniqueness and instructed Sultan Ahmad in depiction so that the sultan himself produced a scene in the Abusa 'idnama in pen and ink. ... Another of Shamsuddin's students was Master Junayd of Baghdad.

— Preface to the Bahram Mirza Album (extract), by Dust Muhammad.

Dust Muhammad, also mentions another highly talented disciple of Shams ad-Din, Junayd, whose brush was considered the most lyrical among his pupils. No miniature signed by Shams ad-Din has survived. Dust Muhammad notes that the manuscript of the Shahnameh ("Book of Kings") on which Shams ad-Din worked was square in format. Unfortunately, this manuscript has not survived.

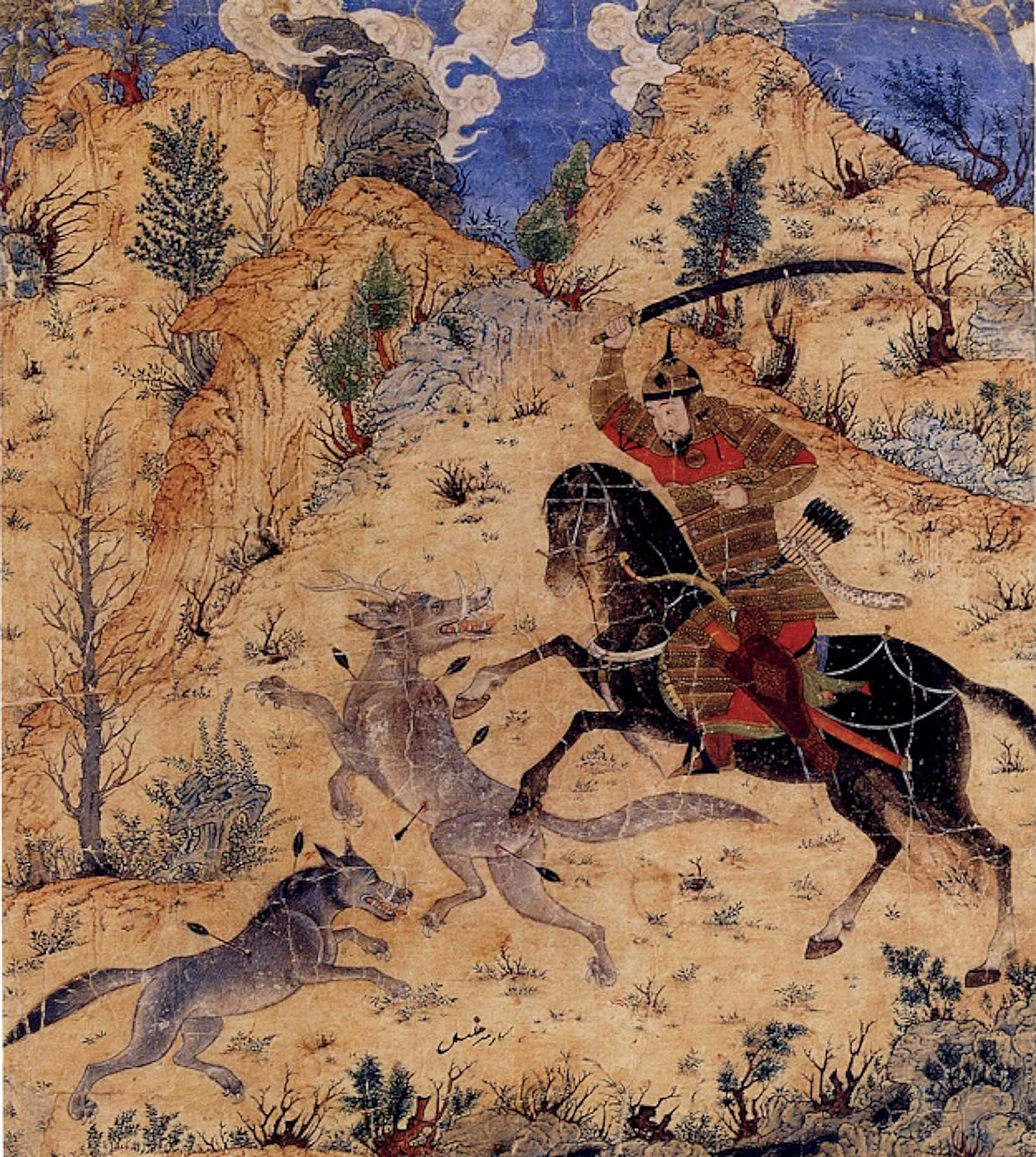
Jalayirid Shāhnāmah (c.1385)

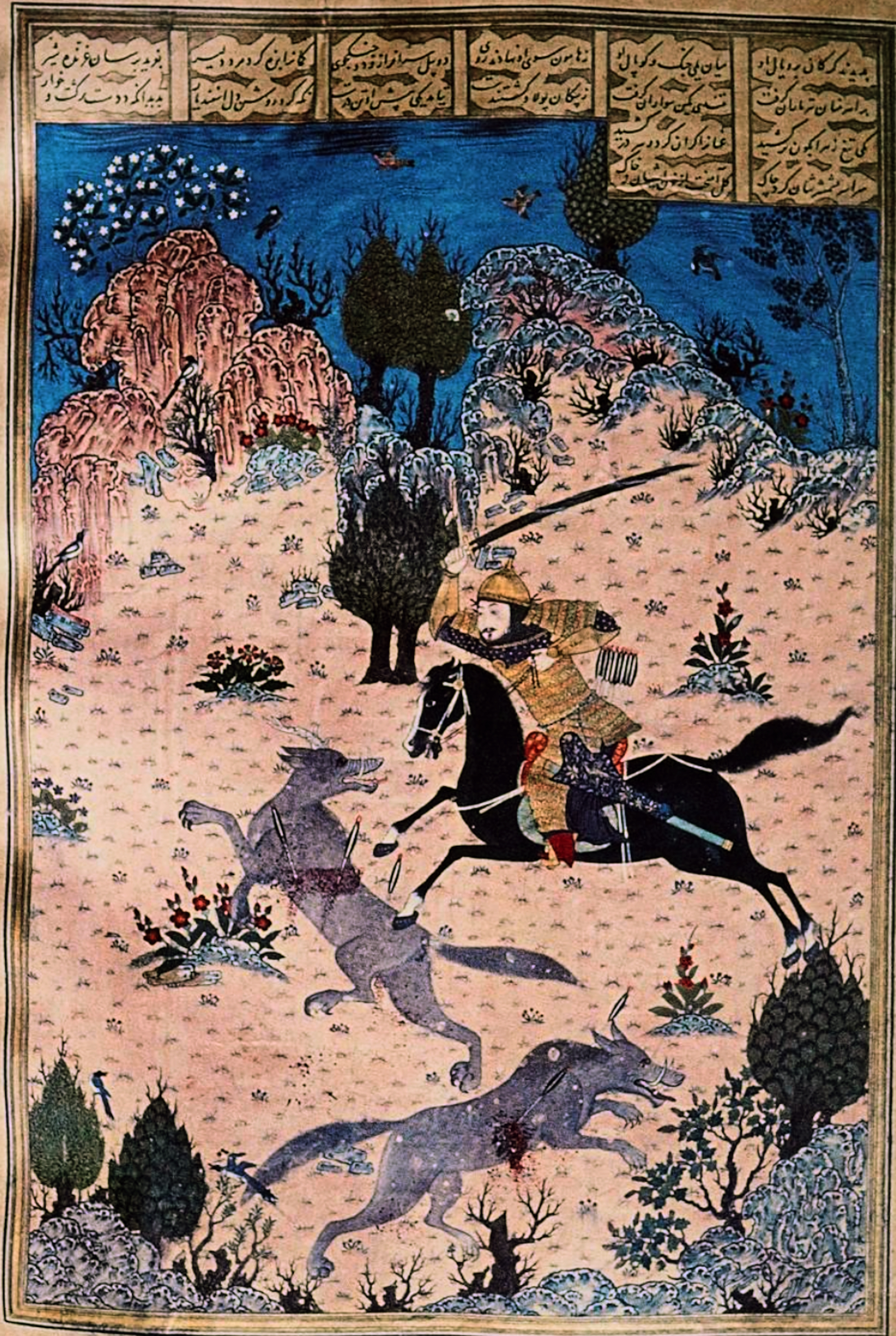
Baysunghur Shahnameh (c.1430)

Isfandiyar's first Khwan, he slays the wolf-monster. The scene from the Baysunghur Shahnameh (right) was exactly derived from the Jalayirid Shāhnāmah (left).

Some art historians believe that the miniature titled “Iskander (Alexander the Great) Fighting the Wolves,” from folios of the Book of Kings preserved in the Topkapi Museum in Istanbul, was painted by Shams ad-Din, although this attribution is not unanimously accepted. It was likely part of the Great Jalayirid Shahnama, which has also been described as the "Shams al-Din Shahnama". This Shahnamah was highly influential, and was reused, referenced and copied by the Timurid Baysunghur. It is sometimes called the "Proto-Baysunghur" Shahnama.

== Sources ==
- Grey, Basil (1961). Persian Painting. Skira.
- Sims, Eleanor; Marshak, Boris Ilʹich; Grube, Ernst J. (1 January 2002). Peerless Images: Persian Painting and Its Sources. Yale University Press. p. 156. ISBN 978-0-300-09038-3.
