= Doris Behrens-Abouseif =

Historian of Islamic arts and culture

Doris Behrens-Abouseif (born 1946, Alexandria, Egypt) is a scholar of Islamic art and architecture. She is professor emerita at the School of Oriental and African Studies, University of London.

She obtained her master's degree at the American University in Cairo and then her doctorate at the University of Hamburg in 1972. She subsequently held academic positions at the American University in Cairo and LMU Munich. From 2000 to 2014, she was the Nasser D. Khalili Chair of Islamic Art and Archaeology at the School of Oriental and African Studies (SOAS), University of London. Her research interests are largely focused on the arts and culture of Egypt and Syria in the Islamic period.

== Selected works ==
- Behrens-Abouseif, Doris (1989). Islamic Architecture in Cairo: An Introduction. Leiden, the Netherlands: E.J. Brill. ISBN 9789004096264.
- Behrens-Abouseif, Doris (1994). Egypt's Adjustment to Ottoman Rule: Institutions, Waqf and Architecture in Cairo (16th & 17th Centuries). Brill. ISBN 978-90-04-49311-7.
- Behrens-Abouseif, Doris (2007). Cairo of the Mamluks: A History of Architecture and its Culture. The American University in Cairo Press. ISBN 9789774160776.
- Behrens-Abouseif, Doris (2010). The Minarets of Cairo: Islamic Architecture from the Arab Conquest to the End of the Ottoman Period. Bloomsbury Academic. ISBN 978-1-84885-539-7.
- Behrens-Abouseif, Doris (2019). The Book in Mamluk Egypt and Syria (1250-1517): Scribes, Libraries and Market. Brill. ISBN 978-90-04-38700-3.
