= Bernard O'Kane (scholar) =

Irish scholar of Islam

- Awards: Farabi Award (2018)

Academic background
- Education: University of Edinburgh (PhD), Queen's University of Belfast (LLB)
- Thesis: Timurid architecture in Khurasan. (1982)
- Doctoral advisor: Robert Hillenbrand
- Website: https://www.aucegypt.edu/fac/bernardokane

Bernard O'Kane is an Irish Islamic studies scholar and Iranologist and Professor of Islamic Art and Architecture at the American University in Cairo.

He is known for his works on Islamic architecture and is a winner of Farabi International Award.

== Works ==
- Studies in Arab Architecture: The Collected Papers of Bernard O’Kane, Edinburgh, Edinburgh University Press, 2021
- Studies in Islamic Painting, Epigraphy and Decorative Arts: The Collected Papers of Bernard O’Kane, Edinburgh, Edinburgh University Press, 2021
- Studies in Persian Architecture: The Collected Papers of Bernard O’Kane, Edinburgh, Edinburgh University Press, 2021
- Mosques: the 100 Most Iconic Islamic Houses of Worship, New York, Assouline Publishers, 2019
- The Mosques of Egypt, Cairo, AUC Press, 2016
- The Illustrated Guide to the Museum of Islamic Art in Cairo, Cairo, AUC Press, 2012
- The Appearance of Persian on Islamic Art, New York, Persian Heritage Foundation, 2009
- Treasures of Islam: Artistic Glories of the Muslim World, London, Duncan Baird Publishers, 2007
- Early Persian Painting: Kalila and Dimna Manuscripts of the Late-Fourteenth Century, London, I.B. Tauris Publishers, 2003
- Studies in Persian Art and Architecture, Cairo, AUC Press, 1995
- Timurid Architecture in Khurasan, Costa Mesa, Mazdâ Publishers in association with Undena Publications, 1987
