= Memory of the World Register in Asia and the Pacific =

UNESCO initiative to preserve documentary items

UNESCO's Memory of the World International Register lists documentary heritage – texts, audio-visual materials, library and archive holdings – that have been judged to be of global importance. The register brings that heritage to the attention of experts and the wider public, promoting the preservation, digitization, and dissemination of those materials. The first inscriptions were added to the register in 1997. As of 2025, 570 pieces of documentary heritage had been included in the register. Of these, 180 are nominated or co-nominated by countries in the Asia and the Pacific region.

The Memory of the World Committee for Asia and the Pacific (MOWCAP) is a regional committee of UNESCO's programme, maintaining a separate register. There are also national registers, including for the Philippines, Australia and New Zealand.

Items listed below are part of the UNESCO Memory of the World International Register. National and regional registers are listed separately.

== List by country/territory ==
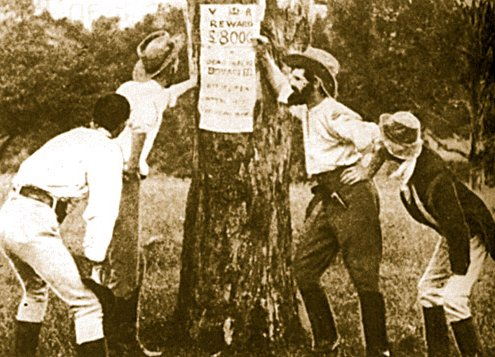
Australia's The Story of the Kelly Gang (1906) is the first full-length narrative feature film produced anywhere in the world.

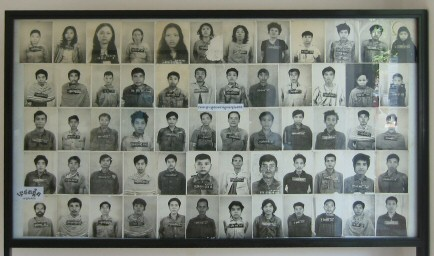
Cambodia's Tuol Sleng Genocide Museum contains photographs of over 5,000 prisoners, as well as "confessions", many extracted under torture, and other biographical records.

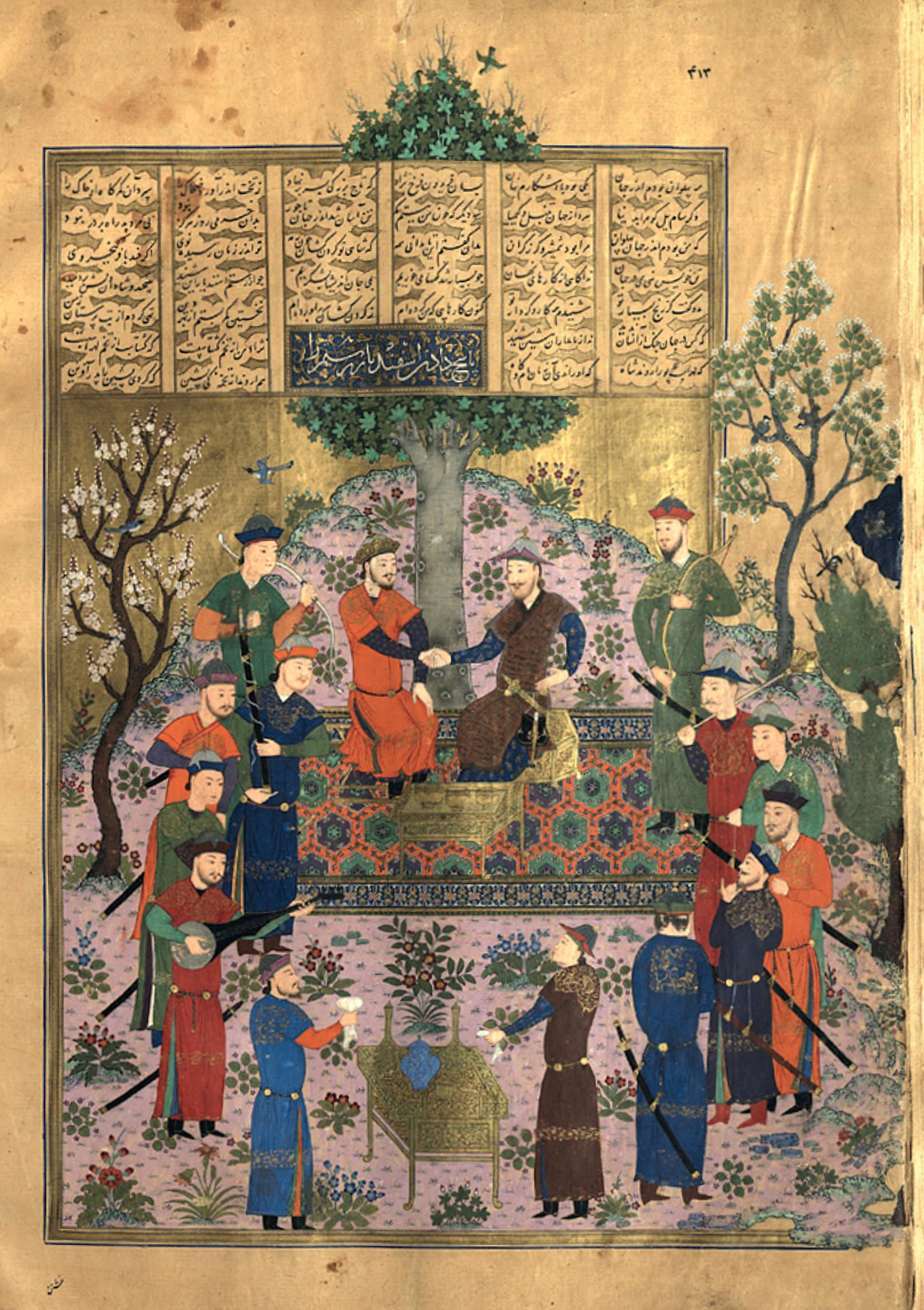
The Baysunghur Shahnameh Iran is a manuscript of the "Book of Kings", one of the classics of the Persian-speaking world, on a par with the Iliad and The Aeneid of the Greco-Roman cultural communities.

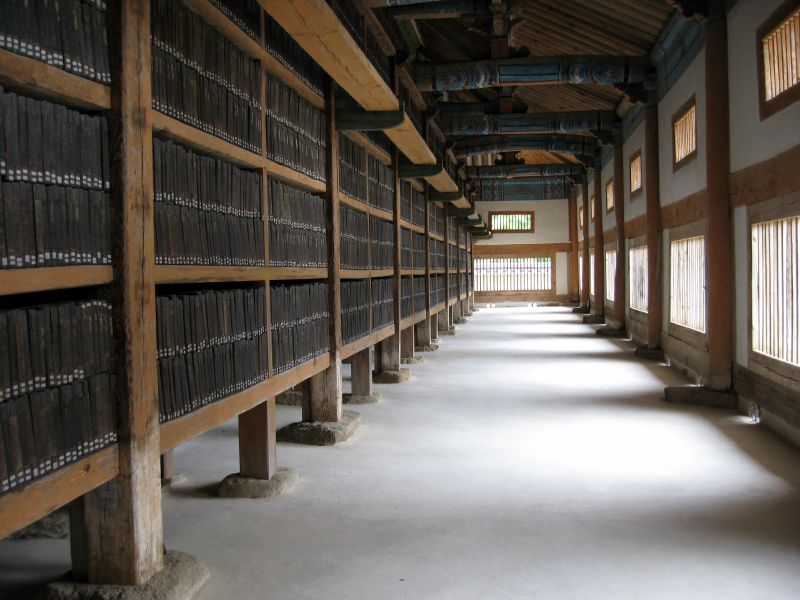
The Korean version of the Buddhist scriptures, Tripitaka Koreana, is one of the most important and is the most complete corpus of Buddhist doctrinal texts in the world.

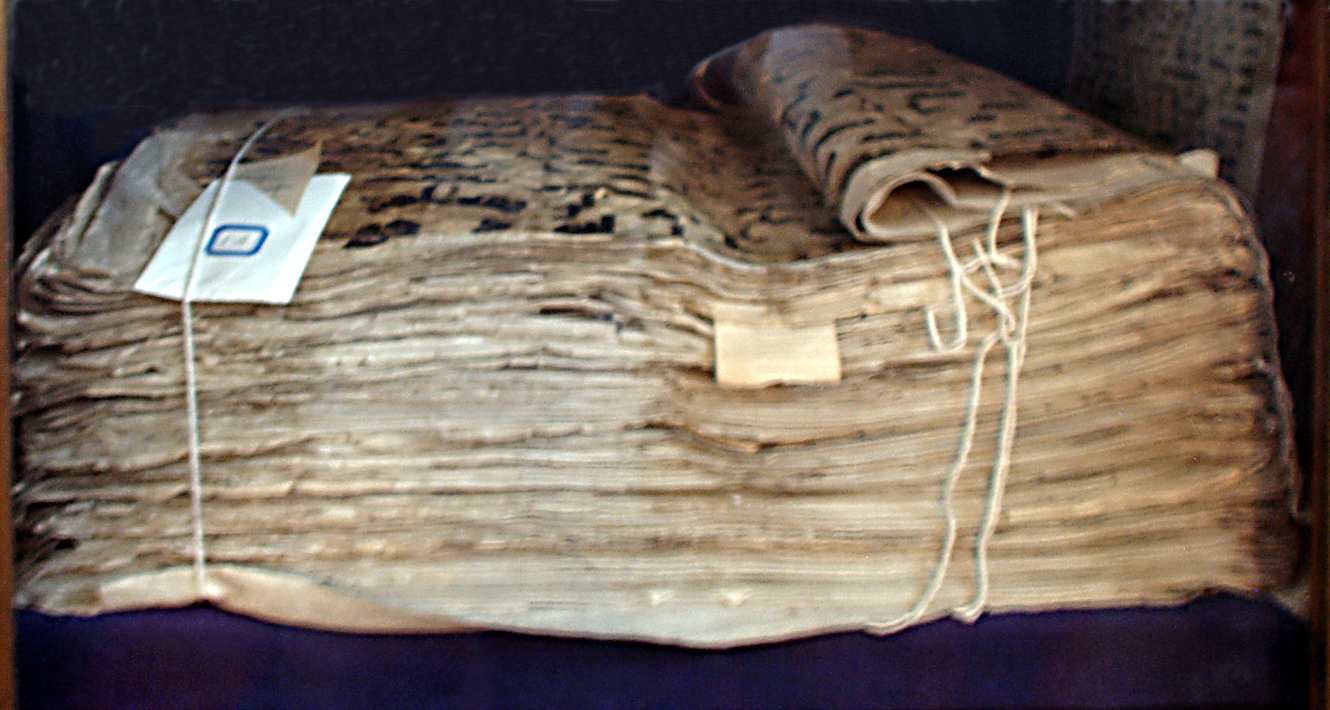
The Holy Koran Mushaf of Othman manuscript, held by the Muslim Board of Uzbekistan, is the earliest existent written version of the Koran.

Documentary heritage^{[A]}	Country/Territory	Custodian(s), Location(s)	Year inscribed	Ref.
The Endeavour Journal of James Cook	Australia	National Library of Australia, Canberra 35°17′48″S 149°07′47″E	2001	
The Mabo Case Manuscripts	Australia	National Library of Australia, Canberra 35°17′48″S 149°07′47″E	2001	
The Story of the Kelly Gang (1906)	Australia	National Film and Sound Archive, Canberra 35°17′00″S 149°07′17″E	2007	
The Convict Records of Australia	Australia	State Records Authority of New South Wales 33°46′22″S 150°44′32″E; Archives Office of Tasmania 42°52′55″S 147°19′30″E; State Records Office of Western Australia: Alexander Library Building, Perth Cultural Centre 31°56′57″S 115°51′37″E	2007	
Manifesto of the Queensland Labour Party, 1892	Australia	State Library of Queensland, Brisbane 27°28′16″S 153°01′05″E	2009	
Giant Glass Plate Negatives of Sydney Harbour	Australia	State Library of New South Wales, Sydney 33°51′58″S 151°12′48″E	2021	
Archives of the expedition of d’Entrecasteaux (1791–1794)	Australia, France	Archives nationales; Musée du quai Branly; Muséum national d'histoire naturelle; National Library of Australia	2025	
7 March Speech of Bangabandhu	Bangladesh	Liberation War Museum, Dhaka 23°46′33″N 90°22′03″E	2017	
Tuol Sleng Genocide Museum Archives	Cambodia	Tuol Sleng Genocide Museum, Phnom Penh 11°32′58″N 104°54′55″E	2009	
Traditional Music Sound Archives	China	Chinese Academy of Arts, Beijing 39°57′02″N 116°26′51″E	1997	
Records of the Qing's Grand Secretariat – 'Infiltration of Western Culture in China'	China	Palace Museum, Beijing 39°54′59″N 116°23′50″E	1999	
Ancient Naxi Dongba Literature Manuscripts	China	Lijiang Prefecture Dongba Research Institute, Dayan 26°52′53″N 100°12′35″E	2003	
Golden Lists of the Qing Dynasty Imperial Examination	China	State Archives, Beijing 39°54′54″N 116°23′35″E	2005	
Qing Dynasty Yangshi Lei Archives	China	The First Historical Archives 39°54′54″N 116°23′35″E; National Library of China, Beijing 39°56′35″N 116°19′23″E; Palace Museum, Beijing 39°54′59″N 116°23′50″E	2007	
Ben Cao Gang Mu: Compendium of Materia Medica	China	Library of the China Academy of Chinese Medical Sciences 39°54′39″N 116°25′03″E	2011	
Huang Di Nei Jing (Yellow Emperor's Inner Canon)	China	National Library of China, Beijing 39°56′35″N 116°19′23″E	2011	
Official Records of Tibet from the Yuan Dynasty China, 1304–1367	China	Tibet Autonomous Region Archives, Lhasa 29°39′23″N 91°04′57″E	2013	
Qiaopi and Yinxin Correspondence and Remittance Documents from Overseas Chinese	China	Guangdong Provincial Archives 23°07′47″N 113°16′18″E; Chaoshan Research Institute for History and Culture 23°22′24″N 116°42′48″E; Shantou Municipal Archives 23°22′06″N 116°42′39″E; Jiangmen Wuyi Overseas Chinese Museum 22°36′48″N 113°05′04″E; Meizhou City Qiaopi Archives 24°18′36″N 116°07′00″E; Kaiping Cultural Heritage Bureau 22°22′35″N 112°41′55″E; Fujian Province Archives 26°02′41″N 119°12′14″E; Quanzhou City Archives 24°54′27″N 118°35′13″E; Jinjiang City Archives 24°47′02″N 118°33′04″E; Jinjiang Municipal Museum 24°47′42″N 118°33′45″E; Quanzhou Museum of Overseas Chinese History 24°54′44″N 118°36′24″E	2013	
Documents of Nanjing Massacre	China	Central Archives of China 40°02′34″N 116°09′55″E; The Second Historical Archives of China 32°02′26″N 118°48′51″E; Liaoning Provincial Archives 41°46′53″N 123°24′18″E; Jilin Provincial Archives 43°53′24″N 125°19′33″E; Shanghai Municipal Archives 31°12′18″N 121°23′55″E; Nanjing City Archives 32°03′30″N 118°47′48″E; The Memorial Hall of the Victims in Nanjing Massacre by Japanese Invaders 32°02′09″N 118°44′33″E	2015	
The Archives of Suzhou Silk from Modern and Contemporary Times	China	Suzhou Industrial and Commercial Archives Administration 31°19′35″N 120°37′35″E	2017	
Chinese Oracle-Bone Inscriptions	China	Institute of Archaeology, Chinese Academy of Social Sciences 39°55′21″N 116°24′38″E; Institute of History, Chinese Academy of Social Sciences 39°55′21″N 116°24′36″E; National Library of China 39°56′35″N 116°19′23″E; Palace Museum, Beijing 39°54′59″N 116°23′50″E; Peking University Library 39°59′31″N 116°18′35″E; Tsinghua University Library 40°00′18″N 116°19′29″E; Shanghai Museum 31°13′42″N 121°28′32″E; Nanjing Museum 32°02′30″N 118°49′32″E; Shandong Provincial Museum 36°39′31″N 117°05′45″E; Lvshun Museum 38°48′29″N 121°14′02″E; Tianjin Museum 39°05′08″N 117°12′32″E	2017	
Official Records of Macao During the Qing Dynasty (1693–1886)	China, Portugal	Torre do Tombo National Archive, Alvalade, Lisbon 38°45′17″N 9°09′23″W	2017	
Archives and Manuscripts of Macau Kong Tac Lam Temple (1645–1980)	China	Association of Piety and Longevity Kong Tac Lam, Macau 22°11′30″N 113°32′10″E	2023	
The four treatises of Tibetan Medicine	China	Mentseekhang, Traditional Tibetan Hospital (Tibetan Medical & Astro Institute), Lhasa 29°39′48″N 91°07′27″E	2023	
The Steles of Shaolin Temple (566–1990)	China	Shaolin Monastery	2025	
The Suizhou Bianzhong of Marquis Yi of Zeng	China	Hubei Provincial Museum	2025	
Records of the Indian Indentured Labourers	Fiji, Guyana, Suriname, Trinidad and Tobago	National Archives of Fiji 18°08′34″S 178°25′27″E; National Archives of Guyana 6°48′10″N 58°08′26″W; National Archives of Suriname 5°48′39″N 55°12′42″W; National Archives of Trinidad and Tobago 10°39′37″N 61°30′46″W	2011	
The I.A.S. Tamil Medical Manuscript Collection	India	Institute of Asian Studies, Chennai 12°51′48″N 80°13′47″E	1997	
Archives of the Dutch East India Company	India, Indonesia, Netherlands, South Africa, Sri Lanka	Cape Town Archives Repository (Office of the National Archives of South Africa) 33°55′53″S 18°25′26″E; Madras Record Office (Tamil Nadu Archives) 13°04′35″N 80°15′38″E; Department of National Archives of Sri Lanka 6°54′24″N 79°51′53″E; National Archives of Indonesia (Arsip Nasional Republik Indonesia) 6°16′43″S 106°49′08″E; Nationaal Archief (National Archives of the Netherlands) 52°04′52″N 4°19′35″E	2003	
Shaiva Manuscript in Pondicherry	India	French Institute of Pondicherry, Pondicherry 11°56′13″N 79°50′08″E	2005	
Rigveda	India	Bhandarkar Oriental Research Institute, Pune 18°31′09″N 73°49′48″E	2007	
Tarikh-e-Khandan-e-Timuriyah	India	Khuda Bakhsh Oriental Library, Patna 25°37′18″N 85°08′08″E	2011	
Laghukālachakratantrarājatīka Vimalaprabhā	India	The Asiatic Society, Kolkata 22°33′19″N 88°21′02″E	2011	
Shāntinātha Charitra	India	Lalbhai Dalpatbhai Museum, Ahmedabad 23°01′59″N 72°32′59″E	2013	
Gilgit Manuscript	India	National Archives of India, New Delhi 28°36′56″N 77°13′02″E	2017	
Maitreyayvarakarana	India	The Asiatic Society, Kolkata 22°33′19″N 88°21′02″E	2017	
Manuscript Collection of Bhagavadgītā: Ancient Saṁgraha-grantha of Indian thought with World-wide Readership and Influence	India	Bhandarkar Oriental Research Institute, Pune	2025	
Manuscript of the Nāṭyaśāstra of Bharatamuni: A Seminal text of Indian Performing Art	India	Bhandarkar Oriental Research Institute, Pune	2025	
La Galigo	Indonesia, Netherlands	Fort Rotterdam, Makassar 5°08′02″S 119°24′19″E; Leiden University Library, Leiden 52°09′26″N 4°28′53″E	2011	
Nagarakretagama: Description of the Country (1365 AD)	Indonesia	National Library of Indonesia, Jakarta 6°10′53″S 106°49′37″E	2013	
Babad Diponegoro	Indonesia, Netherlands	National Library of Indonesia, Jakarta 6°10′53″S 106°49′37″E; Royal Netherlands Institute of Southeast Asian and Caribbean Studies 52°09′31″N 4°28′57″E	2013	
Asian-African Conference Archives	Indonesia	National Archives of Indonesia, South Jakarta 6°16′43″S 106°49′08″E	2015	
Borobudur Conservation Archives	Indonesia	National Archives of Indonesia, South Jakarta 6°16′43″S 106°49′08″E	2017	
The Indian Ocean Tsunami Archives	Indonesia, Sri Lanka	National Archives of Indonesia, South Jakarta 6°16′43″S 106°49′08″E; Department of National Archives of Sri Lanka 6°54′24″N 79°51′53″E	2017	
Panji Tales Manuscripts	Indonesia, Cambodia, Netherlands, Malaysia, United Kingdom	Leiden University Library, Leiden 52°09′26″N 4°28′53″E; National Library of Indonesia, Jakarta 6°10′53″S 106°49′37″E; National Library of Malaysia, Kuala Lumpur 3°10′14″N 101°42′41″E; National Library of Cambodia, Phnom Penh 11°34′35″N 104°55′10″E	2017	
Archives of Javanese Dance: Mangkunegaran Dance Arts, 1861–1944	Indonesia	National Archives of Indonesia; Mangkunegaran Palace	2025	
Kartini Letters and Archive: the struggle for gender equality	Indonesia, Netherlands	National Archives of Indonesia; Royal Institute of Southeast Asian and Caribbean Studies, Leiden; Nationaal Archief	2025	
The Sang Hyang Siksa Kandang Karesian Manuscript	Indonesia	National Library of Indonesia, Jakarta 6°10′53″S 106°49′37″E	2025	
"Bayasanghori Shâhnâmeh" (Prince Bayasanghor's Book of the Kings)	Iran	Golestan Palace, Tehran 35°40′47″N 51°25′14″E	2007	
The Deed For Endowment: Rab’ I-Rashidi (Rab I-Rashidi Endowment) 13th Century manuscript	Iran	Tabriz Central Library, Tabriz 38°03′51″N 46°15′23″E	2007	
Administrative Documents of Astan-e Quds Razavi in the Safavid Era	Iran	Astan-e Quds Razavi Library, Mashhad 36°17′22″N 59°36′58″E	2009	
Al-Tafhim li Awa'il Sana'at al-Tanjim: The Book of Instruction in the Elements of the Art of Astrology	Iran	Library, Museum and Documentation Centre of the Islamic Consultative Assembly, Tehran 35°48′30″N 51°27′31″E	2011	
Collection of Nezami's Panj Ganj	Iran	Sepahsalar Library (Shahid Mottahri) 35°41′22″N 51°25′52″E; Malek National Museum and Library, Tehran 35°41′13″N 51°24′59″E; Golestan Palace, Tehran 35°40′47″N 51°25′14″E; National Museum of Iran, Tehran 35°41′14″N 51°24′53″E; Central Library and document centre of the University of Tehran 35°42′12″N 51°23′43″E	2011	
A Collection of selected maps of Iran in the Qajar Era (1193 – 1344 Lunar Calendar / 1779–1926 Gregorian Calendar)	Iran	Library of Political and International Studies of the Iranian Ministry of Foreign Affairs 35°48′30″N 51°27′31″E	2013	
Dhakhīra-yi Khārazmshāhī	Iran	Library of the Sepahsalar Mosque, Tehran 35°41′22″N 51°26′00″E	2013	
Al-Masaalik Wa Al-Mamaalik: The Book of Itineraries and Kingdoms	Germany, Iran	National Library and Archives of Iran, Tehran 35°45′07″N 51°26′03″E; Gotha Research Library, Erfurt 50°56′43″N 10°42′20″E	2015	
Kulliyyāt-i Saʽdi: Kulliyat of Saadi	Iran	National Library and Archives of Iran, Tehran 35°45′07″N 51°26′03″E	2015	
Jāme’ al-Tavarikh: Compendium of Chronicles	Iran	Golestan Palace, Tehran 50°56′43″N 10°42′20″E	2017	
Mawlana's Kulliyat (The Complete Works of Mawlana)	Iran, Tajikistan, Germany, Bulgaria, Uzbekistan, Turkey	SS. Cyril and Methodius National Library, Sofia 42°41′41″N 23°20′10″E; State Library, Berlin 52°31′03″N 13°23′30″E; Bavarian State Library 48°08′51″N 11°34′49″E; Iranian National Committee for the Memory of the World; The National Library and Archives of Iran 35°45′07″N 51°26′03″E; Golestan Palace Library, Tehran 35°40′47″N 51°25′14″E; Written Heritage Research Institute (Mīrās-e Maktoob), Tehran 35°42′06″N 51°23′56″E; Centre of the Written Heritage of the National Academy of Sciences of Tajikistan, Dushanbe 38°34′08″N 68°47′27″E; Turkish National Commission for UNESCO, National Memory of the World Committee; Al-Biruni Institute of Oriental Studies, Academy of Sciences of the Republic of Uzbekistan 41°18′24″N 69°17′12″E	2023	
Sakubei Yamamoto Collection	Japan	Tagawa City Coal Mining Historical Museum 33°38′27″N 130°48′50″E; Fukuoka Prefectural University Library 33°39′01″N 130°48′50″E	2011	
Materials Related to the Keicho-era Mission to Europe Japan and Spain	Japan, Spain	Sendai City Museum, Sendai 38°15′22″N 140°51′24″E	2013	
Midokanpakuki: the original handwritten diary of Fujiwara no Michinaga	Japan	Yōmei Bunko, Kyoto 35°01′55″N 135°42′36″E	2013	
Archives of Tōji temple contained in one-hundred boxes	Japan	Kyoto Prefectural Library, Kyoto 35°00′47″N 135°46′56″E	2015	
Return to Maizuru Port—Documents Related to the Internment and Repatriation Experiences of Japanese (1945–1956)	Japan	Maizuru Repatriation Memorial Museum, Kyoto 35°30′34″N 135°23′48″E	2015	
Three Cherished Stelae of Ancient Kozuke	Japan	Takasaki, Gunma 36°19′19″N 139°00′12″E	2017	
Three Editions of Buddhist Sacred Canons stored at Zojoji, Japan	Japan	Zōjō-ji Temple, Minato	2025	
Collection of manuscripts of Khoja Ahmed Yasawi	Kazakhstan	National Library of the Republic of Kazakhstan, Almaty 43°14′29″N 76°56′35″E	2003	
Audiovisual documents of the International antinuclear movement "Nevada-Semipalatinsk"	Kazakhstan	Central State Archives of the Republic of Kazakhstan, Almaty 43°14′34″N 76°56′44″E	2005	
Aral Sea Archival Fonds	Kazakhstan	Central State Archives of the Republic of Kazakhstan, Almaty 43°14′34″N 76°56′44″E	2011	
Manuscript “Chronicle of Khans”	Kazakhstan	Ministry of Science and Higher Education of the Republic of Kazakhstan, Almaty	2025	
Correspondence of the late Sultan of Kedah (1882–1943)	Malaysia	National Archives of Malaysia, Alor Setar 6°09′48″N 100°22′12″E	2001	
Hikayat Hang Tuah: The story of Hang Tuah	Malaysia	National Library of Malaysia, Kuala Lumpur 3°10′14″N 101°42′41″E	2001	
Sejarah Melayu (the Malay Annals)	Malaysia	Institute of Language and Literature, Kuala Lumpur 3°08′03″N 101°42′13″E	2001	
Batu Bersurat, Terengganu (Inscribed Stone of Terengganu)	Malaysia	Terengganu State Museum, Kuala Terengganu 5°19′07″N 103°06′08″E	2009	
The Works of Hamzah Fansuri	Malaysia, Indonesia	National Library of Malaysia, Kuala Lumpur 3°10′14″N 101°42′41″E; National Library of Indonesia, Jakarta 6°10′53″S 106°49′37″E	2025	
Lu."Altan Tobchi" : Golden History written in 1651	Mongolia	National Library of Mongolia, Ulaanbaatar 47°54′53″N 106°54′59″E	2011	
Mongolian Tanjur & Stone Stele Monument for Mongolian Tanjur	Mongolia	National Library of Mongolia, Ulaanbaatar 47°54′53″N 106°54′59″E	2011, updated 2017	
Kanjur written with 9 precious stones	Mongolia	National Library of Mongolia, Ulaanbaatar 47°54′53″N 106°54′59″E	2013	
Deger-e-eče toɣtoɣsan dürsü-yin tusbür-yig bürüdkegsen bičig (A Complete Record of the Body by Imperial Order)	Mongolia	Mongolian Academy of Sciences, Ulaanbaatar	2025	
Inscription of Khüis Tolgoi 1	Mongolia	The National Council for Language Policies Subordinate to the President of Mongolia, Ulaanbataar	2025	
Kuthodaw Inscription Shrines	Myanmar	Kuthodaw Pagoda, Mandalay 22°00′17″N 96°06′47″E	2013	
Myazedi Quadrilingual Stone Inscription	Myanmar	Department of Archaeology and National Museum, Naypyidaw 19°47′20″N 96°08′29″E	2015	
The Golden Letter of the Burmese King Alaungphaya to King George II of Great Britain	Myanmar, Germany, United Kingdom	Gottfried Wilhelm Leibniz Library – State Library of Lower Saxony 52°21′55″N 9°43′51″E	2015	
King Bayinnaung Bell Inscription	Myanmar	Shwezigon Pagoda, Bagan 21°11′43″N 94°53′38″E	2017	
Nishvāsattatvasamhitā Manuscript	Nepal	National Archives of Nepal, Kathmandu 27°41′43″N 85°19′17″E	2013	
Sushrutasamhitā (Sahottārtantra) Manuscript	Nepal	Kaiser library, Kathmandu 27°42′50″N 85°18′55″E	2013	
Treaty of Waitangi	New Zealand	Archives New Zealand, Wellington 41°16′37″S 174°46′48″E	1997	
1893 Women's Suffrage Petition	New Zealand	Archives New Zealand, Wellington 41°16′37″S 174°46′48″E	1997	
Sir Edmund Hillary Archive	New Zealand	Auckland War Memorial Museum, Auckland 36°51′37″S 174°46′40″E	2013	
Katherine Mansfield literary and personal papers and belongings	New Zealand	Alexander Turnbull Library, Wellington 41°16′36″S 174°46′42″E	2025	
Comprehensive Illustrated Manual of Martial arts	North Korea	Grand People's Study House, Pyongyang; Various locations in South Korea 39°01′13″N 125°44′58″E	2017	
Jinnah Papers (Quaid-i-Azam)	Pakistan	National Archives of Pakistan, Islamabad 33°44′24″N 73°05′41″E	1999	
Philippine Paleographs (Hanunoo, Buid, Tagbanua and Pala'wan)	Philippines	National Museum of the Philippines, Manila 14°35′13″N 120°58′52″E	1999	
Radio Broadcast of the Philippine People Power Revolution	Philippines	Radio Veritas Asia, Quezon City 14°42′01″N 121°04′18″E; Rajah Broadcasting Network, Makati 14°33′10″N 121°00′49″E; Personal Archives of Mr. Orly Punzalan, Dasmariñas 14°17′00″N 120°57′41″E	2003	
José Maceda Collection	Philippines	University of the Philippines Center for Ethnomusicology, Quezon City 14°39′26″N 121°03′56″E	2007	
Presidential Papers of Manuel L. Quezon	Philippines	University of the Philippines Center for Ethnomusicology, Quezon City 14°39′26″N 121°03′56″E	2011	
The Khludov Psalter	Russia	State Historical Museum, Moscow	2025	
Hunminjeongum Manuscript: Correct Sounds for the Instruction of the People	South Korea	Gansong Art Museum, Seoul 37°35′37″N 126°59′49″E	1997	
The Annals of the Choson Dynasty	South Korea	Chongjoksan Sagobon, Odaesan Sagobon and Sanyoppon 37°27′37″N 126°57′13″E; T'aebaeksan Sagobon 35°10′42″N 129°05′02″E	1997	
Seungjeongwon ilgi, the Diaries of the Royal Secretariat	South Korea	Kyujanggak Library and Seoul National University, Seoul 37°34′44″N 126°59′22″E	2001	
Baegun hwasang chorok buljo jikji simche yojeol (vol. II), the second volume of "Anthology of Great Buddhist Priests’ Zen Teachings"	South Korea	Bibliothèque nationale de France, Paris 48°50′01″N 2°22′33″E	2001	
Printing woodblocks of the Tripitaka Koreana and miscellaneous Buddhist scriptures	South Korea	Haeinsa Monastery, Gyeongsangnam-do 35°48′04″N 128°05′53″E	2007	
Uigwe: The Royal Protocols of the Joseon Dynasty	South Korea	Seoul National University, Seoul 37°27′33″N 126°57′07″E	2007	
Dongui Bogam: Principles and Practice of Eastern Medicine	South Korea	National Library of Korea, Seoul 37°29′52″N 127°00′13″E	2009	
Human Rights Documentary Heritage 1980 Archives for the May 18th Democratic Uprising against Military Regime, in Gwangju, Republic of Korea	South Korea	Gwangju City Hall 35°09′36″N 126°51′05″E; May 18 Memorial Foundation, Gwangju 35°08′58″N 126°55′00″E; Chonnam National University, Gwangju 35°10′37″N 126°54′21″E	2011	
Ilseongnok: Records of Daily Reflections	South Korea	Seoul National University, Seoul 37°27′33″N 126°57′07″E	2011	
Nanjung ilgi: War Diary of Admiral Yi Sun-sin	South Korea	Hyeonchungsa Shrine, Asan 36°48′23″N 127°01′55″E	2013	
Archives of Saemaul Undong (New Community Movement)	South Korea	National Archives of Korea, Seoul 36°21′39″N 127°23′08″E; Korea Saemaul Undong Center 37°30′09″N 127°04′02″E	2013	
Confucian Printing Woodblocks	South Korea	The Advanced Center for Korean Studies, Andong 36°42′08″N 128°48′39″E	2015	
The Archives of the KBS Special Live Broadcast "Finding Dispersed Families"	South Korea	KBS, Seoul 37°31′33″N 126°54′58″E; National Archives of Korea 36°21′39″N 127°23′08″E; Gallup Korea 37°34′26″N 126°58′02″E	2015	
Royal Seal and Investiture Book Collection of the Joseon Dynasty	South Korea	National Palace Museum of Korea, Seoul 37°34′36″N 126°58′30″E	2017	
Archives of the National Debt Redemption Movement	South Korea	National Debt Redemption Movement Memorial Park 35°52′10″N 128°36′22″E	2017	
Documents on Joseon Tongsinsa/Chosen Tsushinshi: The History of Peace Building and Cultural Exchanges between Korea and Japan from the 17th to 19th Century	South Korea, Japan	Seoul National University Kyujanggak Institute for Korean Studies 37°27′44″N 126°57′01″E; National Library of Korea 37°29′52″N 127°00′13″E; National Institute of Korean History 37°25′27″N 126°58′47″E; Korea University Library 37°35′05″N 127°01′35″E; Chungnam Institute of History and Culture 36°29′21″N 127°08′48″E; National Museum of Korea 37°31′26″N 126°58′49″E; Busan Museum 35°07′47″N 129°05′39″E; National Palace Museum of Korea 37°34′36″N 126°58′30″E; Korea National Maritime Museum 35°04′43″N 129°04′49″E	2017	
Collection of documents from Mount Mugh	South Korea, Uzbekistan	International Institute for Central Asian Studies, Samarkand; International Center for Documentary Heritage, North Chungcheong	2025	
Korea Reforestation Archives: A reforestation model achieved through public-private governance	South Korea	Korea Society of Forest Policy, Seoul	2025	
Revealing Truth: Jeju 4·3 Archives	South Korea	Jeju Special Self-Governing Provincial Government, Jeju-si; Jeju 4·3 Peace Foundation, Jeju-si; National Archives of Korea, Daejeon; Jeju 4·3 Research Institute, Jeju-si; Jeju Folklore and Natural History Museum, Jeju-si; Hagwi-ri Village Development Council, Jeju-si	2025	
Mahavamsa (6th century BCE to 1815 CE)	Sri Lanka	Palm Leaf Manuscripts Collection, University of Peradeniya 7°15′15″N 80°35′48″E	2023	
Documents Connected with the Pānadurā Vādaya (The Great Debate of Panadura) in 1873	Sri Lanka	National Library and Documentation Services Board	2025	
Trilingual Inscription (TribhashaSellipiya)	Sri Lanka, China	Colombo National Museum, Colombo	2025	
The manuscript of Ubayd Zakoni's Kulliyat and Hafez Sherozi's Gazalliyt (14th century)	Tajikistan	Institute of the Written Heritage of the Academy of Sciences, Dushanbe 38°34′15″N 68°47′31″E	2003	
The King Ram Khamhaeng Inscription	Thailand	Bangkok National Museum, Bangkok 13°45′30″N 100°29′30″E	2003	
Archival Documents of King Chulalongkorn's Transformation of Siam (1868–1910)	Thailand	National Library of Thailand, Bangkok 13°46′20″N 100°30′18″E; National Archives of Thailand, Bangkok 13°46′23″N 100°30′16″E	2009	
Epigraphic Archives of Wat Pho	Thailand	Wat Pho, Bangkok 13°44′48″N 100°29′36″E	2011	
"The Minute Books of the Council of the Siam Society", 100 years of recording international cooperation in research and the dissemination of knowledge in the arts and sciences	Thailand	National Archives of Thailand, Bangkok 13°46′23″N 100°30′16″E	2013	
The Royal Photographic Glass Plate Negatives and Original Prints Collection	Thailand	National Archives of Thailand, Bangkok 13°46′23″N 100°30′16″E	2017	
National Collection of Palm-Leaf Manuscripts of Phra That Phanom Chronicle	Thailand	National Library of Thailand, Bangkok 13°46′20″N 100°30′18″E	2023	
The Birth of the Association of Southeast Asia Nations (ASEAN) (Archives about the Formation ASEAN, 1967 – 1976)	Thailand, Malaysia, Singapore, Indonesia	National Archives of Indonesia, Jakarta; National Archives of Malaysia, Kuala Lumpur; National Archives of Singapore; Thai Film Archive, Salaya	2025	
The King of the White Elephant and the archival documents	Thailand	Thai Film Archive, Salaya; Thammasat University, Bangkok	2025	
The Manuscript of Nanthopananthasut Kamlaung (22 July 1736)	Thailand	National Library of Thailand, Bangkok	2025	
On the Birth of a Nation: Turning points (Max Stahl collection of audiovisual documents)	Timor Leste	Archives & Museum of East Timorese Resistance 8°33′20″S 125°34′39″E	2013	
Holy Koran Mushaf of Othman	Uzbekistan	The Muslim Board of Uzbekistan, Tashkent 41°19′32″N 69°14′29″E	1997	
The Collection of the Al-Biruni Institute of Oriental Studies	Uzbekistan	Academy of Sciences, Tashkent 41°18′24″N 69°17′12″E	1997	
Archives of the Chancellery of Khiva Khans	Uzbekistan	Central State Archive of the Republic of Uzbekistan, Tashkent 41°17′15″N 69°13′44″E	2017	
The Qushbegi Chancellery of the Bukhara Emirate	Uzbekistan	Central State Archive of the Republic of Uzbekistan, Tashkent 41°17′15″N 69°13′44″E	2023	
Camiu't Tevarih/Jāmiʿ al-Tawārīkh	Uzbekistan, Turkey	Al-Biruni Institute of Oriental Studies, Tashkent; Topkapı Palace Museum Library	2025	
Arthur Bernard Deacon (1903–27) collection MS 90–98	Vanuatu, United Kingdom	Royal Anthropological Institute, London 51°31′26″N 0°08′24″W	2013	
Woodblocks of the Nguyễn Dynasty	Vietnam	State Records and Archives Department of Vietnam, Hanoi 21°01′57″N 105°48′33″E	2009	
Stone stele records of imperial examinations of the Lê and Mạc dynasties	Vietnam	Temple of Literature 21°01′46″N 105°50′10″E	2010	
Imperial Archives of Nguyen Dynasty (1802–1945)	Vietnam	National Archives Centre No.1, Hanoi 21°01′01″N 105°47′53″E	2017	
Composer Hoàng Vân Collection	Vietnam	Mrs LÊ Y Linh, Dr. in Musicology, representing the composer's family	2025	

== See also ==
- List of Memory of the World Documentary Heritage in the Philippines
- Suyat

== Notes ==
Names and spellings provided are based on the official list released by the Memory of the World Programme.
