= Francis Chit =

Thai photographer

- จิตร
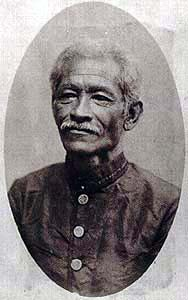
- Born: Chit c. 1830; Siam
- Died: May 23, 1891; Siam
- Occupations: Photographer; courtier
- Known for: Royal court photographer for Kings Mongkut and Chulalongkorn
- Children: 6
- Awards: Pushpa Mala Medal; Royal Warrant; Bronze medal at the World's Columbian Exposition (awarded to his studio under his sons)

Francis Chit, born Chit (Thai: จิตร; 1830 – 23 May 1891) (Note: Thai pronunciation: [tɕʰìt]; also spelled Chitr.) and known by the noble titles Khun Sunthonsathitsalak (Note: ขุนสุนทรสาทิศลักษณ์; contemporary spellings include Khoon Soondr Sadislacks and Khoon Soondr Sadislax.) and Luang Akani Naruemitr, (Note: หลวงอัคนีนฤมิตร, RTGS: Luang Akkhaninaruemit) was a Thai photographer and the first to practise the craft professionally. He worked as a royal court photographer for kings Mongkut (Rama IV) and Chulalongkorn (Rama V), and also operated out of his studio, known in its later days as Francis Chit and Sons, which occupied a floating house in the Kudi Chin neighbourhood. He contributed significantly to the photographic record of Siam, and the originals of his works now form part of the National Archives' royal collection, which has been inscribed in the UNESCO's Memory of the World Register.

== Biography ==
Chit was born c. 1830, a son of a military marksman of the Front Palace named Tueng (ตึง). Little of his personal life was documented, though he was probably a Catholic member of the Kudi Chin community, with partial Portuguese ancestry; he had the baptismal name Francis.

Chit probably learned daguerreotype photography around 1847 from the French missionary priest Louis François Larnaudie, who had introduced photographic equipment to Siam in 1845, or the bishop Jean-Baptiste Pallegoix. Chit adopted the collodion process around a decade later, probably having learned the technique from Luang Wisutyothamat (widely regarded as the first Thai photographer) and Swiss photographer Pierre Rossier, who visited Bangkok in 1861. (Note: While some sources state, based on writings of Prince Damrong Rajanubhab, that Chit also learned the craft from Scottish photographer John Thomson, later researchers regard this as unlikely.) He established his own studio in 1863, occupying a floating house near Santa Cruz Church, the first Thai person to take up photography as a profession. He advertised his business in many of the fledgling Thai and English newspapers of the time. For instance, one such piece is found in the 24 November 1864 issue of The Siam Times and another one in the 16 January 1865 issue of the Bangkok Recorder, advertising the sale of prints as well as visits for portraiture services.

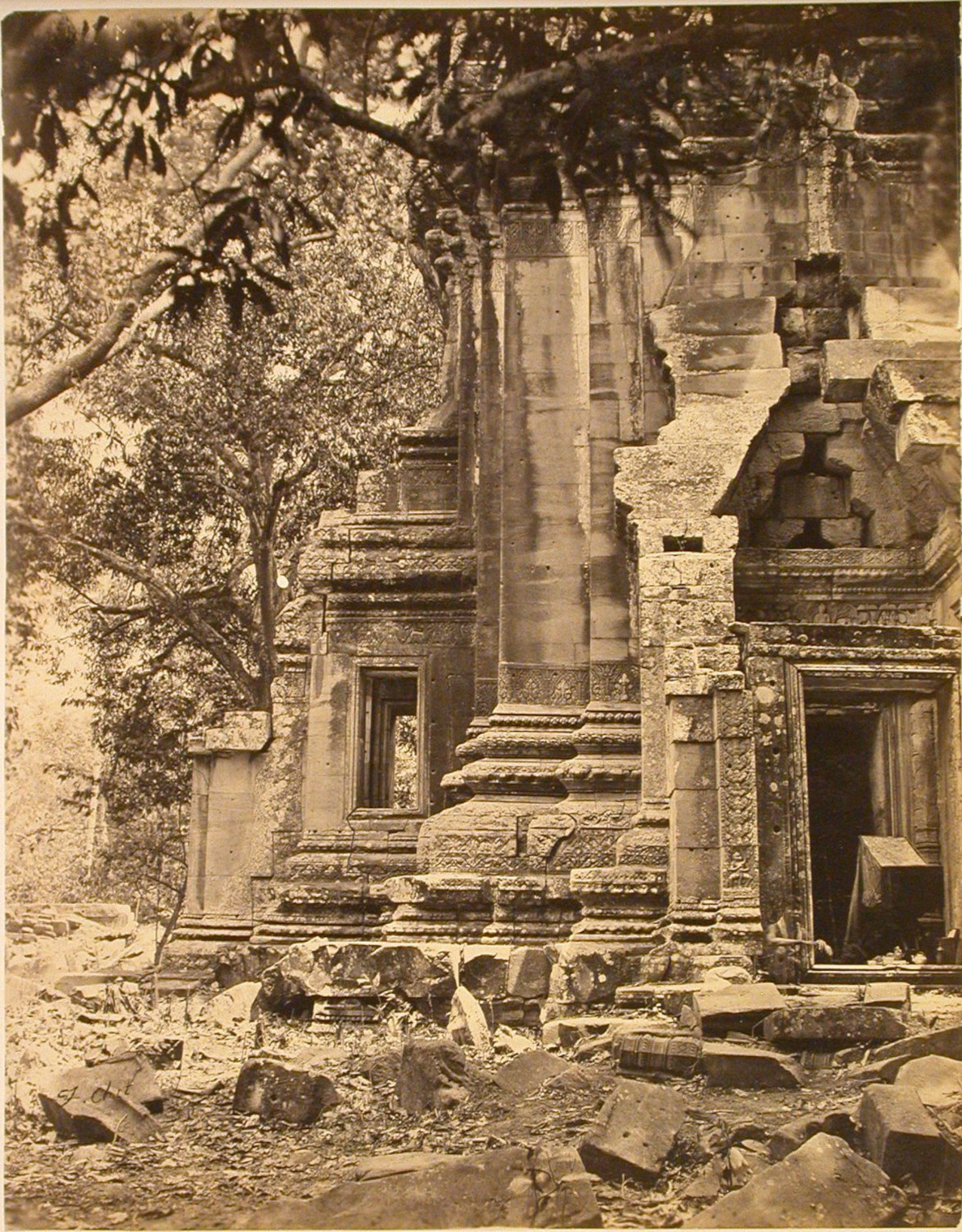
Partial view of the ruins of Phimai, 1867

In his government service, Chit was a royal servant of the Front Palace under Second-King Pinklao until Pinklao's death in 1866, when he transferred to serve the Royal Palace of King Mongkut. He received the noble title Khun Sunthonsathitsalak ('officer for fine likeness images'), and served under the department of the royal armoury. Other from royal portraiture, major works he produced in this official capacity include an expedition to photograph the ruins of Phimai (now Phimai Historical Park in Nakhon Ratchasima Province), as well as photographing the total solar eclipse of 18 August 1868, in which he was part of the royal entourage observing the phenomenon at the village of Wa Ko (now in Prachuap Khiri Khan Province).

Mongkut died shortly after the eclipse, possibly due to malaria contracted during the expedition, and Chit continued to serve under his son and successor Chulalongkorn. He documented many royal events, and accompanied the King on his visits to Singapore and Java and to British India, though no photographs from the trips are clearly attributable to him.

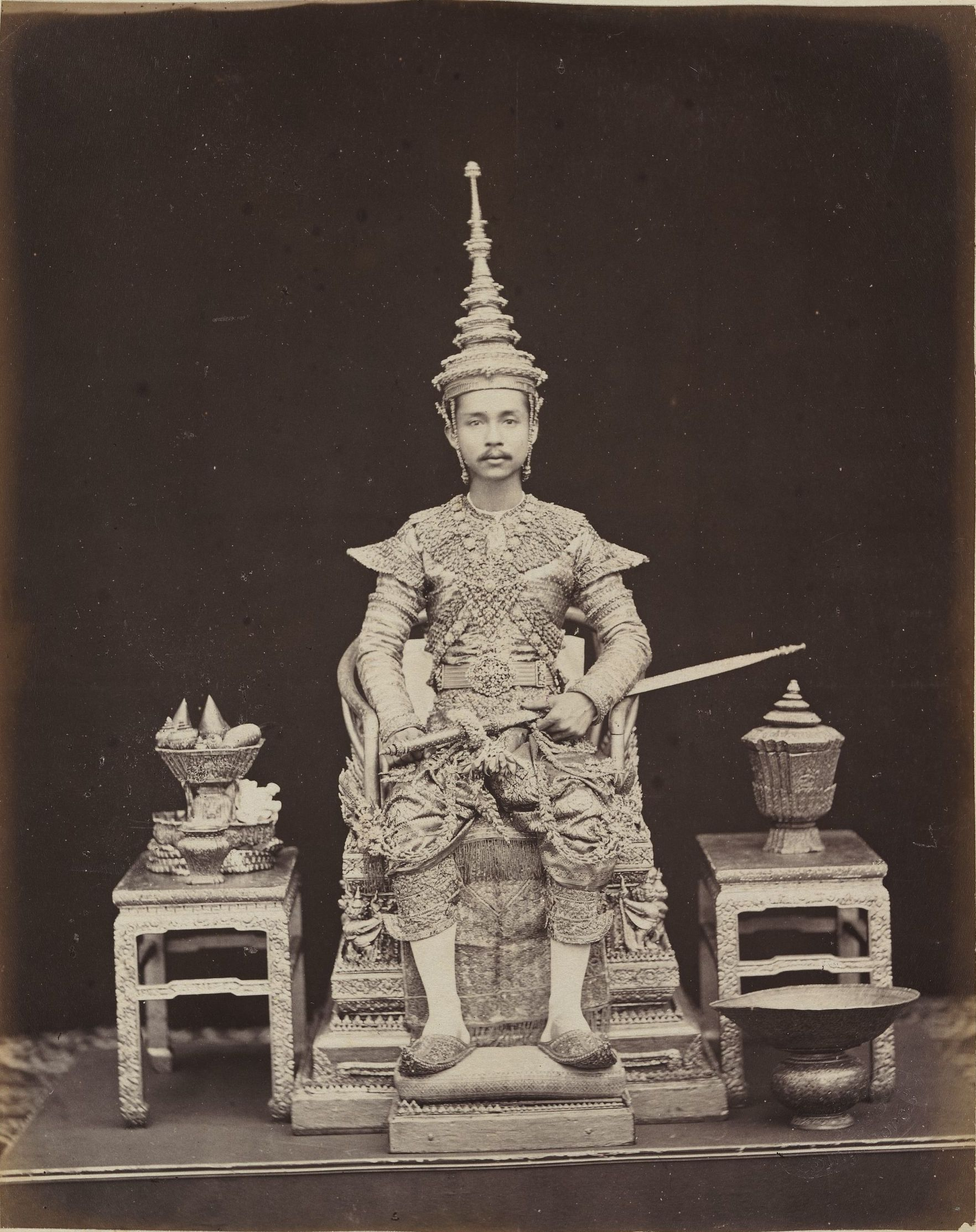
Portrait of King Chulalongkorn at his second coronation, 1873.

In 1880, Chit was made head of the newly created royal gas department, in charge of the city's gas lighting, and was promoted to the title Luang Akkhaninaruemit ('officer of fire making'), as he had learned the science from the French priests. The same year, he also set up a shophouse on the bustling Charoen Krung Road. He was joined in the business by his sons Thongdee, who at age 14 had been sent to apprentice under Benque & Kindermann in Hamburg, Germany, and Sa-at.

Chit died of cholera on 23 May 1891.

== Family ==
Chit had six children, two of whom were sons who joined his studio and inherited the business. Thongdee (Note: ทองดี, RTGS: Thongdi) (c.1860s – 21 October 1895), the elder son, first inherited the business and also became a royal photographer for Chulalongkorn. He received the title Khun Chayasathitsakon (ขุนฉายาสาทิศกร) (Note: Also spelled Khun Chaya Sadis Korn and erroneously as Khun Chaiya.) and received the Dushdi Mala Medal. However, he died a few years after his father, and the business fell to his younger brother Sa-at (สอาด), who would also receive the same title as his brother (later promoted to Phra Chayasathitsakon), as well as the Dushdi Mala Medal. Chit also had at least two other children with other wives.

In Sa-at's time, Chit's descendants were granted the surname Chitragani by King Vajiravudh (Rama VI). The surname is also used posthumously for Chit himself.

== Works and recognition ==
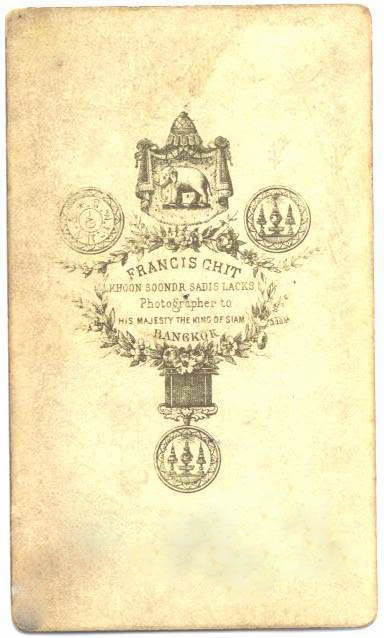
Carte de visite, reverse side showing photographer's mark

Chit's studio produced portraits in carte de visite format, and later also as cabinet cards. Marks from the reverse side of these works indicate that he received the Pushpa Mala Medal, a royal decoration given to craftsmen (later superseded by the Dushdi Mala Medal), as well as a royal warrant allowing him to display the royal arms. The studio, under his sons, also won a bronze medal at the World's Columbian Exposition in 1893.

In addition to portraits, which he produced on commission and had those of royalty and dignitaries for sale, Chit also maintained an inventory of prints of scenic views of palaces, temples and landscapes, though these did not extend beyond the Bangkok region. Chit's work, many of which have been reproduced by and misattributed to European photographers including Wilhelm Burger, John Thomson and W. K. Loftus, constitute the majority of the photographic record of Siam during the second half of the nineteenth century. A catalogue of his works, published in 1878, lists over 9,000 images. Over 2,000 of his original glass plates and large format negatives are preserved at the National Archives of Thailand, donated to the Vajirañāṇa Royal Library by his son Sa-at. They form part of the Royal Photographic Glass Plate Negatives and Original Prints Collection, which was inscribed on the UNESCO Memory of the World Register in 2017.
