= Marzhaye Danesh =

Iranian radio program in UNESCO's Memory of the World program

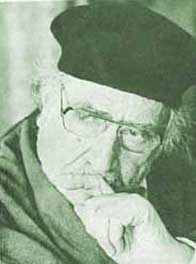
- Mohammad Mohit Tabatabai (fa), writer and director of the radio program Marzhaye Danesh
- Other names: مرزهای دانش
- Genre: popular science
- Country of origin: Iran
- Language(s): Persian
- Home station: Radio Iran
- Written by: Mohammad Mohit Tabatabai
- Directed by: Mohammad Mohit Tabatabai
- Original release: 1959 – 1980

Marzhaye Danesh (Persian: مرزهای دانش), which means "Frontiers of Knowledge" was a radio program that aired on Radio Iran, starting in 1959 under the supervision of Mohammad Mohit Tabatabai (fa). It continued broadcasting until a year after the Iranian Revolution of 1979. The program played a significant role in the dissemination of scientific and cultural knowledge across various social classes in Iran.

== History ==
The program was initiated in 1959 by Mohammad Mohit Tabatabai, a prominent scholar and historian, who also delivered more than 450 lectures on the show. "Marzhaye Danesh" invited renowned academics, researchers, and intellectuals to discuss a variety of scientific, historical, and literary topics. The lectures were presented in a clear and engaging manner, making complex subjects accessible to the general audience. This collection of recorded broadcasts is preserved in the Central Archive of the Islamic Republic of Iran Broadcasting (IRIB). In 2018, the program was included in Iran's National Memory of the World Register, as part of UNESCO's Memory of the World Programme, which aims to protect and promote documentary heritage globally.

== Content and themes ==
"Marzhaye Danesh" covered a diverse range of topics, including but not limited to:

- Historical relations between Iran and China
- The "Mouse and Cat" satire by Obayd Zakani
- Culture and society during the Timurid era
- Teacher training and education
- Elegy poetry in Persian literature
- The Persian language in Turkish schools

Contributors to the program included notable scholars such as Abbas Zaryab and Noushafarin Ansari, among others. Their discussions helped promote academic discourse and broaden public access to scholarly knowledge in Iran.

== Impact and legacy ==
The program was instrumental in fostering a culture of intellectual curiosity and education among Iranian listeners. By offering well-researched yet easily comprehensible content, "Marzhaye Danesh" played a crucial role in spreading awareness of historical, cultural, and scientific advancements. Its inclusion in UNESCO's Memory of the World Programme highlights its historical and cultural significance.
