= Fiji Library Association =

Professional library organization in Fiji

The Fiji Library Association (FLA) is a cooperative professional organization of librarians in Fiji. Founded in 1972, the association supports library education and career development in Fiji and the wider region. Fijian library and information workers of all types are eligible to join, as well as organizations and individuals based in other countries.

== History ==
The FLA was established in 1972 in Suva. It receives regional support and collaboration from other library associations in the Pacific region, as well as the International Federation of Library Associations (IFLA).

The FLA coordinates the sharing of resources, subscriptions, and items to many different library networks and branches in and around Fiji. These may be virtual over social media, or physical items sent directly to an institution. The FLA works to promote professional development opportunities for its members.

A past partner organization of the FLA was the Commonwealth Library Association.

=== Presidents ===
- Lorin Pai (2025)
- Ela Volatabu Qica (2020)
- Francis Ali (2010)
- Salim Baksh (1972)

== Programs and initiatives ==
The Fiji Library Association journal is published in collaboration with the National Library of Australia. It began circulation in 1979 and served as a way to support and promote academic and professional librarians in the Pacific-Oceania regions throughout the 80s and 90s.

== See also ==
- Fiji Library Consortium
- Library Services of Fiji
- National Archives of Fiji
