= Wilhelm J. Burger =

Austrian photographer and painter

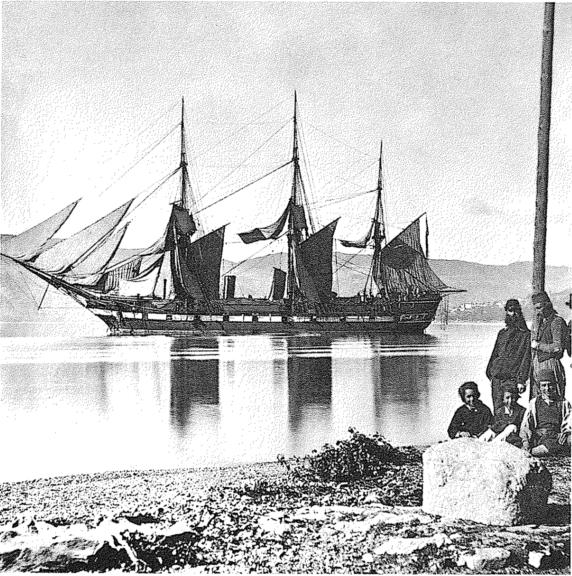
SMS Erzherzog Friedrich (1868)

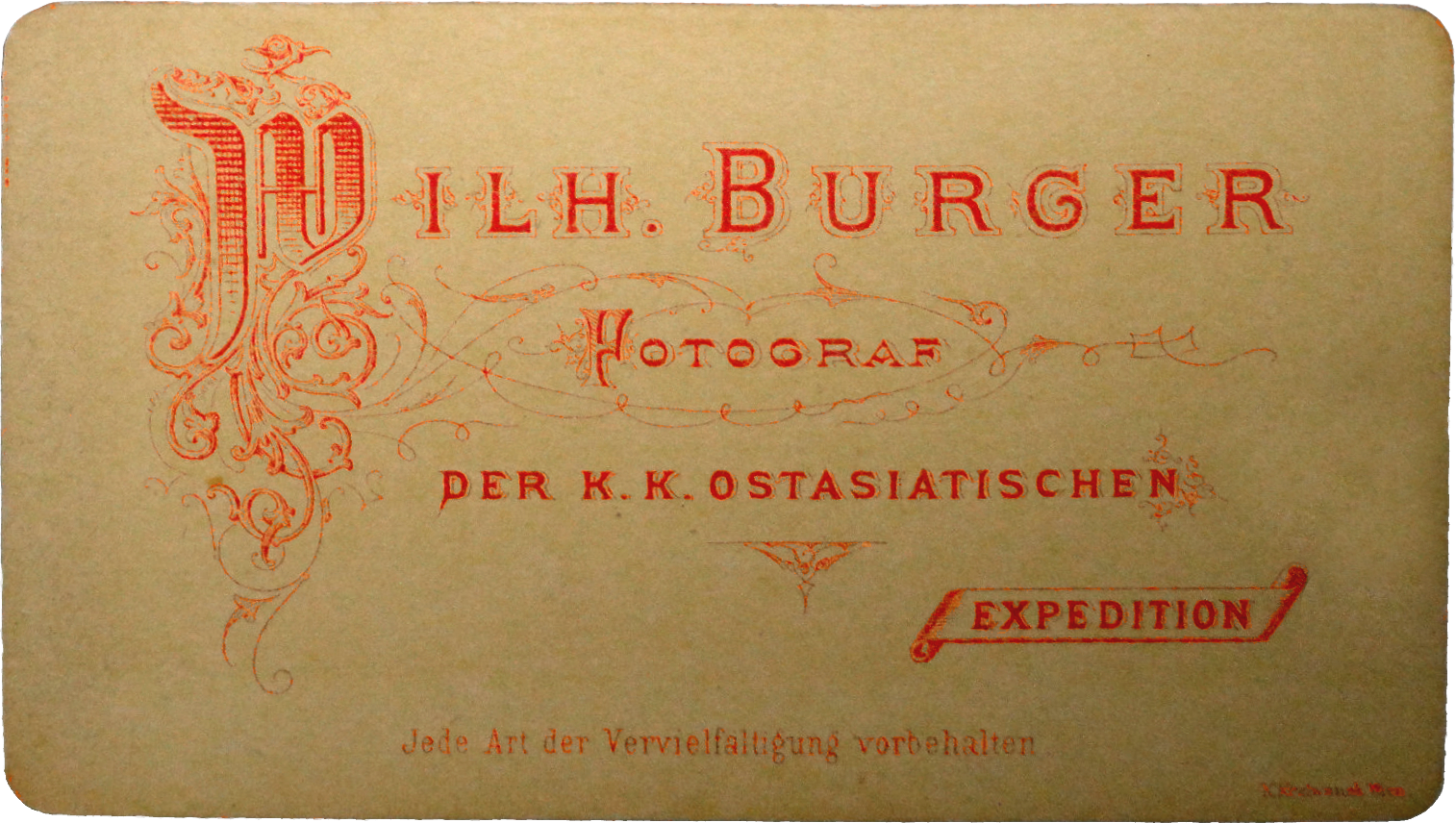
Carte de visite verso

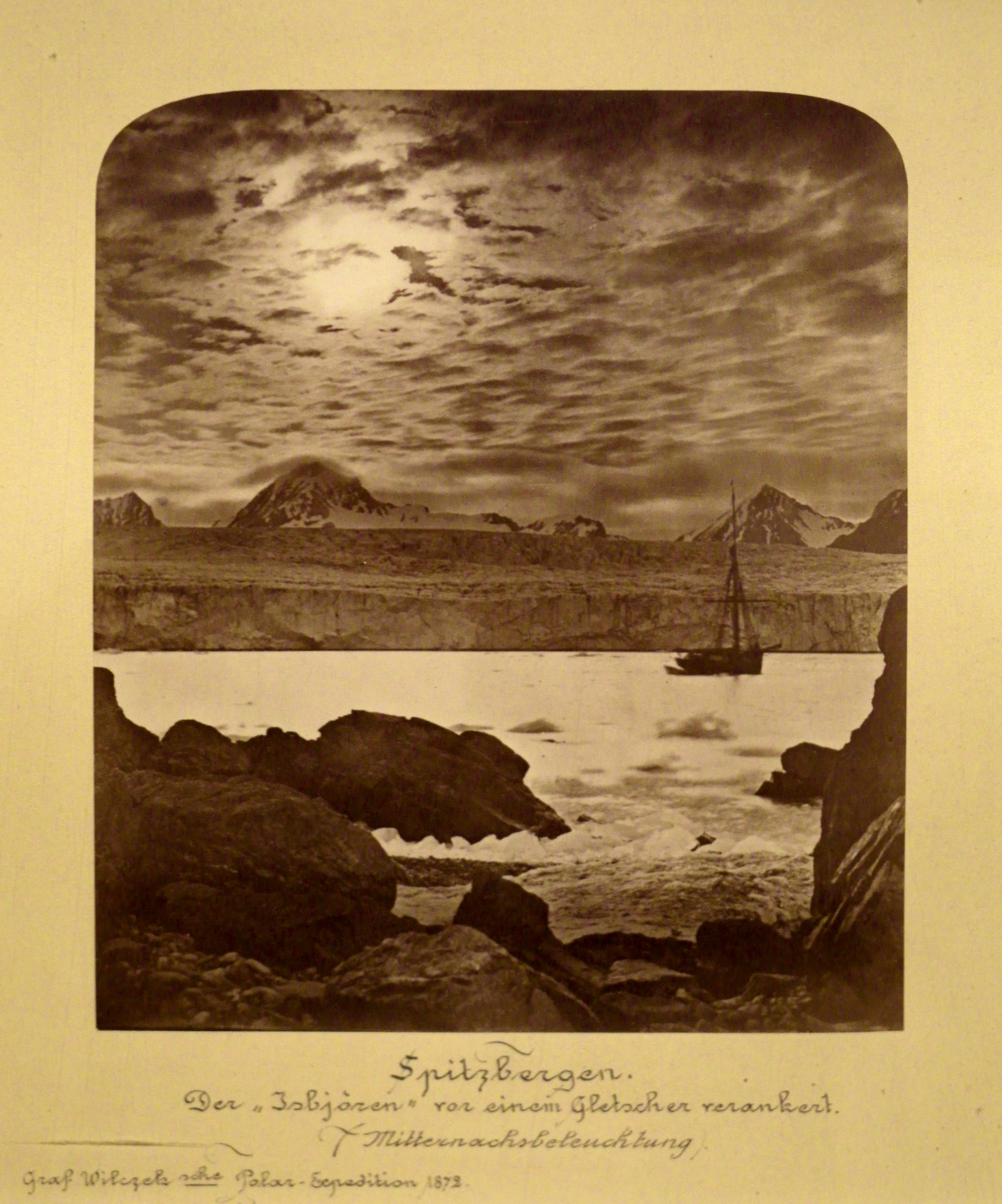
View of Spitsbergen, by Burger, 1872

Wilhelm Joseph Burger (15 March 1844 – 7 March 1920) was an Austrian photographer and painter, based in Vienna. Around the 1870s, he traveled to Thailand and Japan, as well as the Arctic, where he took photographs that have become historical documents and are kept in international archives.

== Biography ==
Burger learned photography from his uncle Andreas von Ettingshausen (1796–1878) in the 1860s. In 1874, Burger operated a photographic studio in Vienna. When working in French, Burger used the first initial "G.", obviously for "Guillaume". As part of an Austro-Hungarian expedition to Japan led by Karl von Scherzer, he took photographs in this country around 1869, and in 1872, accompanied the Wilczek expedition, a preparatory endeavour for the Payer-Weyprecht polar expedition.

A fairly recent discovery has been made of photographs of Siam (Thailand) that were originally attributed to Wilhelm Burger (published in book form by Mr. Pipat Pongrapeeporn, 2001). These photographs, that had been found in Europe in a private collection, were compared to photographs of the same era taken by the Thai court photographer Khun Sunthornsathitsalak (Christian name: Francis Chit). When these photos were lined up side-by-side, it was discovered that what many had considered as individual photographs, taken by two different photographers, were actually part of a set meant to be combined to form a panoramic view.

The complete set of photographs, now correctly attributed to Francis Chit, was returned to Thailand and is now illuminating a new generation of Thai and Western students, historians, and everyday people as to what Bangkok of the 1860s looked like.

In a book on Austrian naval visits in Siam (Auf den Spuren von Österreichs Marine in Siam), first published in 2012 (extended new edition 2022), the author W. Donko concludes that not only these pictures, but a substantial part of the 1869 Siam photo collection attributed to Wilhelm Burger was in fact taken by the court photographer of the King of Siam, Francis Chit. However, the diary of his assistant Michael Moser, published in 2019, proves that some of the photos were taken together with Francis Chit (quote from May 16, 1969: "We were three photographers: namely a native Siamese who does beautiful things and is also on the river. His name is Francis Chit. My master bought very nice matrices from him. The other photographer is a prince - the king's stepbrother.") in 2011, T. Akiyoshi and P. Pantzer showed in an article published in the magazine "Photo Researcher Nr. 15/2011“ that Burger had also bought most of his 1869 photographs of Japan from local photo studios there. The background of Burgers’ 1869 photographs taken in China has not yet been analyzed in this regard.

== See also ==
- History of photography 1850-1900
- Baron Raimund von Stillfried
