= Fine Arts Department =

Department of the Thai Ministry of Culture

- กรมศิลปากร
- Seal of Ganesh, patron of arts

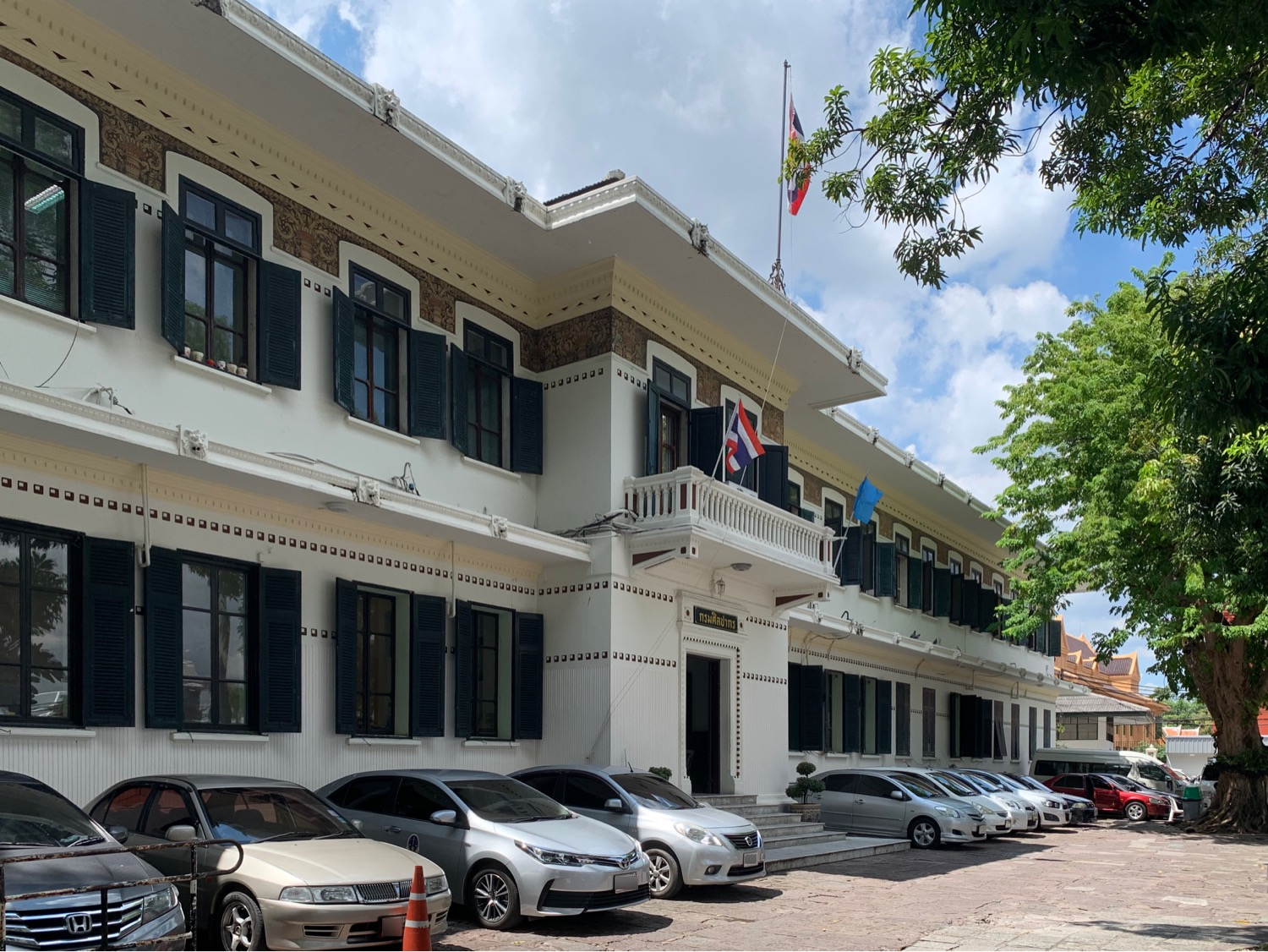
- Old headquarters building at Na Phra That Rd.

Agency overview
- Formed: 1912
- Type: Government agency
- Jurisdiction: Government of Thailand
- Headquarters: Dusit, Bangkok
- Annual budget: 3,070.1 million baht (FY2019)
- Minister responsible: Itthiphol Khunpluem, Minister of Culture
- Agency executive: Phanombut Chantarachot, Director
- Parent agency: Ministry of Culture
- Website: www.finearts.go.th

The Fine Arts Department (Thai: กรมศิลปากร, RTGS: Krom Sinlapakon) is a government department of Thailand, under the Ministry of Culture. Its mission is managing the country's cultural heritage.

== History ==
The department was originally established by King Vajiravudh in 1912, split off from the Palace's Religious Affairs Office, and was primarily concerned with protecting Buddhist monuments. In 1926, during the reign of King Prajadhipok, the department was merged into the Royal Society, along with the Museum Department and Archaeology Department, in effect consolidating several cultural heritage-related agencies. In 1933, following the abolition of absolute monarchy, the Royal Society's archaeological arm was split off and re-established as the Fine Arts Department under the Ministry of Education (then known as the Ministry of Public Instruction). It became part of the Ministry of Culture from 1952 until 1957 (when the ministry was dissolved), and again in 2002 when the ministry was re-established.

== Functions ==
The Fine Arts Department is responsible for the study and management of archaeological sites and objects, as well as the operation of the country's national museums, which it does under the legal framework of the Act on Ancient Monuments, Antiques, Objects of Art and National Museums, B.E. 2504 (1961). It also covers intangible cultural heritage, literature, and historical archives. Among its constituent bureaus are the National Archives and the National Library. Its budget for FY2019 is 3,070.1 million baht.

== Organization ==
The Fine Arts Department is composed of the following divisions:

- Office of the Secretariat
- Archaeology Division
- Underwater Archaeology Division
- Center for Information Technology on Art and Culture
- Office of Performing Arts
- Office of Traditional Arts
- Office of National Museums
- Office of Literature and History
- Office of Architecture
- Office of the National Archives
- Office of the National Library
- Twelve Regional Offices
