= Royal Photographic Glass Plate Negatives and Original Prints Collection =

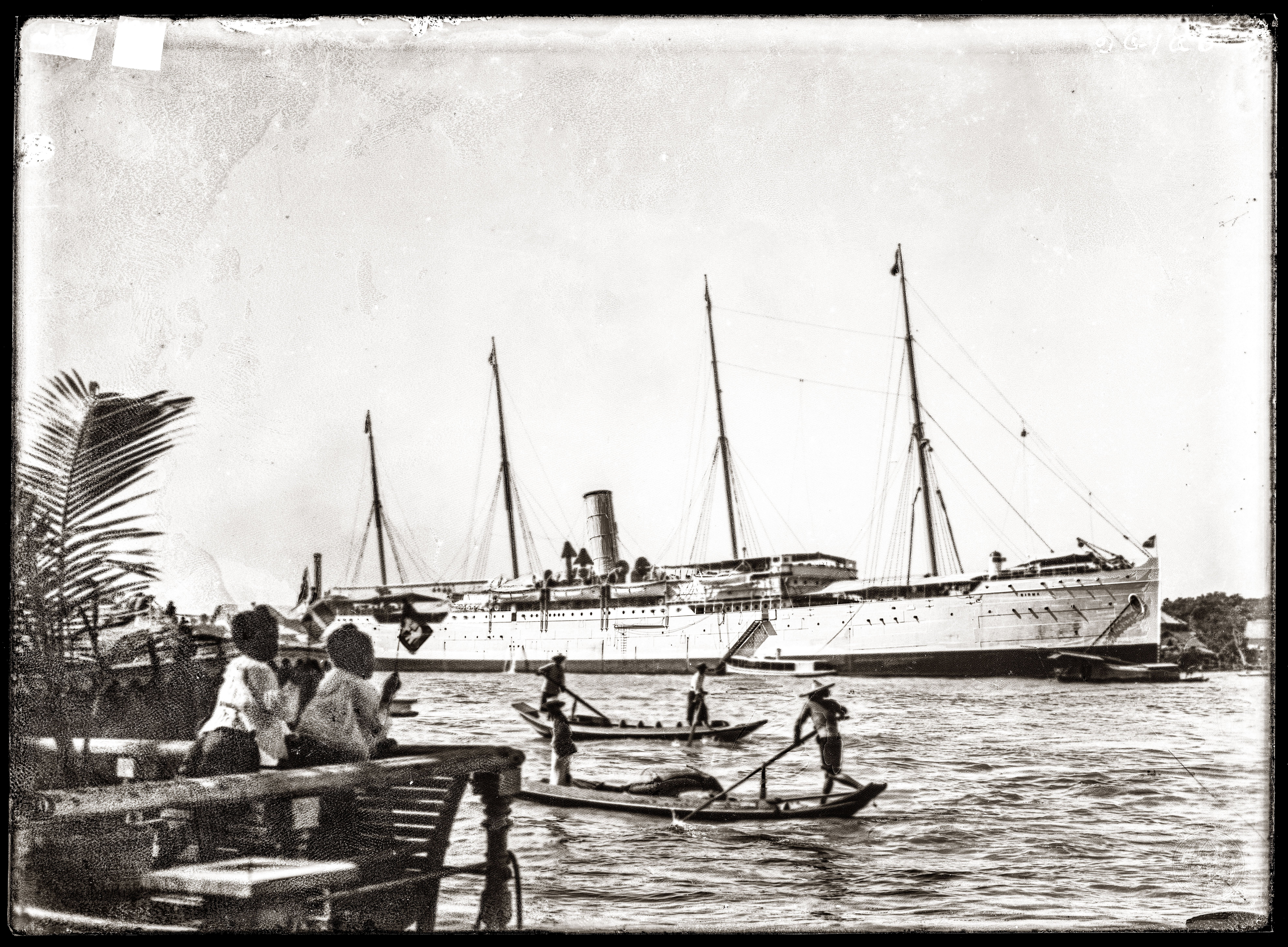
SS Birma, an East Asiatic Company steamboat, photograph ID 07-18 from the collection

The Royal Photographic Glass Plate Negatives and Original Prints Collection, or the Vajirañāṇa Royal Library Collection (Thai: ฟิล์มกระจกและภาพต้นฉบับชุดหอพระสมุดวชิรญาณ) is a large collection of photographic originals from Thailand during the second half of the 19th century to the early 20th century, held since 1977 by the National Archives of Thailand. They were originally acquired by Prince Damrong Rajanubhab, who gathered originals from the personal collections of kings Chulalongkorn and Vajiravudh, his own collection, as well as several photography studios, at the Vajirañāṇa Royal Library, which he headed. The collection comprises 35,427 glass plates, ranging in size from 4 to 12 inches (100 to 300 mm), as well as almost 50,000 prints, and forms a detailed photographic record of Thailand (then known as Siam) during the country's period of modernization. The collection was inscribed by UNESCO on the Memory of the World International Register in 2017.
