= Gilgit manuscripts =

The Gilgit manuscripts are a corpus of manuscripts discovered in 1931 in Gilgit, and contain numerous Buddhist texts, including four sutras from the Buddhist canon, most notably the Lotus Sutra. The manuscripts were written on birch bark in the Buddhist form of Sanskrit in the Sharada script. They cover a wide range of themes such as iconometry, folk tales, philosophy, medicine, and several related areas of life and general knowledge.

The Gilgit manuscripts are included in the UNESCO Memory of the World international register. They are among the oldest manuscripts in the world, and the oldest manuscript collection surviving in Pakistan, having major significance in Buddhist studies and the evolution of Asian and Sanskrit literature. The manuscripts are believed to have been written in the 5th to 6th centuries AD, though more manuscripts were discovered from the succeeding centuries, which were also classified as Gilgit manuscripts.

Gilgit manuscripts
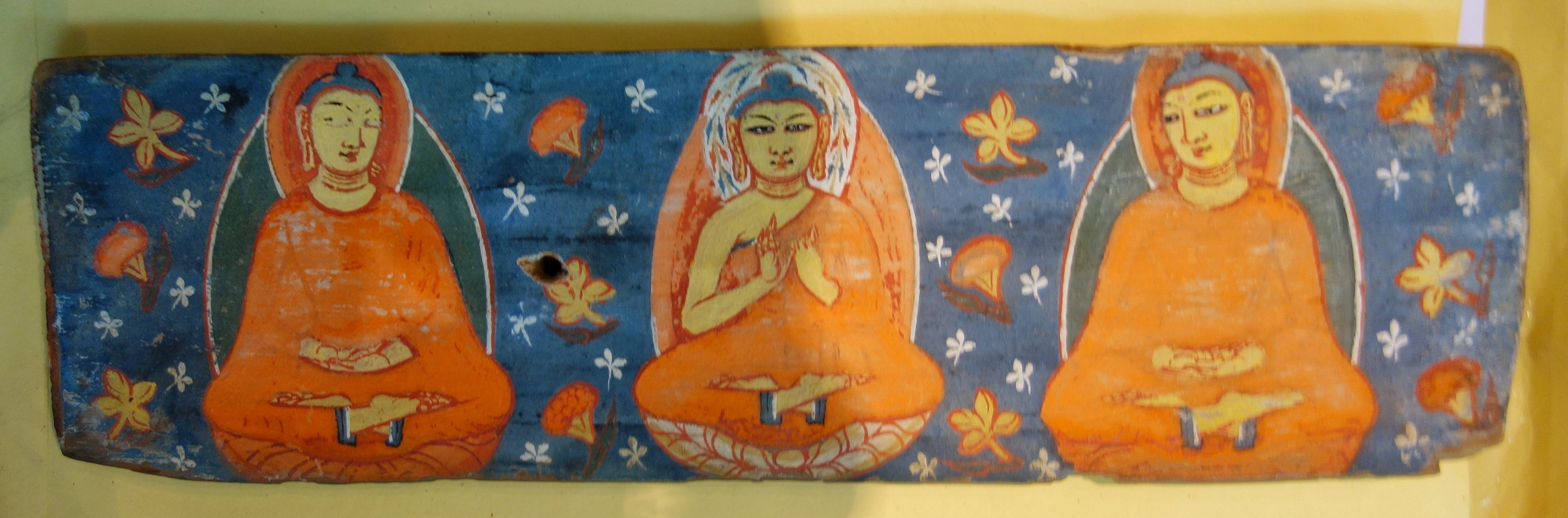
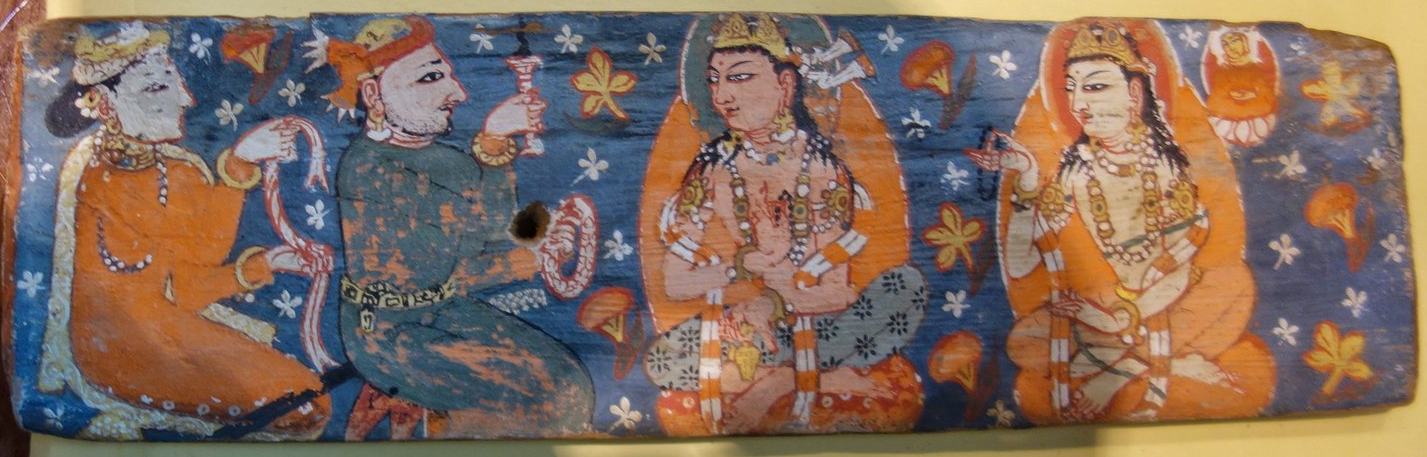
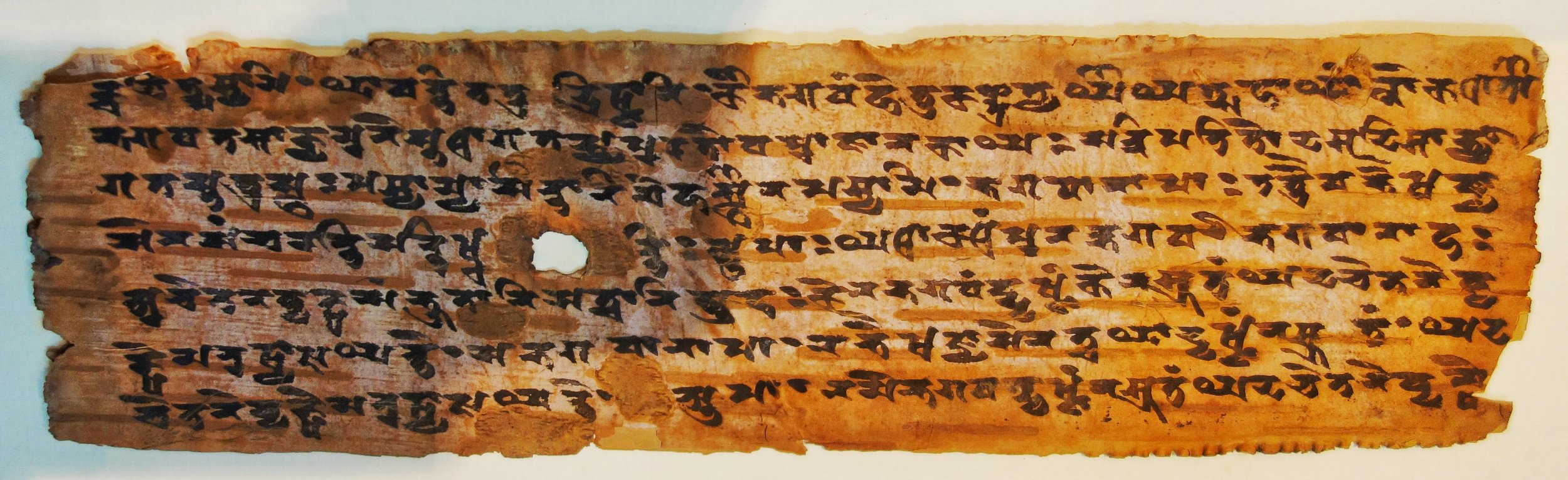
Buddhas, devotees with Buddhist deities on the painted cover from Manuscript 3, Saṃghāṭa Sūtra, with a sample page, commissioned by Devaśirikā and Atthocasiṃgha, 627-628 CE. Gilgit.

Many of the original manuscripts from Gilgit can be found in the National Archives of India and the Pratap Singh Museum in Srinagar. Two manuscripts collected by the orientalist Sir Aurel Stein are in the British Library in London. They include a rare paper version of the Lotus Sutra.

As of 6 October 2014, one source claims that the part of the collection deposited at the Sri Pratap Singh Museum in Srinagar was irrecoverably destroyed during the 2014 India–Pakistan floods.

== See also ==
- Gandharan manuscripts
- Memory of the World Register in Asia and the Pacific
