= Collection of selected maps of Iran in the Qajar Era =

UNESCO Memory of the World Collection

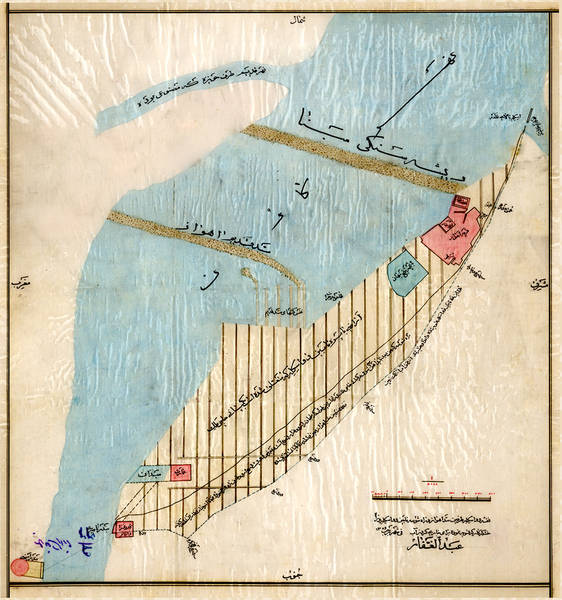
Qajar Era map of Iran

The Collection of selected maps of Iran in the Qajar Era is a historical archive housed at the Center for Documents and Diplomatic History of the Ministry of Foreign Affairs of Iran. This collection comprises approximately 500 hand-drawn or lithographic maps from the Qajar era (1789–1925), preserving the cartographic and geopolitical landscape of Iran during that time.

== Content and significance ==
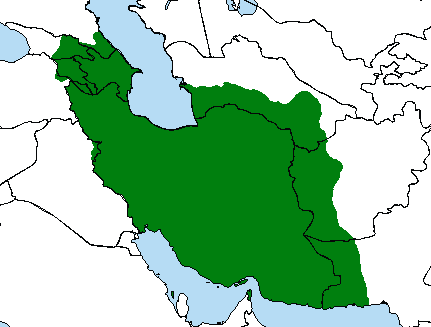
Greatest extent of Qajar Iran

The maps in this collection use measurement units common in that era, such as zar (a traditional Persian cubit) and farsang (a Persian league, roughly equal to 6.24 kilometres (3.88 miles)). They cover a diverse range of subjects, including:

- Maps of cities, villages, and settlements across Iran;
- Water resources and traditional methods of water transportation;
- Borderlines and territorial divisions;
- Various regions of Iran, some of which were later renamed or separated due to political changes.

Due to their historical significance, these maps support the study of Iran's social, political, legal, and geographical transformations. They also show Iran's regional influence and territorial changes over time.

== Recognition ==
In 2013, the collection was added by UNESCO to its Memory of the World International Register, recognizing it as documentary heritage of global importance.

== Preservation and research ==
The maps are preserved under the supervision of the Ministry of Foreign Affairs, with ongoing efforts to digitize and catalog them for academic and research purposes. Scholars from various fields, including history, geography, and political science, frequently use the collection to analyze historical shifts in Iran's borders and urban development.

== Related collections ==
Similar historical cartographic archives exist in the National Library and Archives of Iran and internationally.

== See also ==
- List of Memory of the World Register in Iran
