= Stone stele records of imperial examinations of the Lê and Mạc dynasties =

Stone stelae at the Temple of Literature, Hanoi

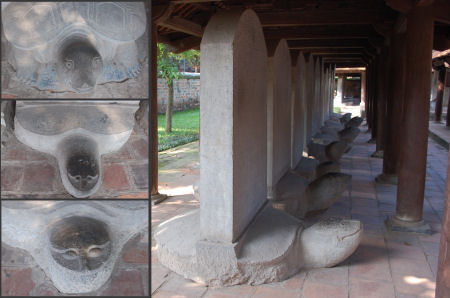
Different types of turtles of the collection.

Stone stele records of imperial examinations of the Lê and Mạc dynasties (Vietnamese: Bia đá các khoa thi tiến sĩ triều Lê và Mạc) is a collection of 82 stone stelae that contain the names and related information of doctoral laureates who passed the imperial examinations during the reign of the Lê and Mạc dynasties from 1442 to 1779. Preserved in good condition in the Temple of Literature of Hanoi, Vietnam, the collection became an inscription of the UNESCO's Memory of the World Programme on March 9, 2010.

== Description ==
The 82 stelae were made from stone in the form of tortoise-mounted tablet since tortoise was traditionally considered a symbol of longevity and everlastingness in Vietnamese culture. There are three principal types of stele corresponding with three different periods of the Lê and Mạc dynasties, besides each stele was decorated with diverse patterns from Taoist-influenced design to everyday images such as farmer or animals. According to the researcher Nguyễn Vinh Phúc, there is possibly an 83rd stele in the collection since people discovered a stone tortoise at the bottom of the lake in the Temple of Literature.

After each examination, a new stele was erected with detailed information about the process of the examination, number of participants and profiles of all laureates. Besides, engraved in each stele is a statement describing the meaning of education and talent for the country and reflecting the Confucian philosophy and tradition of Vietnam. This public recognition of the achievements of the laureates was meant to encourage other students to serve the society in similar manner. One of the most cited statements is the engraving of the first stele which was redacted by Thân Nhân Trung in 1484 for the 1442 imperial examination during the reign of Lê Thái Tông:

— Excellent talents with good virtue are the sap of the country. If the sap is strong, the country will be strong and progress. If the sap is weak, the country will weaken and degrade. For that reason, there is no clear-sighted king who is not concerned about building and developing talent.

== History ==
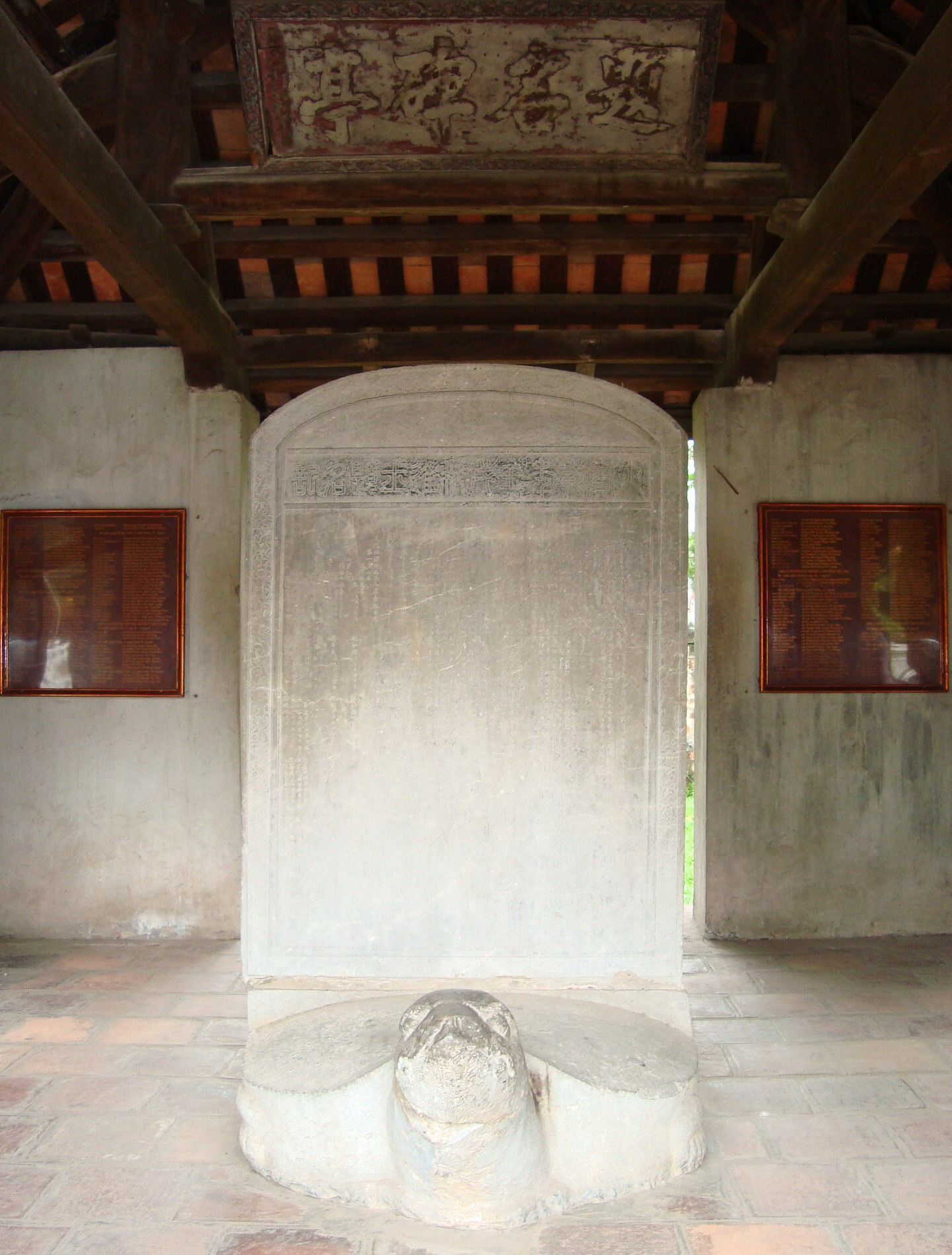
The first stele of the collection.

In total, there are 2,313 names of laureates that were carved in the stelae, they were recognized after passing imperial examination between 1484 and 1780 organized by the Lê, Mạc, Trịnh and Nguyễn dynasties. The first one was erected in 1484 during the reign of Lê Thánh Tông with the record of the 1442 imperial examination while the last stele was made in 1780 for the 1779 examination. Among the names engraved in the collection are many well-known figures in the history of Vietnam such as the historian Ngô Sĩ Liên, the scholar Lê Quý Đôn or the diplomat Ngô Thì Nhậm. Some of those names during the period of Trịnh lords were afterwards crossed out by orders of the Nguyễn emperors since the laureates had participated in activities considered against the Nguyễn lords. Since the stelae were partly damaged during the war between the Tây Sơn dynasty and the troops of Nguyễn Ánh, the emperor Nguyễn Quang Toản wanted to restore the collection but could not complete the work because of the collapse of the Tây Sơn dynasty in 1802. After the establishment of the Nguyễn dynasty, the emperor Gia Long decided to transfer the capital from Hanoi to Huế, thus a new Temple of Literature was built in Huế where new stelae were placed. The total number of stelae in Huế is 32 with the last one dated in 1919.

The collection is appreciated as a national treasure of Vietnam because it provides not only information about the education during 300 years of dynastic Vietnam but also the details about the system of imperial examinations of the past dynasties.

== Memory of the World ==
Initially, the Vietnamese nominations in 2007 and 2008 for the Memory of the World Programme were the Woodblocks of the Nguyễn Dynasty and a collection of old photographs of Indochina. While the former was quickly registered by UNESCO in 2009, the latter was finally replaced by the collection of stone stelae of the Lê and Mạc dynasties which was considered more original and intact. This nomination was ultimately accepted by UNESCO at its meeting in Macau on March 9, 2010 and thus the collection of stele records became the second entry of Vietnam in the list of the Memory of the World.
