= Woodblocks of the Nguyễn Dynasty =

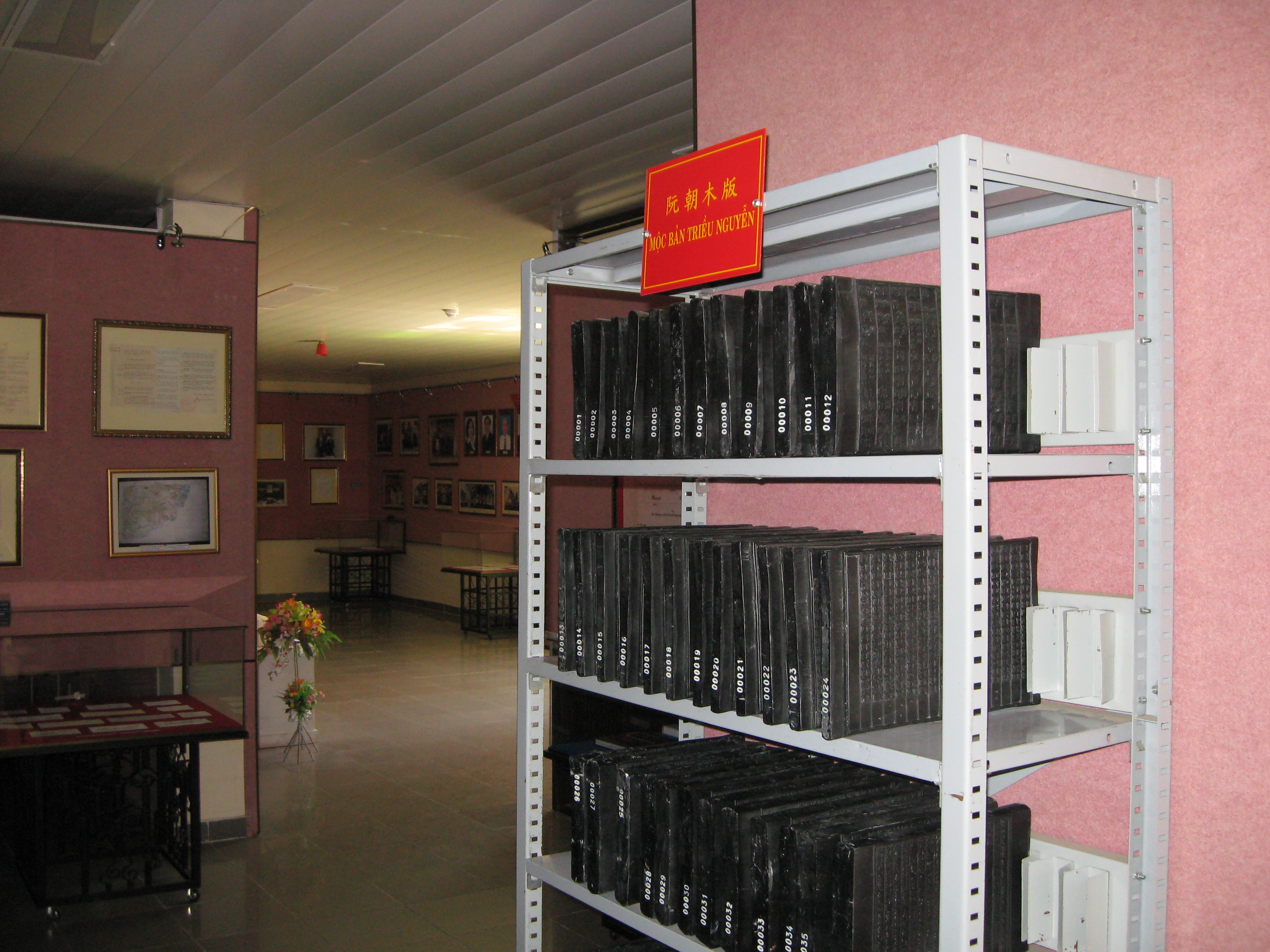
Woodblocks of the Nguyễn dynasty at the Vietnam National Archives Center IV

Woodblocks of the Nguyễn Dynasty (Vietnamese: Mộc bản triều Nguyễn) is a collection of 34,555 plates of woodblock made during the reign of the Nguyễn dynasty in which engraved various contents from official literature, history to classic and historical books. In 2009, this collection became the first entry of Vietnam in the international register of UNESCO's Memory of the World Programme.

== Description ==
The total number of woodblock plates in the collection is 34,555 in which engraved various contents such as official literature, history as well as classic and historical books.

== Memory of the World ==
The collection of woodblocks of the Nguyễn dynasty was the first submission by Vietnam to the Memory of the World Programme in 2008 and was officially registered in 2009, thus became the first Vietnamese entry. According to UNESCO, the collection possesses not only historical value about feudal dynasties in the history of Vietnam but also artistic and technical merit because from those plates, one can learn about the development of woodblock carving and printing profession in this country.

== See also ==
- Stone stele records of imperial examinations of the Lê and Mạc dynasties, the second entry of Vietnam in the Programme
