= List of Memory of the World Register in Iran =

The Memory of the World Register in Iran includes 13 registered works. In 2005, Iran participated in the UNESCO Memory of the World Programme for the first time by introducing two works of Shahnameh Baysanghari from Golestan Museum Palace and the endowment letter of Rabe Rashidi from Tabriz Central Library. Iran is one of the leading countries in terms of registration of works, having so far registered 13 works in the international register. It is ranked seventh in the world, and third among Asian countries after Korea and China. A further 67 works are on the waiting list. The Book of Vandidad, part of the Zoroastrian Bible, is one of the works that have been introduced for registration.

In addition to the works from Iran on the international register, there are three works on the UNESCO Memory of the World Committee for Asia and the Pacific (MOWCAP) register, which records documentary heritage of outstanding regional importance.

== List ==
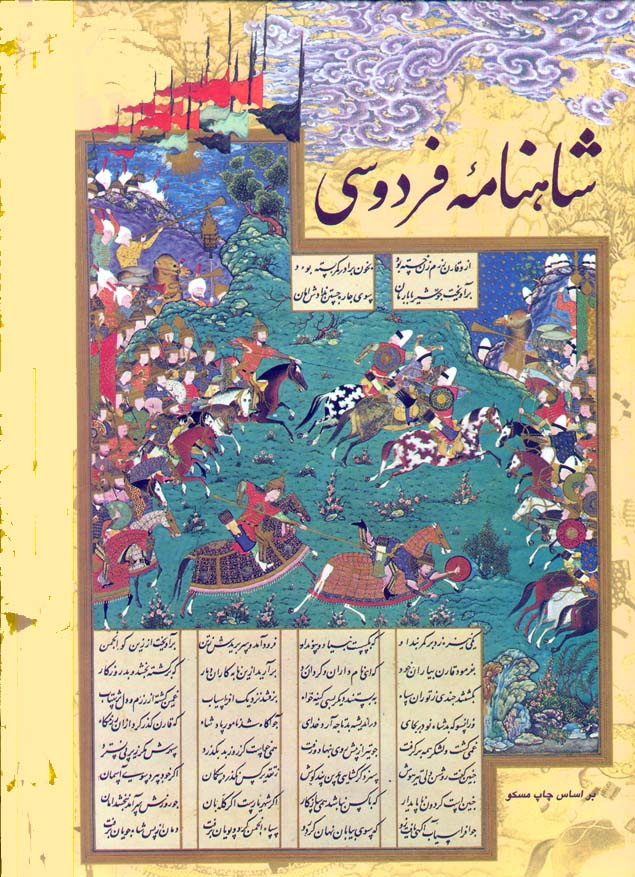
The Shâhnâmeh (Book of Kings) of Iran is one of the classics of the Persian-speaking world, on a par with the Iliad and The Aeneid of the Greco-Roman cultural communities.

Documentary heritage^{[A]}	Country/Territory	Custodian(s), Location(s)	Year inscribed	Reference
"Bayasanghori Shâhnâmeh" (Prince Bayasanghor’s Book of the Kings)	Iran	Golestan Palace, Tehran 35°40′47″N 51°25′14″E	2007	
The Deed For Endowment: Rab’ I-Rashidi (Rab I-Rashidi Endowment) 13th Century manuscript	Iran	Tabriz Central Library, Tabriz 38°03′51″N 46°15′23″E	2007	
Administrative Documents of Astan-e Quds Razavi in the Safavid Era	Iran	Astan-e Quds Razavi Library, Mashhad 36°17′22″N 59°36′58″E	2009	
Al-Tafhim li Awa'il Sana'at al-Tanjim: The Book of Instruction in the Elements of the Art of Astrology	Iran	Library, Museum and Documentation Centre of the Islamic Consultative Assembly, Tehran 35°48′30″N 51°27′31″E	2011	
Collection of Nezami’s Panj Ganj	Iran	Sepahsalar Library (Shahid Mottahri); 35°41′22″N 51°25′52″E: Malek National Library and Museum; 35°41′13″N 51°24′59″E: Golestan Palace, Tehran; 35°40′47″N 51°25′14″E: National Museum of Iran; 35°41′14″N 51°24′53″E: Central Library and document centre of the University of Tehran; 35°42′12″N 51°23′43″E	2011	
A Collection of selected maps of Iran in the Qajar Era (1193–1344 Lunar Calendar / 1779–1926 Gregorian Calendar)	Iran	Library of Political and International Studies of the Iranian Ministry of Foreign Affairs 35°48′30″N 51°27′31″E	2013	
Dhakhīra-yi Khārazmshāhī	Iran	Library of the Sepahsalar Mosque, Tehran 35°41′22″N 51°26′00″E	2013	
Al-Masaalik Wa Al-Mamaalik: The Book of Itineraries and Kingdoms	Germany, Iran	The National Library and Archives of Iran, Tehran; 35°45′07″N 51°26′03″E: The Gotha Research Library, Erfurt; 50°56′43″N 10°42′20″E	2015	
Kulliyyāt-i Saʽdi: Kulliyat of Saadi	Iran	The National Library and Archives of Iran, Tehran 35°45′07″N 51°26′03″E	2015	
Jāme’ al-Tavarikh: Compendium of Chronicles	Iran	Golestan Palace, Tehran 50°56′43″N 10°42′20″E	2017	
