= National Library of Mongolia =

Coordinates: 47.9149°N 106.9162°E

- Монгол Улсын Үндэсний Номын Сан
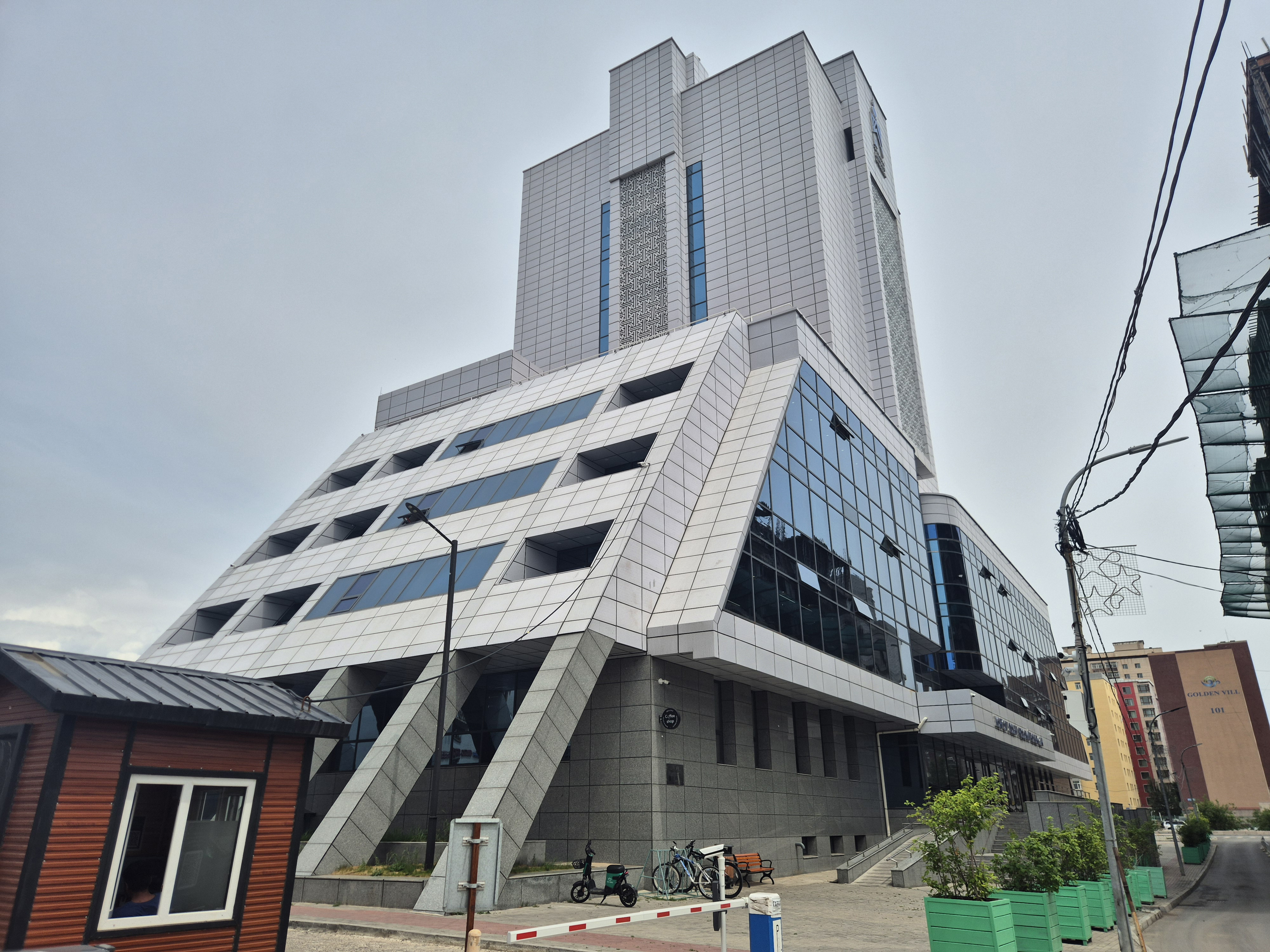
- Location: Sükhbaatar, Ulaanbaatar, Mongolia
- Established: 1921 (105 years ago)

Collection
- Items collected: books, Academic degree dissertations, journals, newspapers, magazines, databases, ancient and modern maps, manuscripts, sutras
- Size: around 3 million

Other information
- Website: www.nationallibrary.mn

Mongolian National Library (Mongolian: Монгол Улсын Үндэсний Номын Сан) located in Sükhbaatar District, Ulaanbaatar, is the largest and oldest library in Mongolia. It houses over three million books and publications, one million of which are rare and valuable books, sutras and manuscripts, including the world's only surviving copies of many ancient Buddhist texts.

== Collections ==
The purpose of the National Library of Mongolia, according to its Rules of Organization and Operation, is “to collect and preserve manuscripts, sutras, academic degree dissertations, as well as books and periodicals that are published in Mongolia and significant foreign books and periodicals; to create a national bibliography; to serve efficiently the library users with the above material and to provide other public libraries with professional methodology, guidance and information.” The National Library of Mongolia is not only the largest library in the country, it is also the Professional Methodological Centre that develops regulations and legal documents to be applied in libraries in the country, develops and publishes professional publications, guidelines and bibliography and provides consultancy to over 1,500 public libraries of the country.

Among the over one million rare and valuable books is a collection of historical materials in Mongolian, Manchu, Tibetan, and Chinese. There are also contemporary collections in German, Japanese, and Korean funded by non-profits from the respective countries in addition to a Soros Foundation funded English education room to help students prepare for language proficiency exams abroad. There is a United Nations depository reading room and ten computers for Internet access. The National Library also has a significant collection of photocopied pictographs and old woodblock printed books.

"Messenger for the People" Mobile Library has opened in 2011 in cooperation with Ministry of Education, Culture and Science, the World Bank and Rural Education and Development Project.

A former branch of the National Library is the Children's Book Palace in Ulaanbaatar. It has an impressive collection of over 100,000 books in Mongolian, English, and Russian, in addition to three reading rooms. The reading rooms have titles like “Big Knowledge Man,” for younger children, “Dream,” for teenagers, and the “Education and Development” room with Internet access. The library has received the support of international organizations such as the Soros Foundation, Asian Development Bank.

== History ==
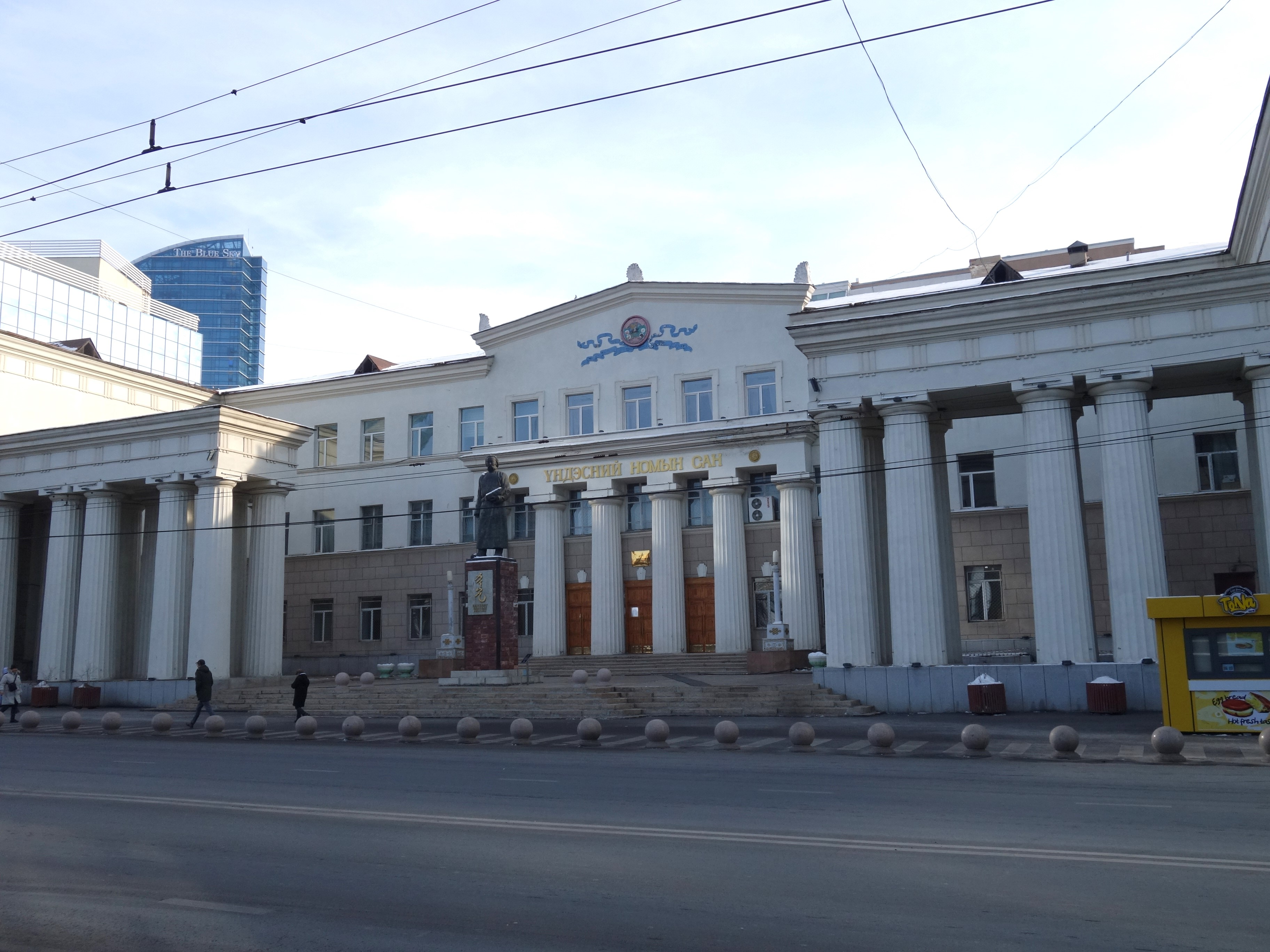
Former building of the National Library of Mongolia

The National Library of Mongolia was officially established on November 19, 1921 under the auspices of the Scientific Committee of Mongolia. The decision was taken at the government's 24th meeting just four months after the Outer Mongolian Revolution of 1921 in July. Originally called the Institute of Sutra and Scripts, its original collection contained a mere 2,000 books all donated by the famed Mongolian scholar Tseven.

According to its charter, the library's objectives included: " Assembly and preservation of manuscripts, sutras, thesis for degrees, as well as books and periodicals that are published in Mongolia, as well as significant foreign books and periodicals, and for the creation of the National Library for effectively provide readers the above materials, and to provide other public libraries of professional methodology, guidance and information." Librarians and scholars were brought in from the Soviet Union to establish the first book exchange with the largest libraries of Moscow and Leningrad in 1924 and Soviet bibliographers initiated the first retrospective compilation "Bibliographical Index of Mongolian books".

The library's first reading room opened on November 24, 1923. Prior to the Second World War, the Mongolian library collaborated solely with Soviet libraries. Starting in the late 1940s they began to interact with the libraries of other countries, first with communist bloc nations such as Hungary (1948), from 1963 - with libraries in Bulgaria (1963). By 1965 the library was collaborating with libraries from 26 countries, using funds of 49 libraries. Today, it has a book exchange program with 100 libraries in 70 countries.

In 1963 the hall of the scientific literature was opened. In order to make the ancient texts of the Mongolian Script and Culture more accessible to foreign as well as domestic researchers, the small museum dedicated to rare and valuable books had been established in 1981. The Library became a member of the International Federation of Library Associations and Institutions (IFLA) in 1991 and currently has book exchange programs with over 100 libraries in 70 countries. In 2005 the library opened a Turkish Reading Room (1600 publications, more than 600 readers per year).

In February 1990 the MPRP Politburo ordered the removal of Josef Stalin's statue from in front of the library in one of its first concessions to pro-democracy demonstrations that would lead to the 1990 Democratic Revolution. In 2004 the writer and journalist Gotovyn Akim was appointed General Director of the library. Based on his recommendation a statue of Byambyn Rinchen, a translator, scientist, linguist and prominent figure of modern Mongolian literature, was erected on the 100th anniversary of his birth in front of the library where the statue of Stalin had stood for nearly 40 years.

The new building of the library was commissioned in 2024 and on the same year, all of the collections from the old building was moved to the new one in April 2024. The books relocation was done by the library's staffs and supervisors.

== Rare and Valuable Books Museum ==
The National Library of Mongolia holds significant Buddhist canonical texts, including the Kanjur (108 volumes) and the Tanjur (226 volumes), which comprise teachings attributed to the Buddha and accompanying commentaries. The Kanjur, meaning "Concise Orders" in Mongolian, includes over 1,260 works from the Indian Tripitaka. The library preserves over ten notable editions of the Kanjur, including manuscript, printed, and uniquely crafted versions.

== “Messenger for the people” mobile library ==
In 2011, with financial support from the World Bank, the library launched the "Messenger for the People" (Ardyn Elch) program to deliver books to nomadic populations, residents of Ulaanbaatar’s yurt districts, the military, prisoners, people with disabilities, pensioners, and out-of-school children. The National Library currently advises approximately 1,500 libraries across the country and, in the year of the program’s launch, received around 7,000 new publications through allocated funds.
