= The Siam Times =

Defunct newspaper in Bangkok, Thailand

- The Siam Times, November 24, 1864
- Type: Weekly newspaper
- Editor: John Hassett Chandler
- Founded: 28 July 1864
- Language: English
- Ceased publication: December 1865
- Headquarters: Bangkok, Thailand

The Siam Times was the first English-language newspaper ever published in Thailand on 28 July 1864 . It was founded by John Hassett Chandler who was the second consul of the United States of America ever posted to Thailand and a tutor to Prince Chulalongkorn hired by King Mongkut after the English governess Anna Leonowens left her position teaching English to the palace children. The newspaper was discontinued in December 1865.

== See also ==
- Timeline of English-language newspapers published in Thailand
- List of online newspaper archives - Thailand
