= Administrative Documents of Astan Quds Razavi =

Records of an Iranian institution

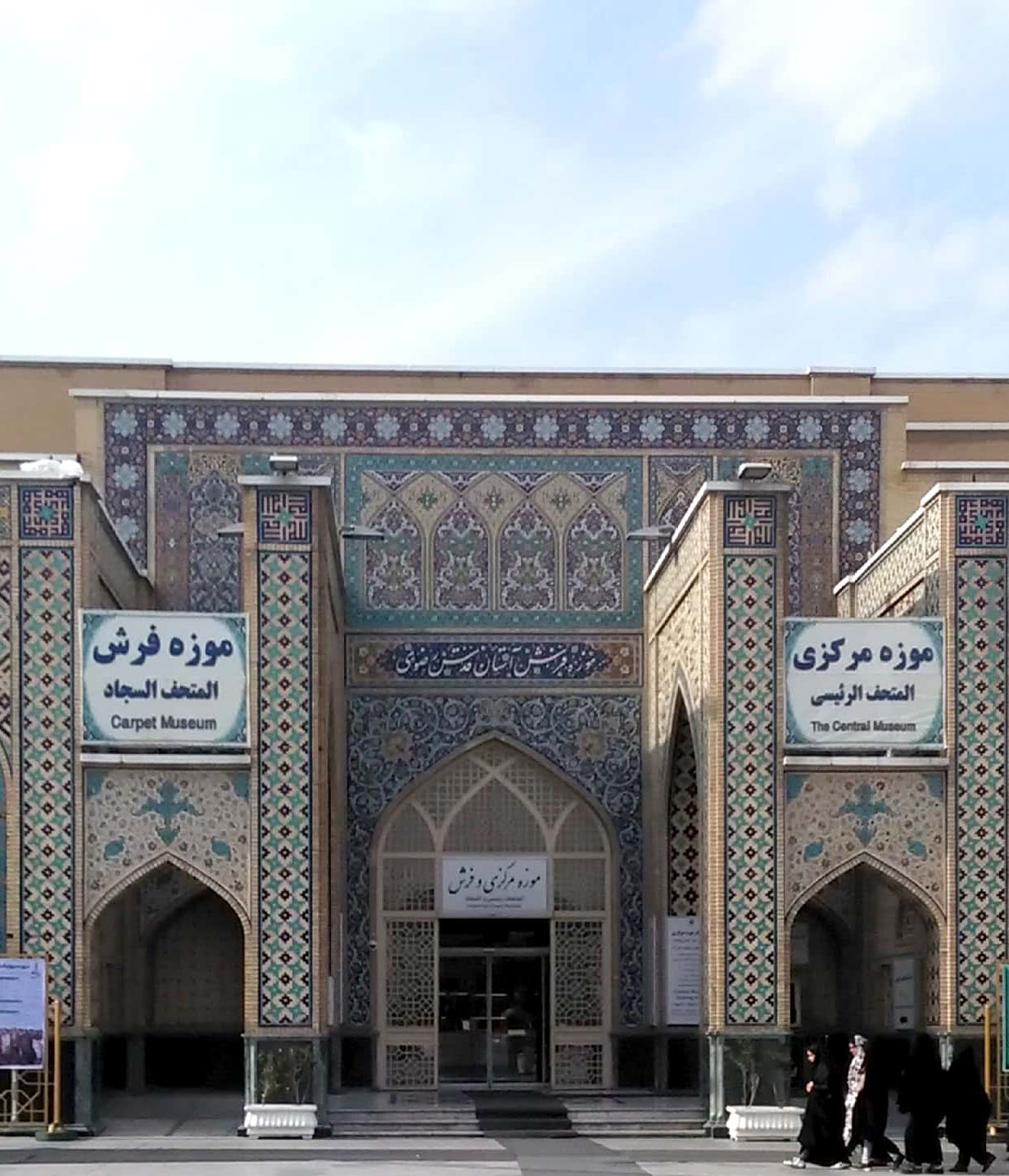
Entrance to the Central Museum of Astan Quds Razavi, Kowsar Courtyard

The Administrative Documents of Astan Quds Razavi comprise a collection of approximately 69,000 pages dating from 1000 AH (1591 AD) to 1148 AH (1735 AD). These documents reflect the extensive administrative structure of Astan Quds Razavi and cover geographical regions of Iran and Afghanistan, particularly Khorasan. The collection is one of the most well-preserved and systematic sets of records from an administrative institution of this period, offering a unique perspective on governance, land management, and religious endowments.

Astan Quds Razavi, a major religious and administrative institution, managed various establishments, including the Imam Reza Shrine, medical facilities (Dar al-Shifa), beverage houses (Sharbat Khana), treasury, religious schools (Madrasas), libraries, and guesthouses.

== Significance and UNESCO recognition ==
The collection is classified into at least five major categories: social, administrative and financial, economic and agricultural, military, and religious.

These records contain details on endowments, donations, property management, tax records, agricultural productivity, trade relations, and the economic infrastructure of Mashhad and the surrounding regions. Additionally, they highlight the role of Astan Quds Razavi in organizing public welfare, education, healthcare, and defense systems.

The documents describe the administrative, social, economic, and agricultural aspects of life in Mashhad and Greater Khorasan during the Safavid period. They illuminate the social history of the time, including the interactions between the ruling elite, religious authorities, and the local population.

The collection was inscribed in UNESCO's Memory of the World International Register in 2009.

== See also ==
- List of Memory of the World Register in Iran
- Astan Quds Razavi Central Museum
