= National Archives of Thailand =

Thai government agency

- สำนักหอจดหมายเหตุแห่งชาติ

Agency overview
- Formed: August 18, 1952
- Headquarters: Dusit, Bangkok; 13.7733°N 100.5045°E
- Employees: ~130
- Agency executive: Nitcha Jariyasettakarn, Director
- Parent department: Fine Arts Department
- Parent agency: Ministry of Culture
- Website: www.nat.go.th

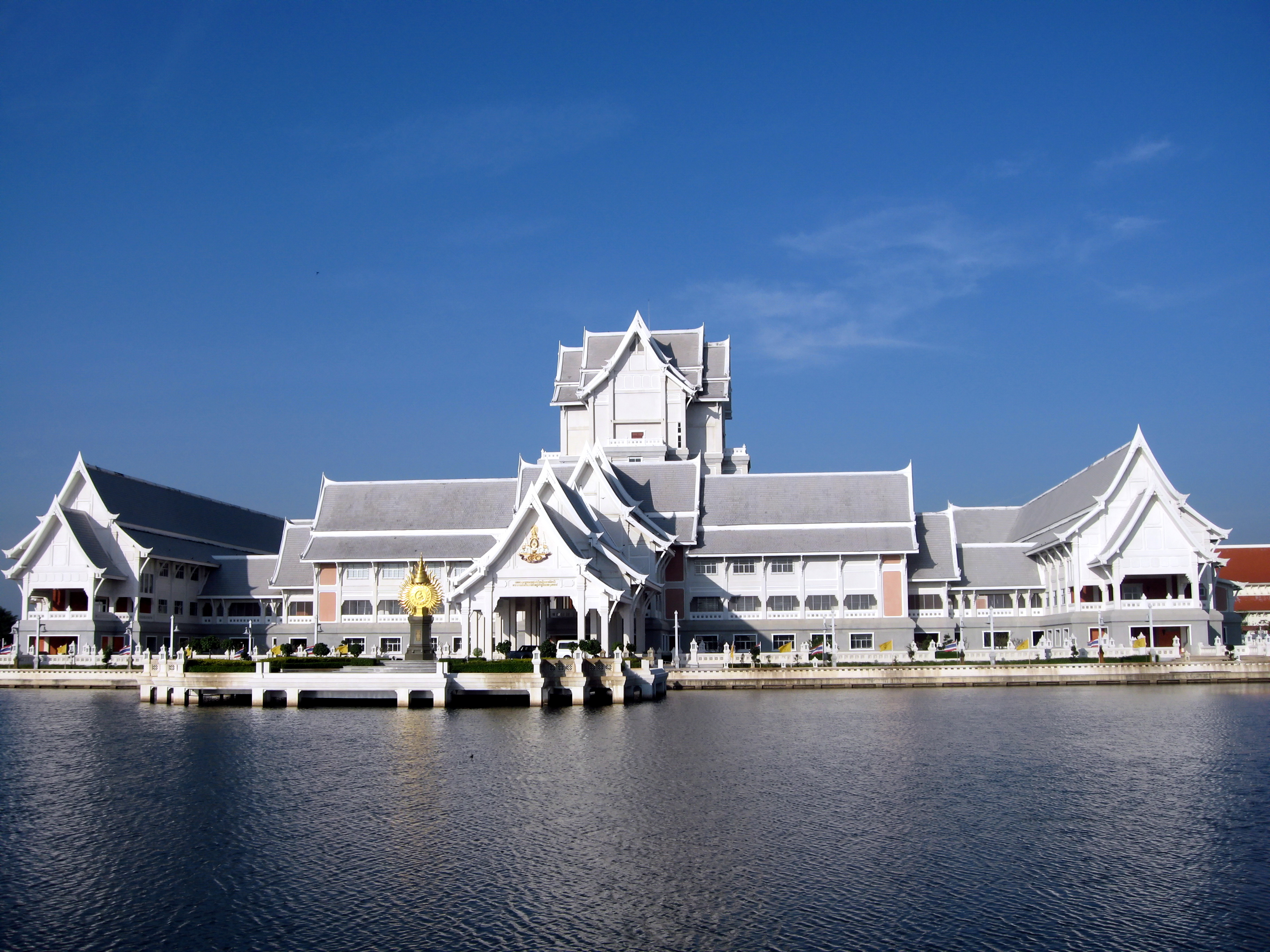
National Archives of Thailand, Pathum Thani Campus (2009)

The National Archives of Thailand (NAT) (Thai: สำนักหอจดหมายเหตุแห่งชาติ; RTGS: samnak ho chot mai het haeng chat ) is a Thai government agency under the Fine Arts Department of the Ministry of Culture. It was established in 1916 (B.E.2459) as a section of the National Library of Thailand. It officially became the National Archives of Thailand on 18 August 1952.

The NAT employs 131 persons and has an annual budget of 80 million baht. It has satellite facilities in Phayao and Ubon Ratchathani Provinces. As of 2018 the NAT Director is Ms Nanthaka Pollachai.

== Mission ==
The National Archives is responsible for collecting and preserving public and other historical records and making them available to the public. It also advises government agencies on records management and records preservation.

As a general rule, government records are transferred to the National Archives when they are 30 years old under the Prime Minister's Regulation on Records Keeping issued in 1983 (B.E.2526 and second and additional version, B.E.2548). The archive collects about seven percent of all government documents (2018). Archivists appraise the records to ascertain which are of historical value for permanent preservation. Records of value donated by individuals interested in their preservation are retained as archival collections.

== Collection ==
The National Archives' collection consists of over one million historical government and public records, including paper and palm leaf documents, photographs, posters, maps, videos tapes, and sound recordings dating from the reign of King Rama IV to the present.

As of 30 September 2011, the National Archives had 10,285 written documents, 24,508 wet plate collodions, 444,009 photos, 808,693 films, 20,062 maps and plans, 2,696 posters, 4,472 calendars, 4,467 audio records, 3,941 visual records, 9,503 microfilms, 734 compact discs, 34 digital visual records, 43,628 bound volumes, government documents and rare books, 1,867 meeting minutes, memos and incident records and 677,269 important news clippings. The oldest document in the collection is a paper document dating to the reign of King Rama IV (1851-1868).

Thailand's archives hold few materials relating to foreign countries. For example, it has no materials about Vietnam, Cambodia, or Laos, but does have a number of Chinese documents. According to Thai culture researcher Phuthorn Bhumadhon, when he wants to search the history of the Ayutthaya period, he has to go to archives in France.

== Researcher access ==
Foreign researchers are permitted to use the archives after completion of a researcher registration form together with a letter of permission obtained from the National Research Council of Thailand.

== See also ==
- List of national archives
