= National Archives of Fiji =

Governmental Agency For Fiji

The National Archives of Fiji (Fijian: Viti ni iTukutuku Maroroi) is a Fijian government agency under the Ministry of Education, Heritage, and Arts. It is the successor of the Central Archives of Fiji and the Western Pacific High Commission, established in 1954. Its name changed to the National Archives of Fiji in 1971, shortly after Fiji's independence. The agency is responsible for archiving records of the Fijian government. The National Archives recently launched a website that makes records available online.

== See also ==
- Fiji Museum
