= National Library of Thailand =

National library

- หอสมุดแห่งชาติ
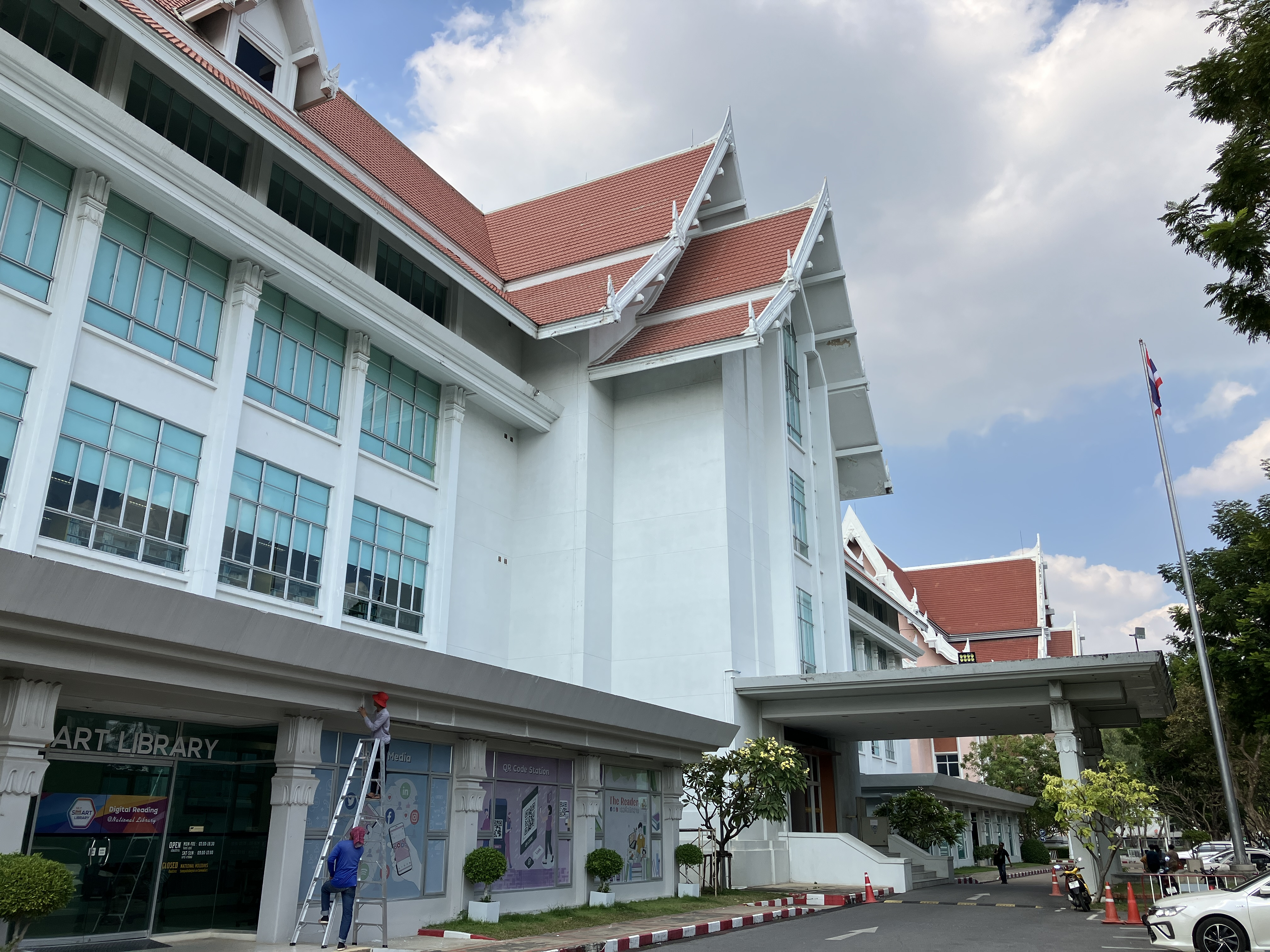
- Main building at Tha Wasukri
- 13.772337°N 100.505094°E
- Location: Bangkok
- Type: National library
- Established: 1905; 120 years ago

Collection
- Size: 5.3M items (2023)

Other information
- Budget: 36,912,200 baht (2023)
- Director: Ms.Vassana Ngamduangchai . (2024)
- Employees: 135 (2023)
- Website: www.nlt.go.th

The National Library of Thailand (Thai: หอสมุดแห่งชาติ, RTGS: Ho Samut Haeng Chat [hɔ̌ː.sà.mùt.hɛ̀ŋ.tɕʰâːt]) is the legal depositary and copyright library for Thailand. It was officially established on 12 October 1905, after the merger of the three existing royal libraries, and is one of the oldest national libraries in Asia. It operates under the jurisdiction of the Fine Arts Department of the Ministry of Culture in Bangkok, Thailand.

For the fiscal year of 2023, the National Library of Thailand had a budget of just under 37 million THB, equivalent to a little over 1 million USD. In this same year, the library employed 135 staff, held over 5 million physical items, and was visited by over 200,000 patrons.

== Background ==
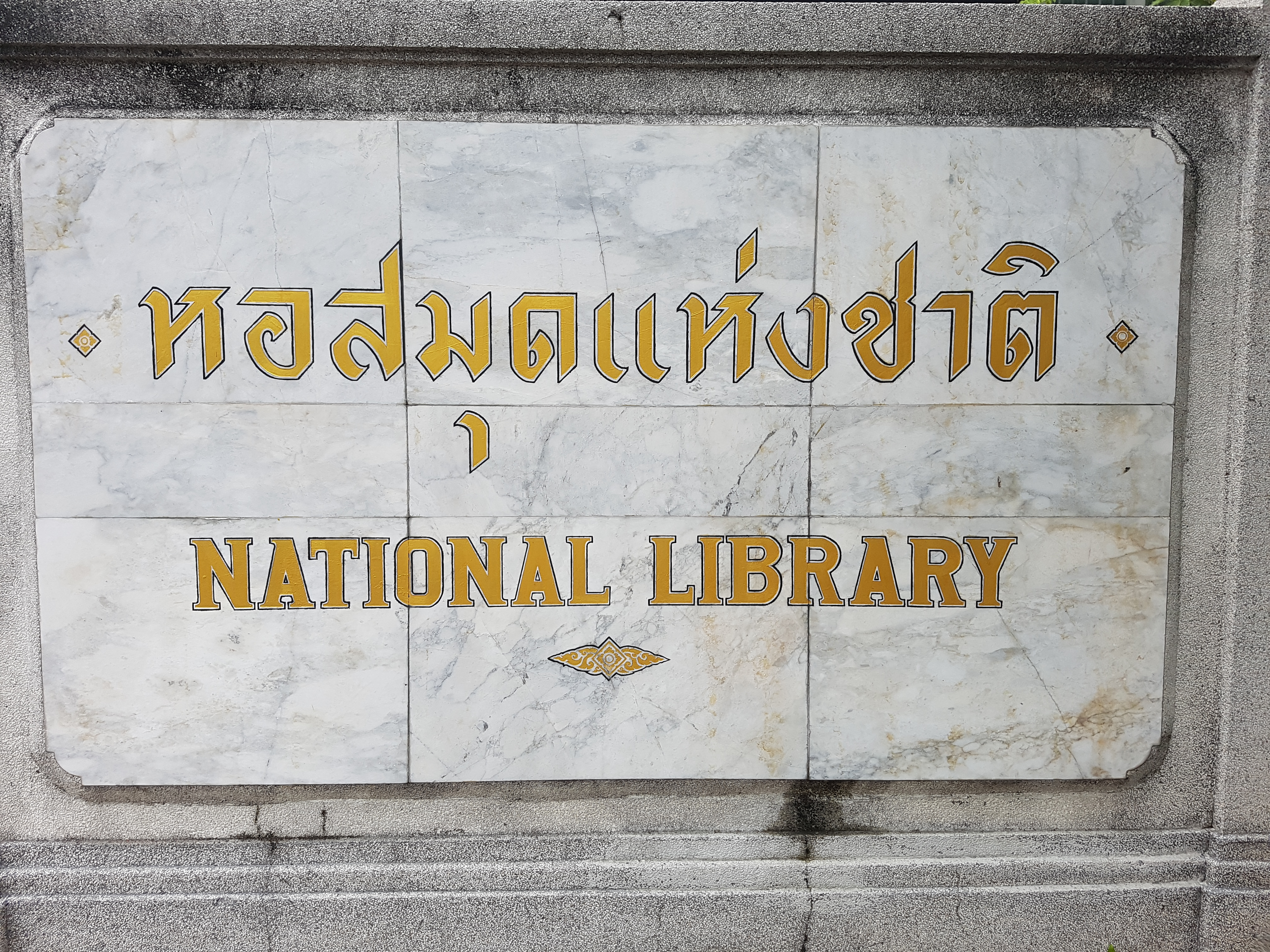
Sign, National Library of Thailand

The National Library of Thailand's main tasks are collecting, storing, preserving, and organizing all national intellectual property regardless of medium. Collections include palm-leaf manuscripts stone inscriptions, Thai traditional books, and printed publications, as well as audio-visual materials and digital resources. The library is a national information resource serving citizens nationwide.

The National Library has a long history. Its precursor was the Phra Vajirayana Royal Library (Thai: หอสมุดพระวชิรญาณ) which was established in the early 1880s, by sons and daughters of King Mongkut (Rama IV) to honor their royal father. In 1889, King Chulalongkorn decided to take over the management of the libraries, but it was only in 1897, when he returned from his European visit that he expressed his desire to dedicate the Vajirayana Library to the Capital. In 1905, three libraries, the Mandira Dharma Library, the Vajirañāṇa Library, and the Buddhassānasañgaha Sangaha Library, were amalgamated at the command of King Chulalongkorn and renamed the "Vajirañāṇa Library for the Capital City", or the State Library. The library has remained under royal patronage since that date.

Before the merging of the royal libraries into the State Library, the general public were usually not allowed to use the library. The libraries were open to members only, who had to be voted in by the library council and paid a monthly membership fee. After the rededication in 1905, the general public were allowed to access materials in the reading rooms, though they still could not check books out for use outside of the library until later in the library's history.

In 1933, after democratic reforms, the Fine Arts Department was established and assumed administration of the Vajirañāṇa Library by royal decree. It was subsequently renamed the "National Library". In 1966, the National Library was relocated to Samsen Road in Bangkok and is now administered by the Ministry of Culture.

== Cultural Heritage ==
The National Library of Thailand is a site for the preservation and stewardship of many types of intellectual property important to the cultural heritage of Thailand. Examples of these pieces of cultural heritage include stone inscriptions, palm leaf manuscripts, paper manuscripts, and other printed Thai materials. Most of the stone inscriptions held by the National Library are stored in warehouses, but some 10,000 transcriptions and rubbings are available in digitized formats. The Library holds around 250,000 palm leaf manuscripts written in various scripts, many of which are written in the Pali language and are versions of Buddhist texts. The paper manuscript collection concerns a wide variety documents mostly secular in nature, including literary, legal texts (Thai: กฎหมาย), and administrative documents.

=== Cremation Volumes ===
In the late 19th century, an important facet of the royal libraries’ Thai book collections that would later become the national library, were cremation volumes. These unique examples of Thai literature, often including reprints of library manuscripts and literary texts, were produced for distribution at funeral events and financed by wealthy individuals as an act of almsgiving. It is estimated that the majority of the Thai books held by the National Library in the early 20th century, were cremation volumes.

=== Palm-Leaf Manuscripts ===
In 2023, the National Library of Thailand's collection of palm-leaf manuscripts recounting the Phra That Phanom Chronicle was officially added to UNESCO's Memory of the World International Register. This collection of manuscripts includes ten versions of the chronicle, which is an important Buddhist text, and useful for comparative studies.

== Outline history ==
Year	Event
1905	Three royal libraries were combined by King Rama V, called the State Library (Hor Phrasamutsamrap Phranakhorn).
1916	The Vajirañāṇa Library for the Capital City was moved to Thavaravathu Building, east of Wat Mahathat.
1925	Printed material collections were housed in the Thavaravathu Building, later renamed "Vajiravudh Library" by King Rama VII. All original ancient manuscripts and Thai gilded bookcases were transferred to Sivamokkabiman Hall and renamed the "Vajirañāṇa Library".
1933	The library was placed under the care of the Fine Arts Department as the "Library Division", and renamed the National Library.
1947	Damrong Rajanubhab Memorial Library was founded and later transferred to a new building in the Varadis Palace compound on Lan Luang Road.
1966	The National Library was moved to Samsen Road.
1972–2009	Establishment of 16 provincial National Library branches
1979	Establishment of the Naradhip Centre for Research in Social Sciences in the Thavaravathu Building
1981	King Vajiravudh Memorial Hall was constructed to house royal private collections and exhibit royal waxworks as well as Dusit Thani Experimental Democratic Cities of King Rama VI.
1990	Opening of King Bhumibol Adulyadej Library Building.
1994	Opening of the Princess Sirindhorn Music Library.
1997	Opening of King Rama IX Music Library.
1999	Opening of Lat Krabang National Library Branch.
2000	King Chulalongkorn Memorial Hall set up as the centre of royal activities information to honor and commemorate royal activities via a permanent exhibition within Thavaravathu Building.
2011	The National Library was moved to a new building in the same general vicinity as the old, and reopened on October 3.
2017	The old building was renovated and reopened for the public on October 17.

== Mission statement ==
1. Collect, catalog, and research national intellectual property.
2. Develop standards for the storage and preservation of national intellectual property.
3. Create and augment the value of national intellectual property.
4. Develop systems for rendering services to the diverse users of the library.
5. Develop systems to manage the nation's intellectual property heritage.

== Library Services ==
The National Library of Thailand has made strides in developing accessible collections and services that meet the information needs of their patrons. As of 2023, the library added a number of new environments and programs to their in-person library services, including co-working spaces, a café, and a theatre where patrons can view classic Thai films from the Film Archive. Another program active as of 2023, was The Reader Project, an initiative to provide library materials by mail to library patrons unable to use the reading rooms in person.

Since 2015, the library has embarked on a major digitization process in order to provide access to a portion of their physical materials for the general public. Much of the materials targeted for digitization include documents, films, and old photographs. In 2023 alone, the library digitized 56,000 items.
