= Nasrallah Hosseini Emami =

Mirza Nasrallah Hosseini Emami
- نصرالله حسینی امامی
- Born: c. 1811; Isfahan, Qajar Iran
- Died: 1876
- Other names: Mirza Nasrallah Emami; Nasrallah Emami Esfahani; Nasrallah Naqqash-bashi
- Known for: Persian lacquer painting, pen-case painting, flower and bird painting, calligraphy
- Movement: Emami school
- Children: Mohammad Hosayni Emami
- Relatives: Mirza Aqa Emami (grandson)

Nasrallah Hosseini Emami (Persian: نصرالله حسینی امامی; c. 1811–1876), also known as Mirza Nasrallah Emami and Nasrallah Emami Esfahani, was an Iranian painter, lacquer artist and calligrapher active during the reign of Naser al-Din Shah Qajar. A member of the Emami family of Isfahan, he was associated with the Emami school of Persian lacquer painting. He received the title of naqqash-bashi, or chief painter, and worked on lacquer pen cases, book covers, mirror cases, floral compositions and paintings of birds.

== Life and family ==
Nasrallah Emami was born in Isfahan around 1226 AH, corresponding approximately to 1811–1812. Little is known about his education or teachers, but his surviving works indicate that he was trained within the workshop traditions of the painters and lacquer artists of Isfahan.

He belonged to the Emami family of Isfahan, several members of which worked as painters, pen-case decorators, book-cover painters and lacquer artists during the nineteenth century. Members of the family used signatures containing the names or epithets Hosseini, Emami and Hosseini Emami. In studies of Persian lacquer painting, some of these artists have collectively been described as belonging to the “Emami school”.

Nasrallah Emami was the father of Mohammad Hosayni Emami, a painter known for flower-and-bird compositions and lacquer objects, and the grandfather of Mirza Aqa Emami. Mirza Aqa Emami later worked in miniature painting, manuscript illumination, lacquer painting, carpet design and the art of leather and paper cutwork, continuing the artistic tradition of the family.

== Title of naqqash-bashi ==
During the reign of Naser al-Din Shah, Emami received the title of naqqash-bashi. The precise date on which the title was granted is unknown, but it appears alongside his name on a work dated 1290 AH, corresponding to 1873–1874. It has therefore been suggested that the title had been granted by either Naser al-Din Shah or Mass'oud Mirza Zell-e Soltan, the governor of Isfahan, by that date.

In Qajar Iran, naqqash-bashi was not necessarily a purely honorary title. It was commonly bestowed upon senior artists who directed a royal or princely painting workshop, or who possessed an equivalent professional status. Depending on the context, a naqqash-bashi could supervise artistic commissions, produce portraits of the shah and members of the court, decorate buildings and manuscripts, and direct other painters.

== Artistic career ==
A significant part of Emami's work consisted of painting lacquered objects made from compressed paper or papier-mâché. He decorated pen cases, mirror cases and book covers with floral compositions and flower-and-bird imagery, and was particularly noted for his representations of birds. Works in opaque watercolour and gold on paper have also been attributed to him.

In his flower-and-bird paintings, flowers and birds were generally rendered with broader brushwork than in some of the more finely detailed examples of Qajar painting. Rather than filling the entire surface with minute ornament, he often emphasised the principal forms, colour relationships and arrangement of the main elements. His work continued traditions of flower-and-bird painting developed during the Zand and Qajar periods.

Emami was also known as a calligrapher and was particularly associated with the shekasteh-nastaʿliq script. Some sources additionally describe him as having written poetry.

== Emami school ==
The term “Emami school” has been used in studies of Persian lacquer painting to describe a group of nineteenth-century artists active in Isfahan. Several of these artists signed their works with the epithets Emami or Hosseini Emami and specialised in the decoration of lacquer pen cases, mirror cases, book covers and related objects. Nasrallah Hosseini Emami, Zayn al-Din Esfahani and Gholam Reza Emami have been identified as notable artists associated with this group.

Although the term derives from the shared name or epithet used by these artists, the exact familial and master-pupil relationships among all members of the group remain incompletely documented. Similarities between their compositions and their use of shared patterns suggest professional connections between their workshops.

== Signatures ==
Emami signed his works in several forms. Signatures recorded on works attributed to him include Nasrallah al-Hosseini al-Emami and raqam-e Nasrallah al-Hosseini al-Emami, meaning “drawn by Nasrallah al-Hosseini al-Emami”. He also used the invocation Ya Aba Abd Allah al-Hossein as a personal inscription or identifying phrase.

The use of the epithet Hosseini and invocations connected with Husayn ibn Ali reflected the artist's religious and family identity and may also assist in distinguishing his work from that of other members of the Emami family.

== Known works ==
Among the works attributed to Emami is a lacquer book cover decorated with flower-and-bird imagery for a manuscript of the collected works of Saadi Shirazi. The cover was reportedly commissioned by Zell-e Soltan and produced around 1875. It has been described as an important example of Emami's lacquer painting and book-cover decoration.

An album page depicting a nightingale perched on a flowering rose branch bears the signature Nasrallah al-Hosseini al-Emami and is dated Muharram 1285 AH, corresponding to 1868. Executed in opaque pigments and gold on paper, it is an example of his independent flower-and-bird painting outside the context of lacquer objects.

Other works attributed to him include lacquer pen cases, mirror cases and painted book covers. His works are dispersed among museum and private collections, and differences in the forms of his signatures have complicated the preparation of a comprehensive catalogue of his work.

== Death and legacy ==
Nasrallah Hosseini Emami died in 1293 AH, corresponding to 1876. His style and workshop traditions were continued by later members of the Emami family. His son, Mohammad Hosayni Emami, and his grandson, Mirza Aqa Emami, both worked in flower-and-bird painting, lacquer painting and related decorative arts, helping to maintain the family's artistic tradition in Isfahan.
