= Young Woman with a Fan =

1590-1600 painting by Reza Abbasi

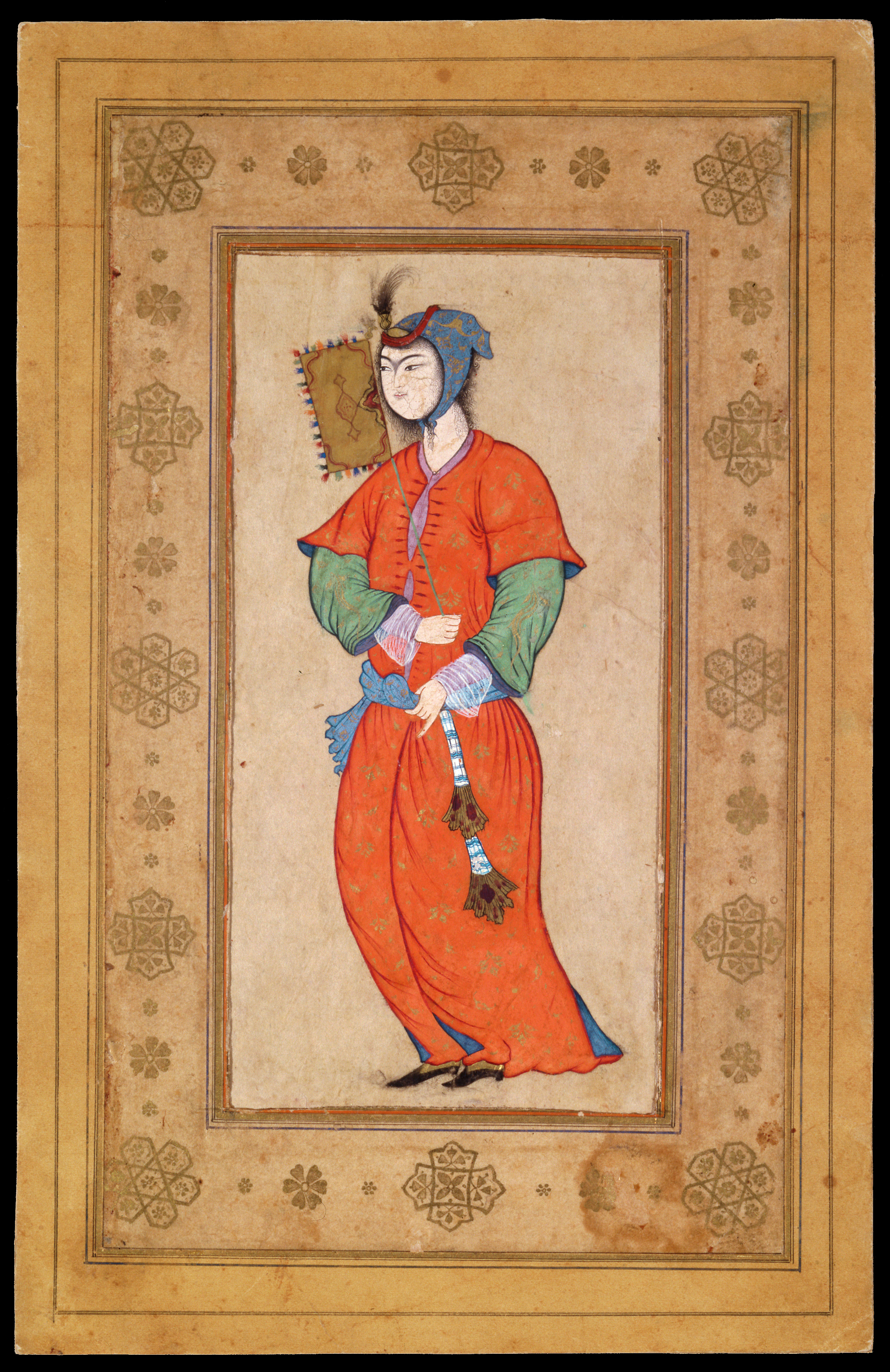
- Artist: Reza Abbasi
- Year: between 1590 and 1600
- Dimensions: 23.5 cm × 15.2 cm (9.3 in × 6.0 in)
- Location: The David Collection, Copenhagen
- Accession: 119/2006

Young Woman with a Fan is a 17th-century Persian miniature painting attributed to the circle of Reza Abbasi, the leading artist of Safavid Iran during the reign of Shah Abbas I. Executed in ink, watercolor, and gold on paper and mounted on an album leaf, the painting depicts a young woman holding a fan.
