= Ali Asghar (painter) =

Safavid painter

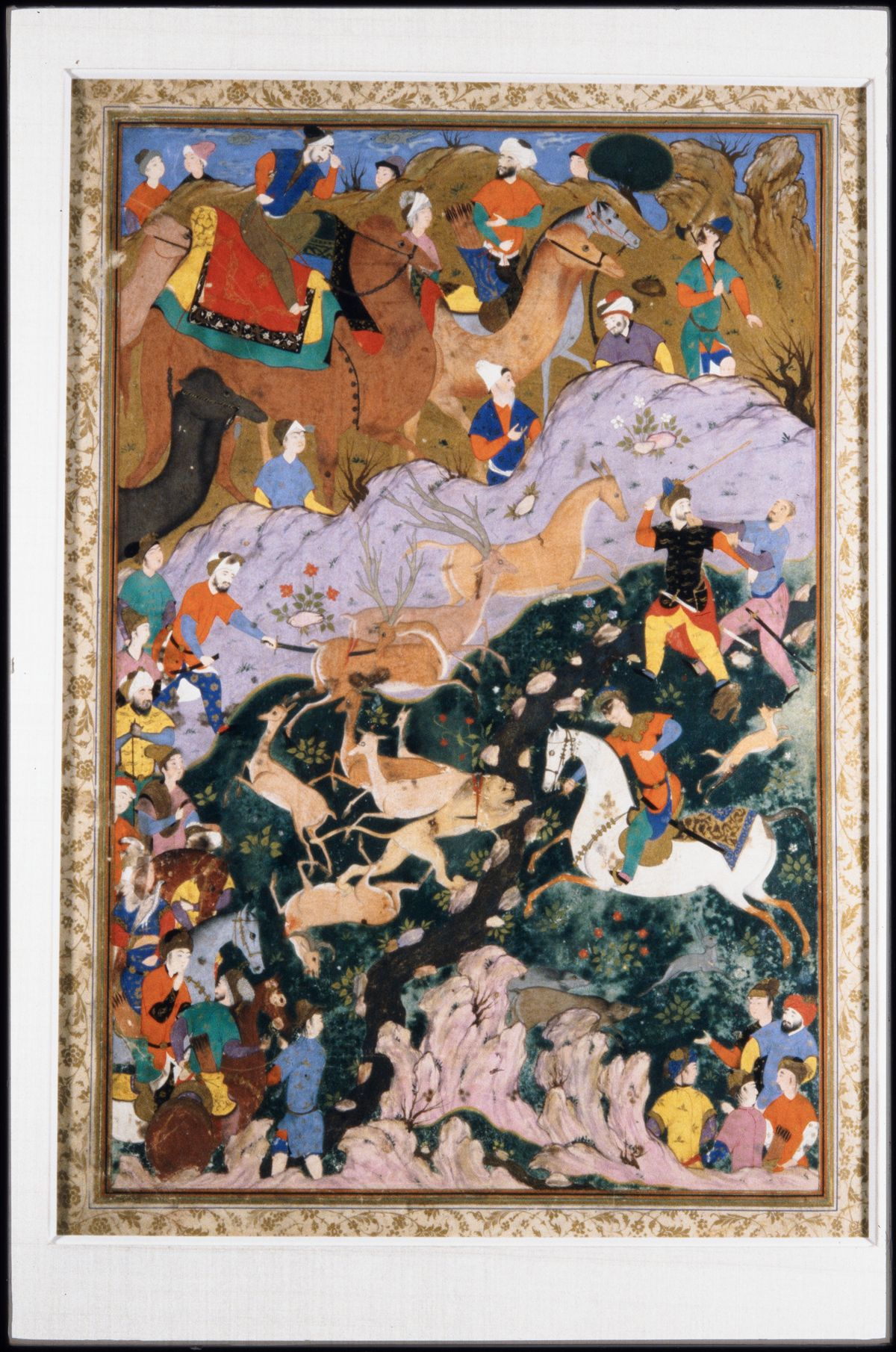
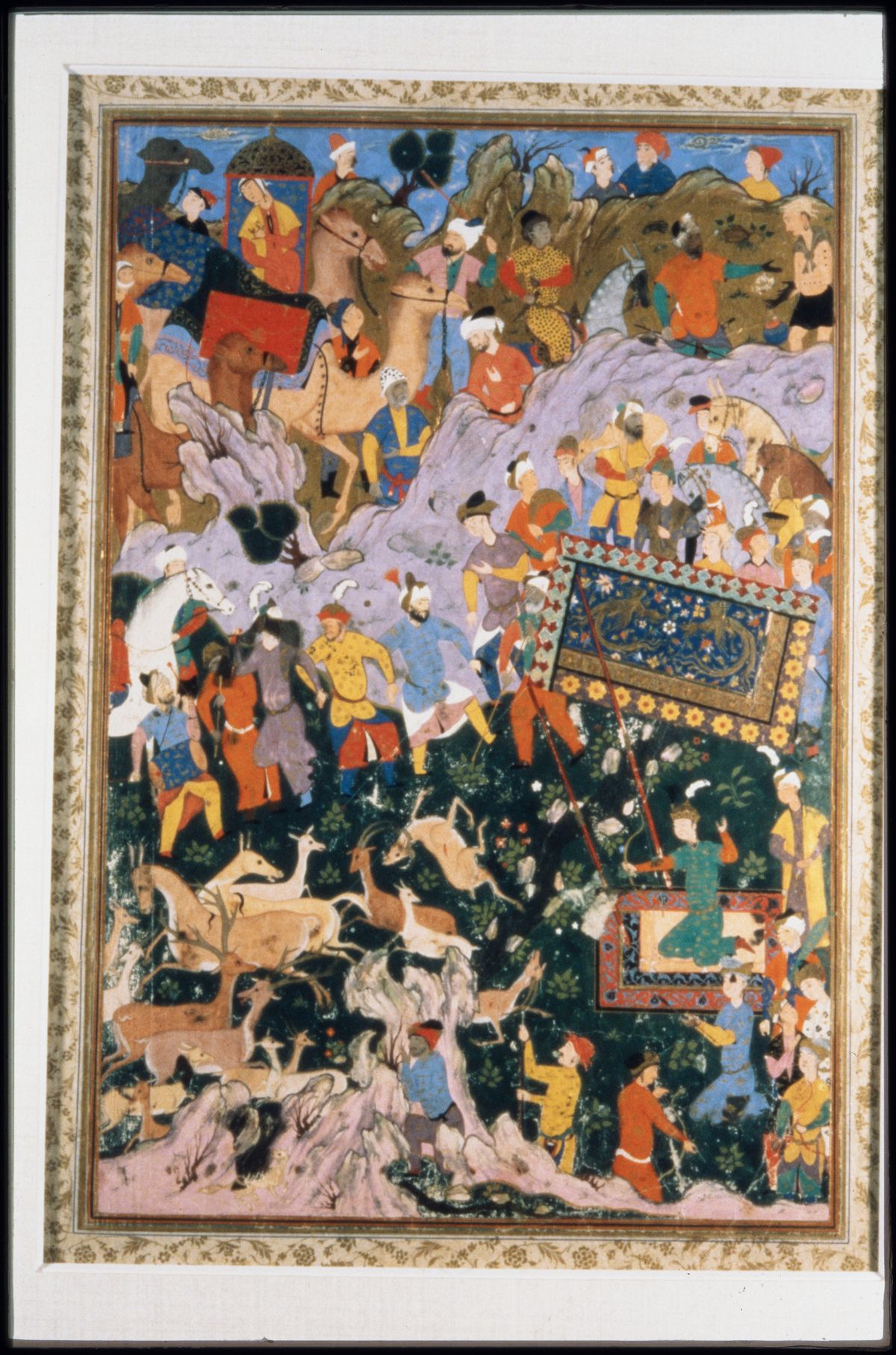
"Royal Hunt", the two-page frontispiece of the Shahnameh of Shah Ismail II attributed to Ali Asghar

Ali Asghar (Persian: علی اصغر; fl. circa 1570–1600) was an Iranian court painter of the Safavid era. He was the father of the renowned miniaturist Reza Abbasi, whose early works were probably influenced by Ali Asghar.

== Biography ==
Ali Asghar was a native of Kashan. According to the accounts of Qazi Ahmad, Ali Asghar was one of his (Qazi Ahmad) teachers in miniature painting. He probably began his career under Safavid Shah Tahmasp I (r. 1524–1576), before moving to Mashhad where he became one of the leading painters in the service of the princely governor Ibrahim Mirza, alongside Sheikh Mohammad and Abd-Allah.

According to the court historian Iskandar Beg Munshi, Ali Asghar excelled in landscape painting (streets and trees). He later worked for Shah Ismail II (r. 1576–1577) at the Safavid capital of Qazvin.

Only two extant paintings bear an attribution to Ali Asghar's own brush: the double-page frontispiece from a 1560s manuscript of Hatefi's Timurnameh, and "Iskandar building the iron rampart" from the 1576–77 Shahnameh of Shah Ismail II. B.W. Robinson has also credited Ali Asghar with painting the two-page frontispiece of this manuscript, "Royal Hunt," based on the aforementioned Shahnameh illustration.

In addition to serving as actual models for the early artwork of his illustrious son Reza Abbasi, Ali Asghar may have been Reza's introduction to the works of Mirza Ali (who thrived from the 1530s until around 1580) and well-known contemporary painters like Sheikh Mohammad and Muhammadi.

== Sources ==
- Canby, Sheila R. (1999). The Rebellious Reformer: The Drawings and Paintings of Riza-yi Abbasi of Isfahan. Bloomsbury Academic.
- Gray, Basil (1986). "The arts in the Safavid period". In Lockhart, Laurence; Jackson, Peter (eds.). The Cambridge History of Iran. Vol. 6: The Timurid and Safavid Periods. Cambridge: Cambridge University Press. ISBN 0-521-20094-6.
- Robinson, B. W. (1988). "ʿAlī Aṣghar, Court Painter". Iran: Journal of the British Institute of Persian Studies. 26 (1): 125–128. doi:10.2307/4299806. JSTOR 4299806.
