= Mohammad Hosayni Emami =

- محمدحسین امامی
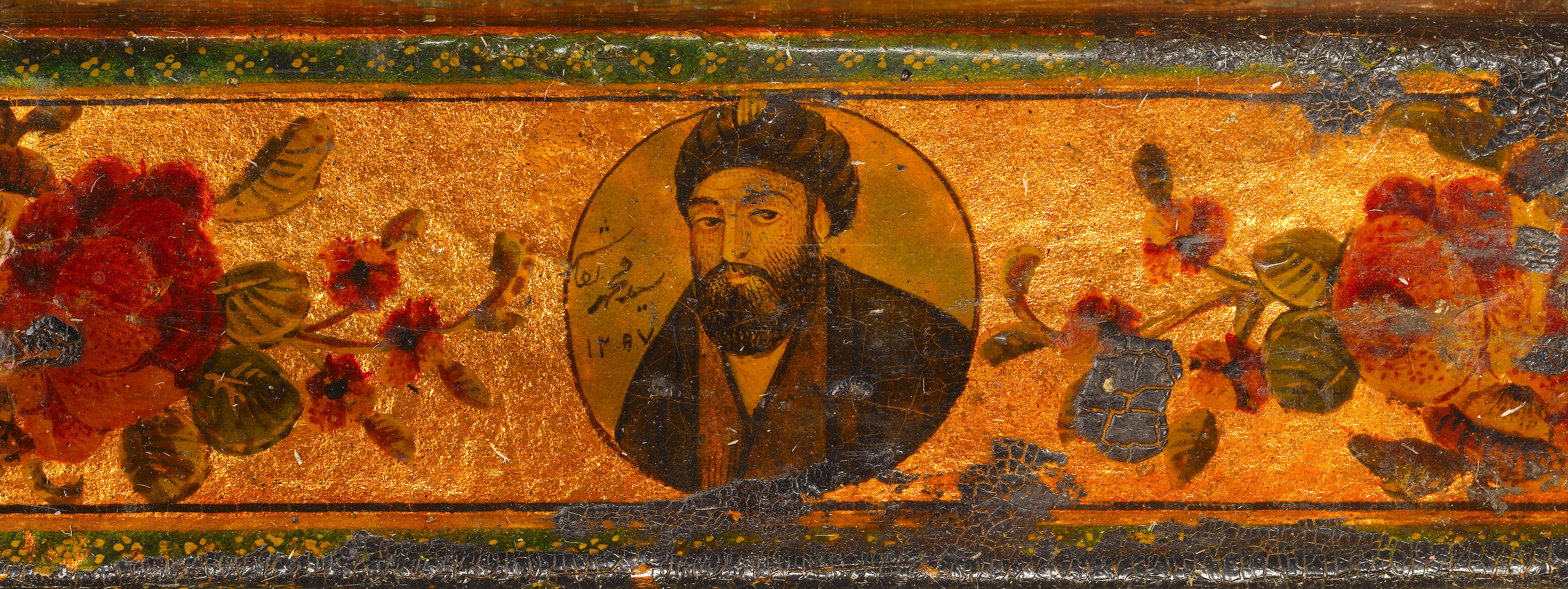
- Self-portrait of Mohammad Hosayni Emami (detail), from a lacquer papier mache Royal Pen-Box (qalamdan-e kiyani), dated 1879
- Born: Isfahan, Qajar Iran
- Known for: Persian lacquer painting, pen-case painting, flower and bird painting, calligraphy
- Movement: Emami school
- Children: Mirza Aqa Emami
- Father: Nasrallah Hosseini Emami
- Relatives: Zinat al-Sadat Emami (granddaughter)

Mohammad Hosayni Emami (also spelled Muhammad Husayni Imami; fl. 1860s–1870s; Persian: محمدحسین امامی) was a notable Iranian lacquer painter from the Emami family in Isfahan, active during the reign of Naser al-Din Shah Qajar (r. 1848–1896). Following his father and his mentor, Nasrallah Hosseini Emami, working in the traditional style, he was most active during the 1860s and 1870s, though he had already painted a portrait of Naser al-Din Shah in 1845 when the Shah was still the heir-apparent. Over the course of his career, Emami achieved the title of naqqash-bashi, and the art historian Basil William Robinson attributes much of Isfahan's finest lacquerwork to him.

Mohammad Hosayni Emami was also the father of Mirza Aqa Emami (born Mohammad Mehdi Emami; 1881–1954), another distinguished member of the Emami family.

== Sources ==
- Floor, Willem (1999). "Art (naqqashi) and artists (naqqashan) in Qajar Persia". Muqarnas Online. 16 (1): 125–154.
- Robinson, B. W. (1986). "ART IN IRAN x.2 Qajar Painting". In Yarshater, Ehsan (ed.). Encyclopædia Iranica. Vol. II/6: Art in Iran I–ʿArūż. London and New York: Routledge & Kegan Paul. ISBN 978-0-71009-106-2.
- Robinson, B. W. (1991). "Persian painting under the Zand and Qājār dynasties". In Avery, Peter; Hambly, Gavin R. G.; Melville, Charles Peter (eds.). The Cambridge History of Iran: From Nadir Shah to the Islamic Republic. Vol. 7. Cambridge: Cambridge University Press. ISBN 0-521-20095-4.
