= Two Lovers =

Two Lovers may refer to:

- "The Two Lovers", a narrative poem written by Marie de France
- Two Lovers (1928 film), a drama film
- Two Lovers (2008 film), a romantic drama film
- "Two Lovers" (Mary Wells song), a 1962 single by Mary Wells
- "Two Lovers" (The Twang song), a 2007 rock single by The Twang
- The Lovers (Abbasi), 17th-century painting by Reza Abbasi (also known as Two Lovers)
- "Two Lovers and a Beachcomber by the Real Sea", a 1955 poem by Sylvia Plath whose title is sometimes abbreviated as "Two Lovers"

== See also ==
- Two Loves (disambiguation)
- My Two Loves
- Two Lovers Point in Guam
