= Zinat al-Sadat Emami =

- زینت‌السادات امامی
- Born: Sakina al-Sadat Emami; 14 February 1935 (age 91); Isfahan, Iran
- Known for: Persian miniature, manuscript illumination, tash'ir, flower-and-bird painting, gilding, sukht
- Father: Mirza Aqa Emami
- Relatives: Mohammad Hosayni Emami (grandfather)
- Awards: High Award of the Fajr International Festival of Visual Arts; First-class artistic certificate

Zinat al-Sadat Emami (Persian: زینت‌السادات امامی; born Sakina al-Sadat Emami on 14 February 1935) is an Iranian miniature painter and practitioner of traditional Iranian arts. Her work encompasses Persian painting, manuscript illumination, tash'ir, flower-and-bird painting, gilding and Sookht, a technique combining painted, cut and inlaid leather.

Emami is the daughter of the painter and lacquer artist Mirza Aqa Emami and a member of the Emami family of Isfahan. She is particularly known for the panel Mi'raj, a large work combining several forms of painting, illumination, leather mosaic and gilding, which she produced over approximately three decades.

== Early life and family ==
Emami was born on 25 Bahman 1313 in the Solar Hijri calendar, corresponding to 14 February 1935, in Isfahan. She grew up in a family associated with painting, manuscript decoration, lacquerwork and the applied arts.

Her father, Mirza Aqa Emami, was a painter, illuminator, lacquer artist and carpet designer active during the late Qajar and early Pahlavi periods. He was known for Persian miniature painting, flower-and-bird compositions and the development of independent pictorial panels using Sookht. Her grandfather, Mohammad Hosayni Emami, and earlier members of the family had also worked in painting and the decoration of lacquer objects.

Although her birth name was Sakina al-Sadat, she became known professionally as Zinat al-Sadat Emami.

== Training ==
Emami began formal artistic training at the age of eighteen. She studied miniature painting and flower-and-bird painting with her father for approximately two years and two months, until his death in 1955.

Her father taught her Persian painting in a style derived from Safavid painting and flower-and-bird compositions associated with the Qajar tradition. According to Emami, she initially copied exercises prepared for the students in her father's workshop before working on more complex arabesque and khata'i designs.

After her father's death, she continued her studies with artists who had been connected to his workshop. She learned manuscript illumination and tash'ir from Hossein Khata'i and studied Sookht with Aqa Taqi Kolbasi. Both had been pupils or associates of Mirza Aqa Emami.

Emami also studied with the painters Hossein Behzad and Mohammad Hossein Mosavar ol-Molki. She learned the gilding and gold-tooling stages used in leatherwork from her mother and grandmother.

== Artistic career ==
Emami has worked in Persian painting, illumination, tash'ir, flower-and-bird painting, leather cutwork and gilding. Much of her career has been devoted to preserving techniques associated with the traditional workshops of Isfahan and transmitting them through teaching.

Her miniature paintings generally employ conventions associated with Safavid painting, while her flower-and-bird works draw upon traditions developed during the Zand and Qajar periods. She has also illuminated Qur'ans and calligraphic panels.

In addition to producing independent artworks, Emami has taught students through classes and workshops. Her teaching has included miniature painting, illumination, flower-and-bird painting and the processes used in Sookht.

== Sookht ==
A major part of Emami's work is associated with Sookht, a group of techniques historically used in the production of decorated leather bookbindings. The process may involve preparing and colouring thin leather, cutting it into individual shapes, assembling the pieces as a mosaic, creating openwork sections, painting details and applying gold.

In the works of Mirza Aqa Emami and his workshop, these bookbinding techniques were adapted for independent framed panels. The panels could combine leather mosaic, openwork, painting, manuscript illumination, tash'ir, flower-and-bird imagery and gilding. Zinat al-Sadat Emami continued this workshop tradition and contributed to the preservation of the technique after her father's death.

Her work in this medium has been the subject of academic research, including a master's thesis devoted to leather Sookht mosaic with particular reference to her works.

== Mi'raj ==
Emami's best-known work is the panel Mi'raj, depicting the ascension of Muhammad. The panel measures approximately 100 by 130 centimetres and took about three decades to complete.

The work combines miniature painting, leather mosaic, openwork, layered leather, manuscript illumination, tash'ir, flower-and-bird painting, outlining and gilding. Emami consulted the religious scholars Ahmad Emami and Hassan Emami concerning the work's iconography and religious content.

The composition was partly inspired by historical Persian depictions of the ascension, including the well-known Safavid painting attributed to Sultan Muhammad.

The completed panel was publicly unveiled at the Museum of Contemporary Art in Isfahan in December 2006 during an exhibition organised in connection with an international conference on prophetic art.

== Other works ==
Works attributed to Emami include:

- Bahram Gur
- The Throne of Solomon
- Noah's Ark
- Shaykh San'an and the Christian Maiden
- The Nomad
- Golriz Qur'an
- flower-and-bird paintings and floral compositions
- illuminated Qur'ans and calligraphic panels

These works employ different combinations of miniature painting, illumination, tash'ir, leatherwork and gilding.

In 2025, a 515-page Qur'an written in a script attributed to Yaqut al-Musta'simi was unveiled with illumination and a lacquer binding decorated with a flower-and-bird design by Emami.

== Recognition ==
Emami received the High Award at the first edition of Iran's Fajr International Festival of Visual Arts. Holders of the award from the first three editions were subsequently approved to receive a first-class artistic certificate from Iran's national council for the evaluation of artists.

In 2006, she was honoured in Isfahan as a prominent practitioner of Sookht.

The Iranian Society for the Appreciation of Cultural Works and Dignitaries held a ceremony in her honour on 23 December 2022. The society subsequently published a volume titled The Life and Cultural and Artistic Contributions of Zinat al-Sadat Emami, containing biographical material and essays on her work.

An exhibition honouring Emami was presented in Isfahan in January 2024 as part of an exhibition devoted to women artists from the city.

== Documentary ==
Emami was the subject of the documentary Continuing Beauty (Persian: زیبایی دنباله‌دار), directed by Reza Abbasi and produced by Sadra Sedouqi. The film was made as part of the television documentary series Mirror of a Lifetime and was broadcast on Iran's Channel 4 in February 2025.
