= Mo'en Mosavver =

Persian painter (1610s–1693)

- معین مصوّر
- Born: 1610s Isfahan, Safavid Iran
- Died: 1693; Isfahan (probably), Safavid Iran
- Years active: 1630–1693
- Style: Persian

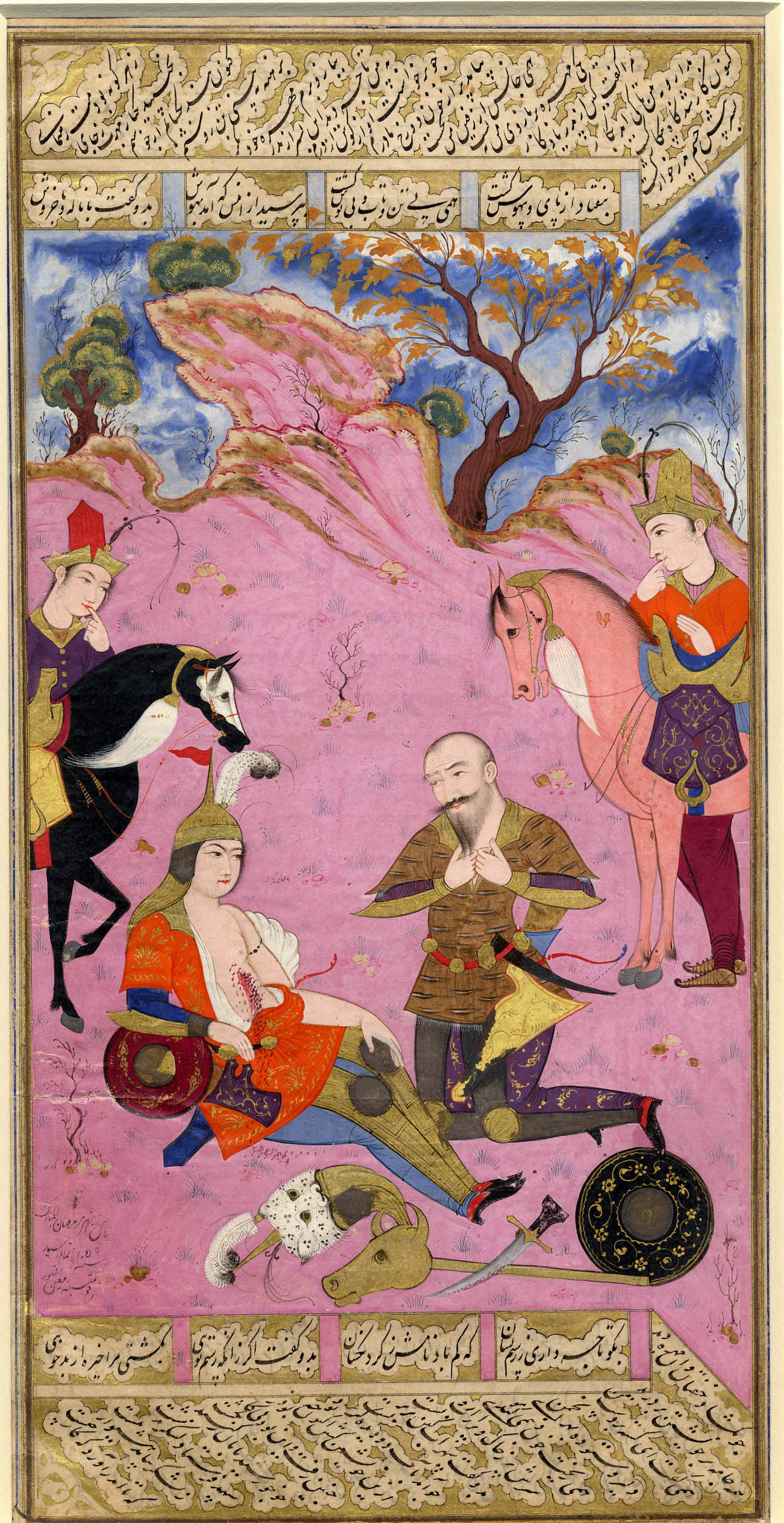
Muin Musavvir: Rostam kills Sohrab, Shahnameh by Ferdowsi, 1649. British Museum

Mo'en Mosavver or Mu‘in Musavvir (Persian: معین مصوّر, lit. 'Mo'en the illustrator'; c. 1610s–1693) was one of the most significant Persian miniaturists of Safavid Iran. Not much is known about Mo'en's personal life, except that he was born in ca. 1610–1615, became a pupil of Reza Abbasi, the leading painter of the day, and probably died in 1693. Over 300 miniatures and drawings attributed to him survive. He was a conservative painter who partly reversed the advanced style of his master, avoiding influences from Western painting. However, he painted a number of scenes of ordinary people, which are unusual in Persian painting.

Muin was born in Isfahan and probably spent all of his life in this city. He enjoyed a long and successful career stretching from around 1630 to 1693.

== Career ==
He is notable as a master of illustration paintings especially figures, and compositions depicting banquet and battle scenes. He specialized in illuminated manuscripts and border decorations.

He illustrated animals and landscapes and other Aqa Mirak styles with significant virtuosity. He mostly used watercolor in his painting and remained faithful to the Isfahan school and Reza Abbasi. Other prominent painters influenced him, including Behzad, Mohammadi, and Sadiqi Beg. He had several prominent pupils. Some of his manuscripts are signed by them. He was a contemporary and friend of famous painters including Shafi' Abbasi.

== Gallery ==
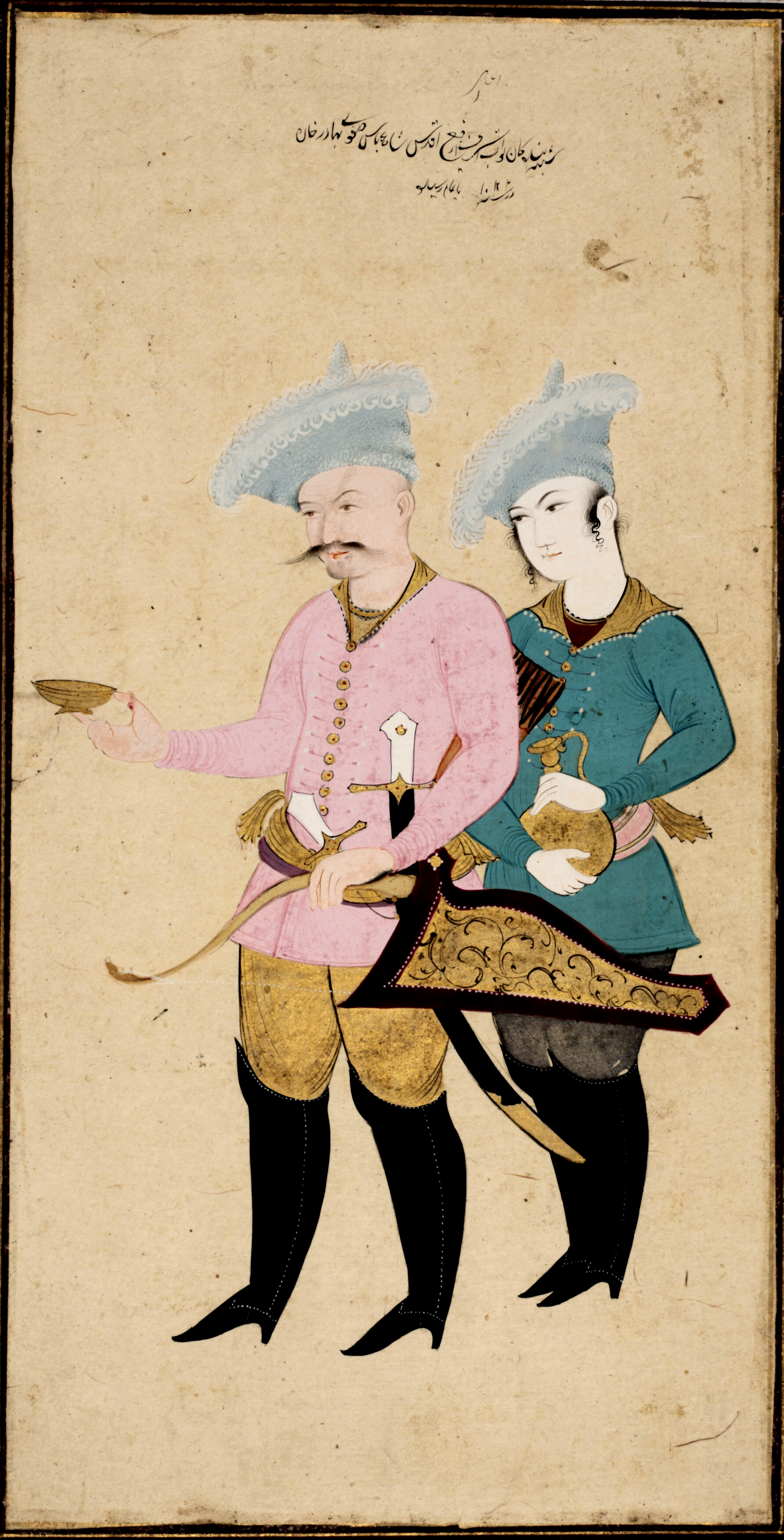
Standing Portrait of Abbas the Great with one attendant, attributed to Mo'en Mosavver, dated 1632/33

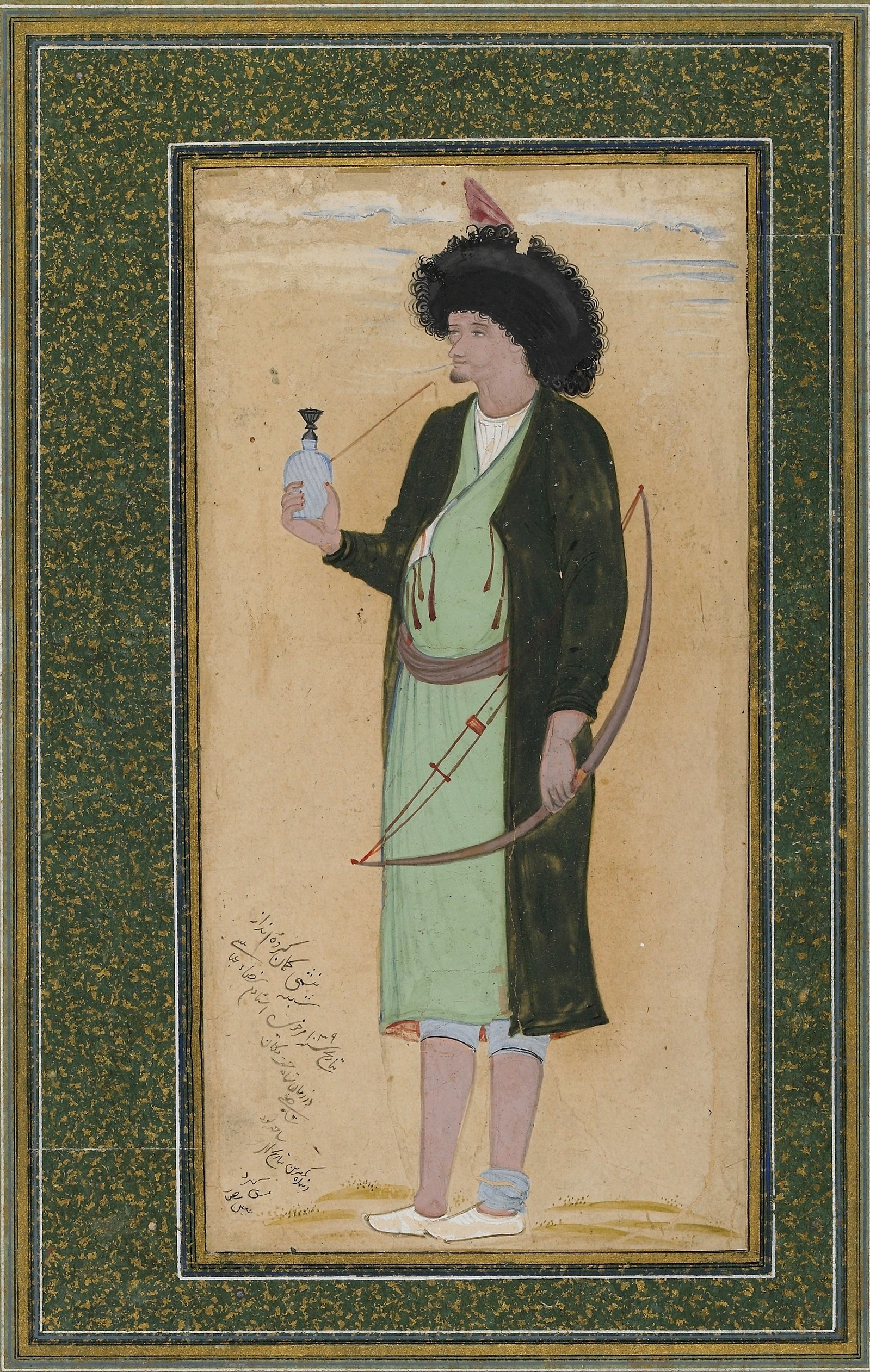
Archer, version of this painting by Reza Abbasi

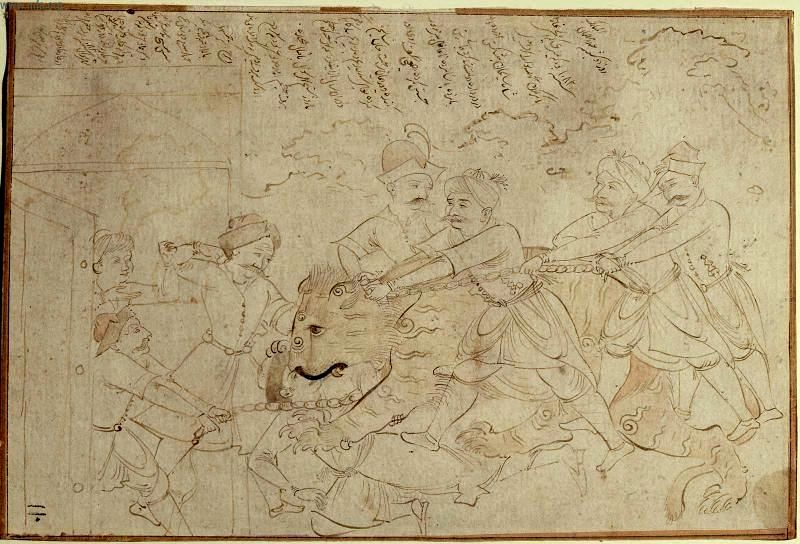

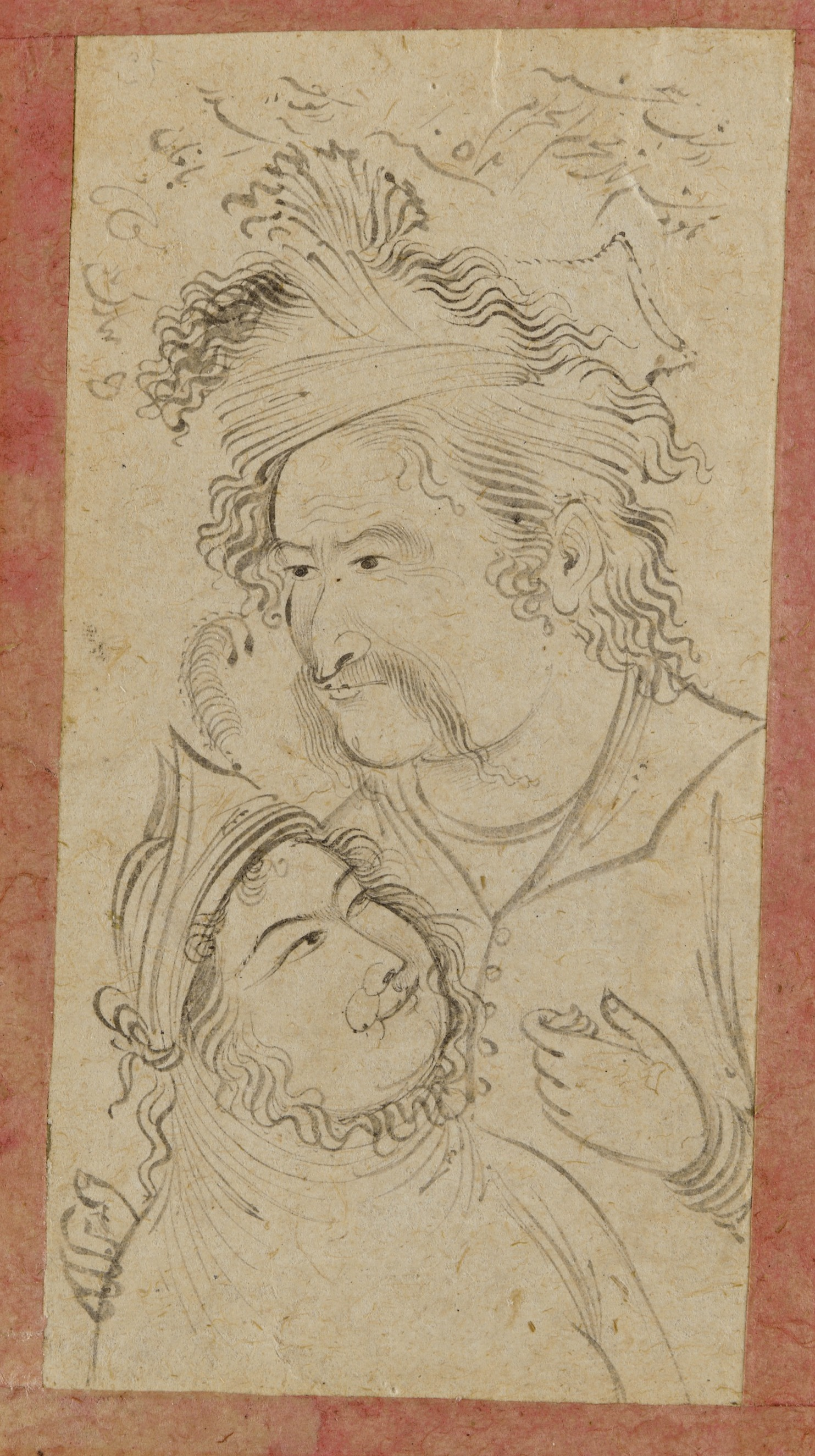

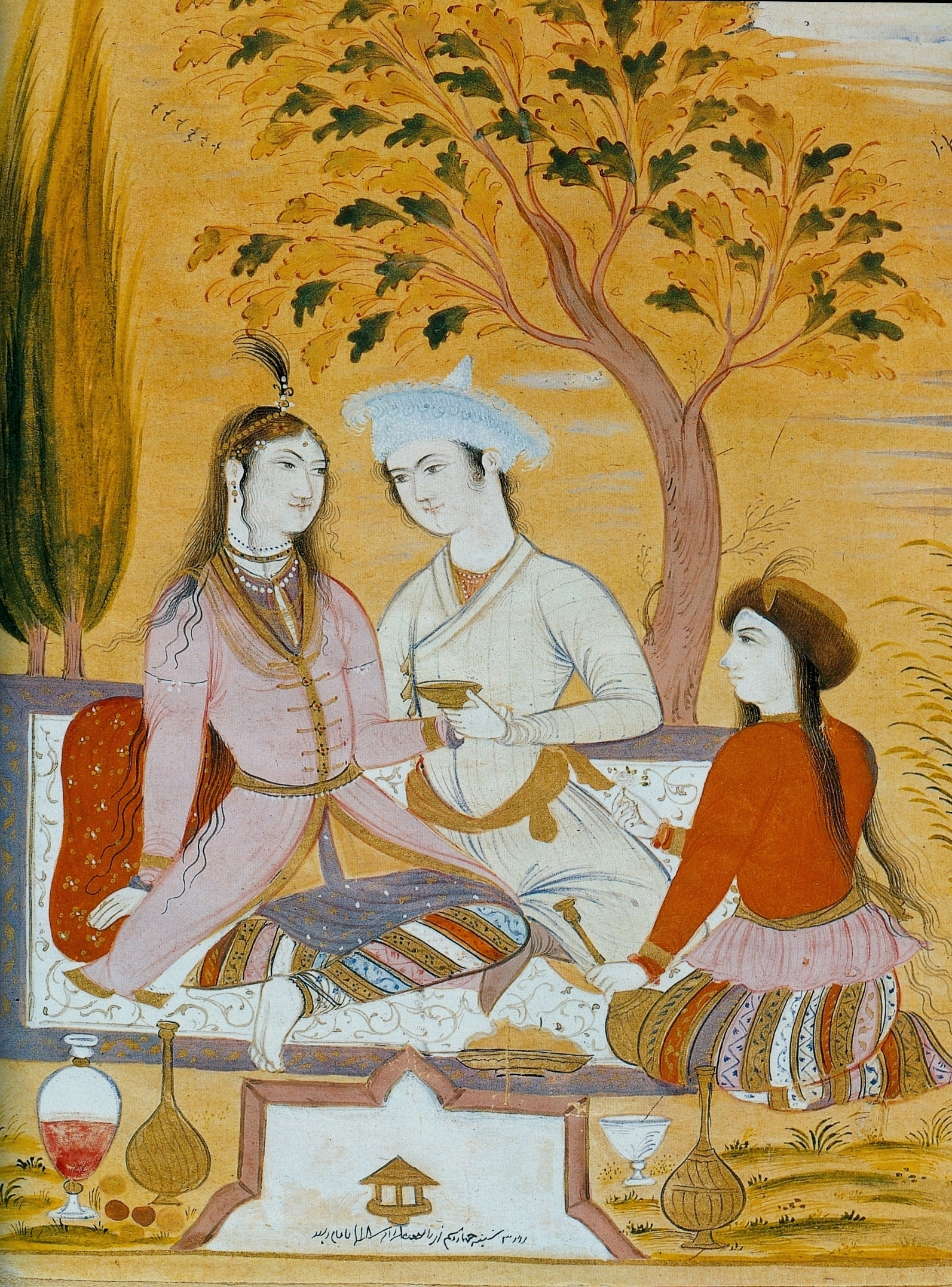

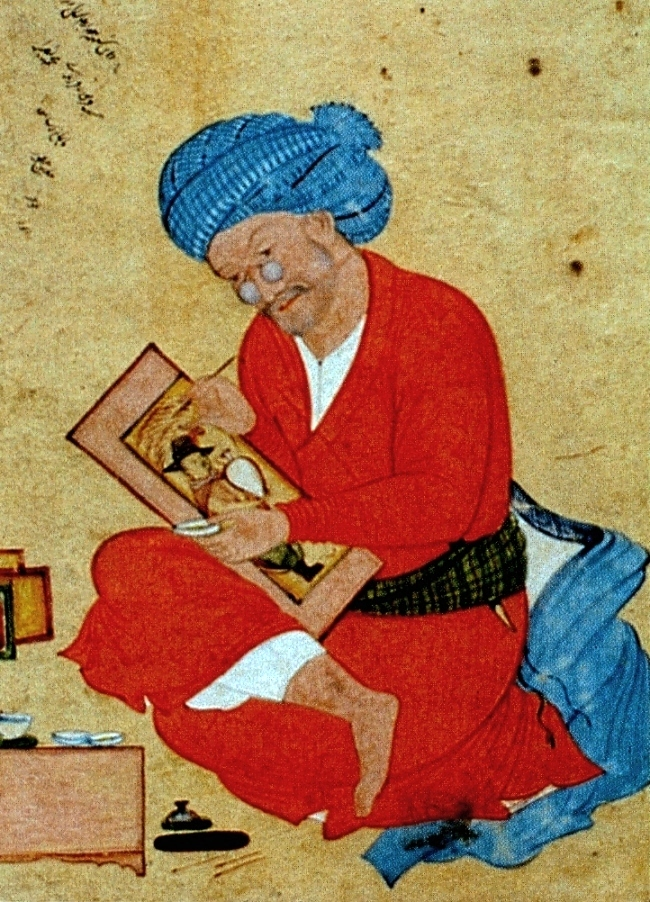
Portrait of Reza Abbasi, 1673

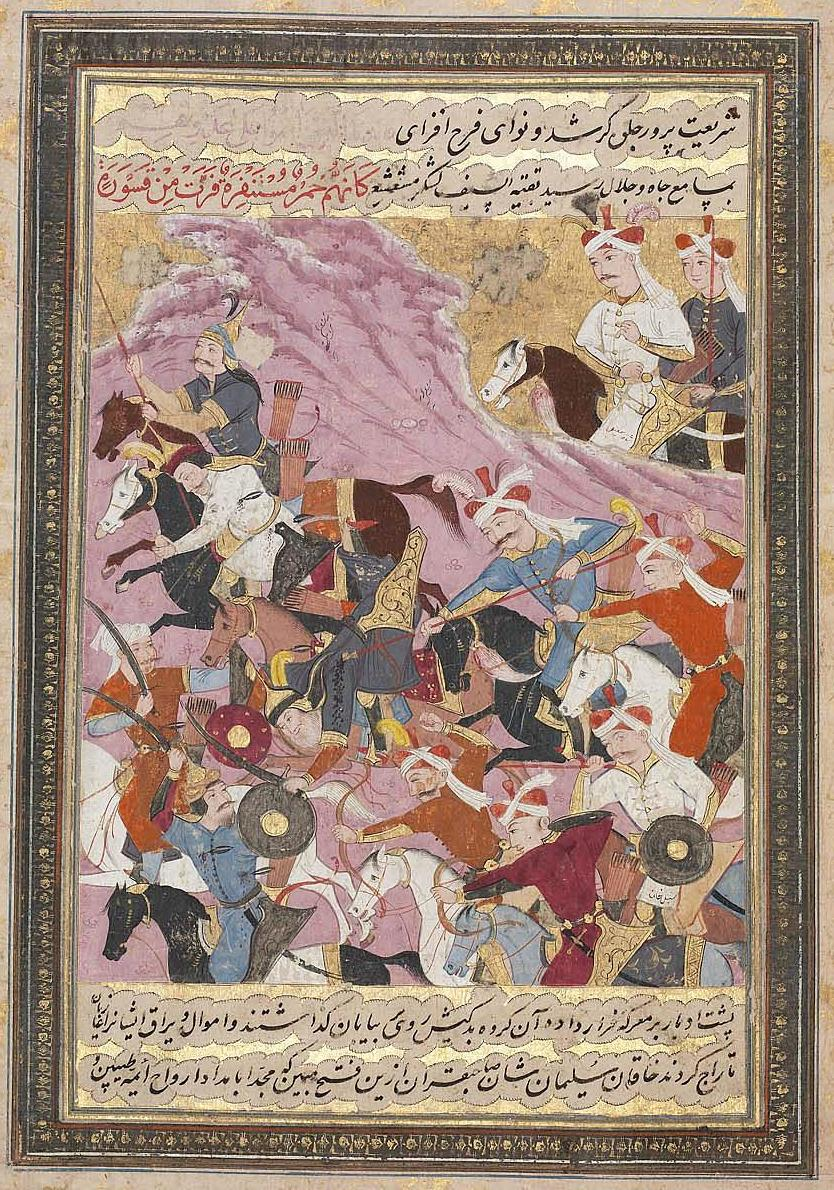
Shah Ismail I (r. 1501–1524) watches his troops defeat the Musha'sha leader Sultan Fayyad, created c. 1688

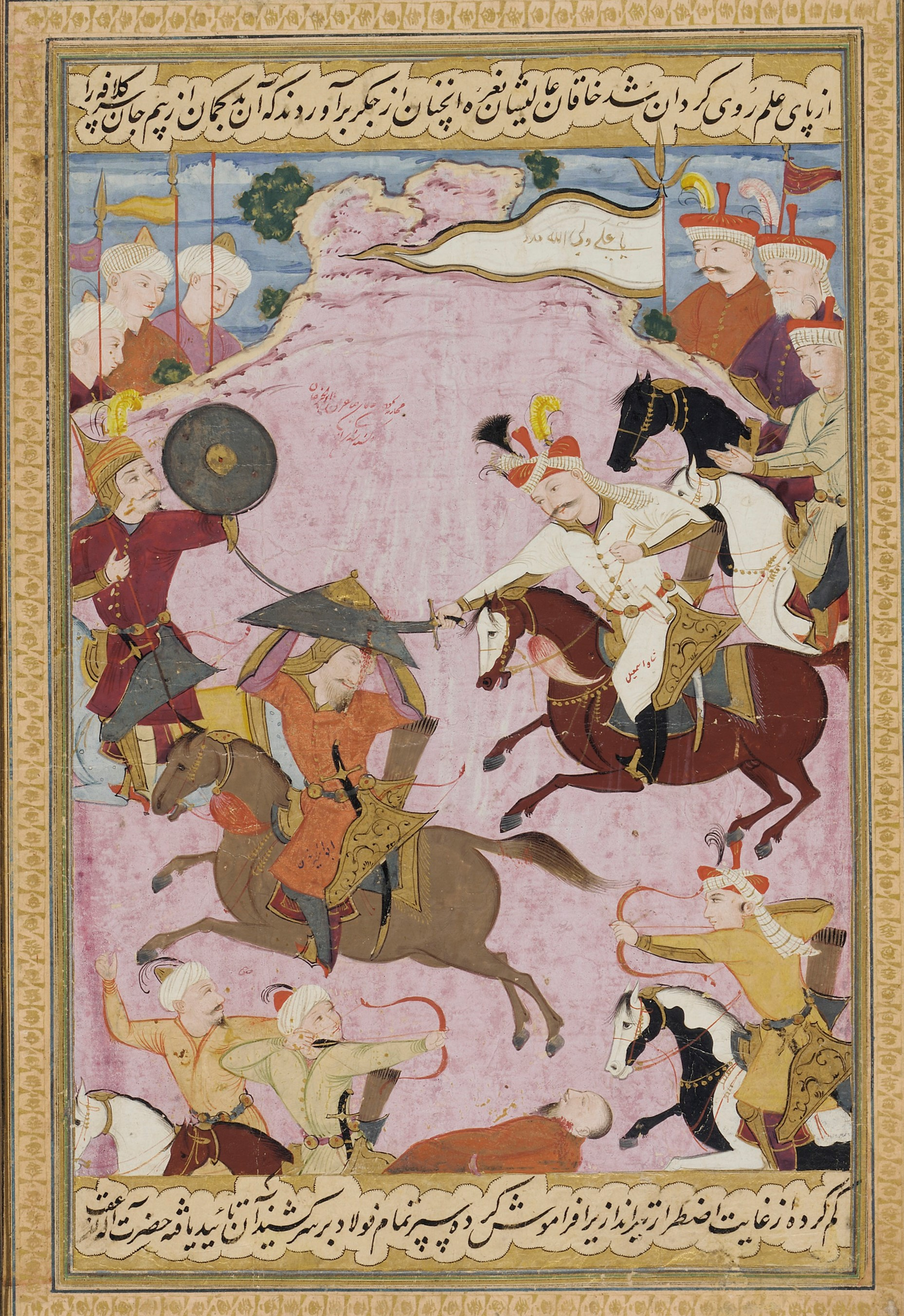
The battle of Merv between Shah Ismail I and Shaybani Khan, created c. 1688

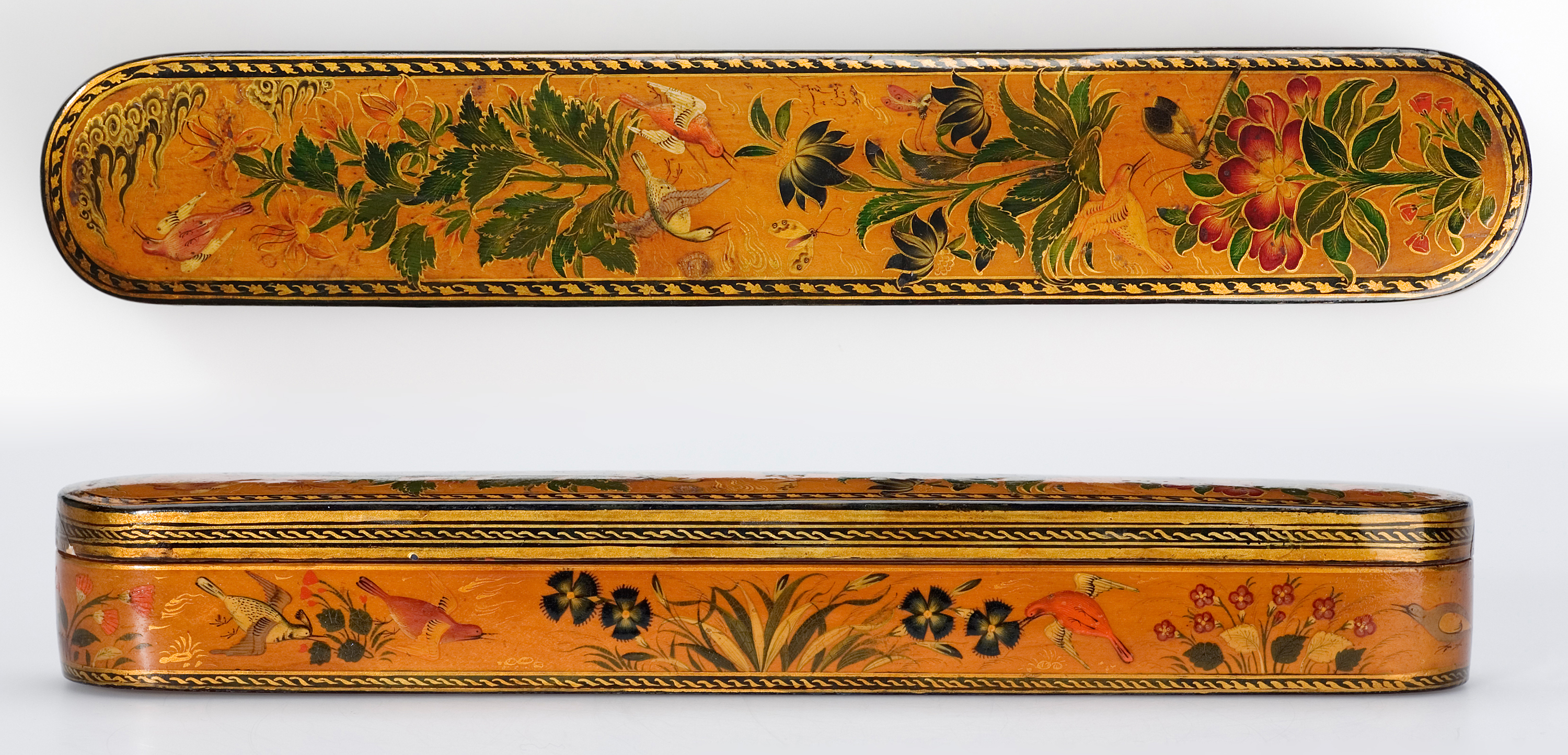
Lacquer pen box, the only one known to have been painted by Muin

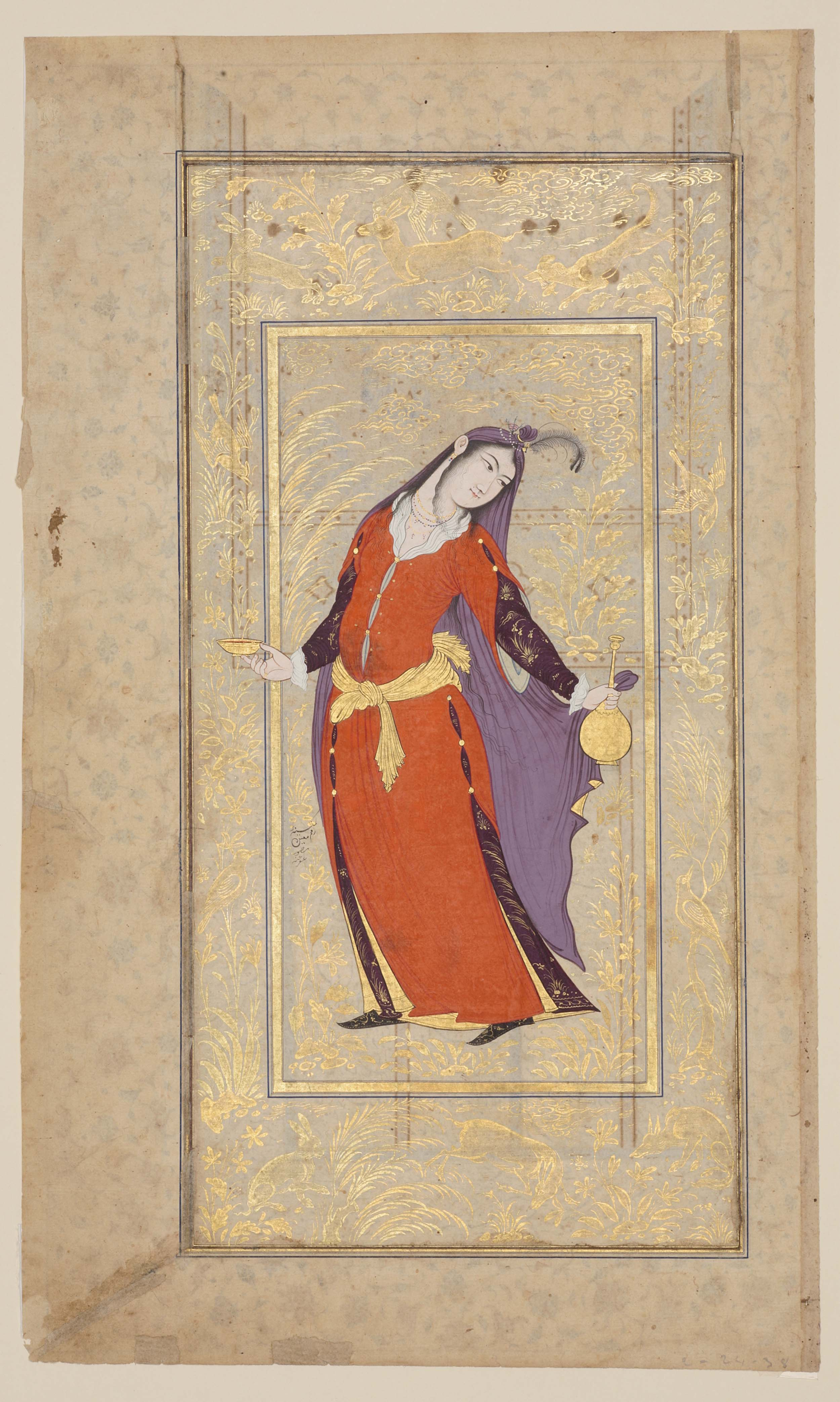
Woman with Indian headdress, from an exemplar of the Shahnameh, 1648
