= Two Loves (disambiguation) =

Two Loves is a 1961 American drama film.

Two Loves may also refer to:

== Film ==
- Two Loves (1912 film), a short film directed by Gaston Méliès
- Les deux amours, a 1917 French film directed by Charles Burguet and released in English as Two Loves
- Two Loves (1949 film), a French comedy film

== Music ==
- Two Loves (album), a 1973 album by pianist Duke Jordan
- "Two Loves", a 1968 single by Sean Dunphy & The Hoedowners
- "Two Loves/Never Again", a 1969 single by the American vocal group The Cheers

== Other uses ==
- "Two Loves", an 1892 poem by Lord Alfred Douglas ending "the Love that dare not speak its name"
- Moya Prechistenka, or Two Loves, a 2006 Russian TV pilot directed by Boris Tokarev

== See also ==
- My Two Loves, a 1986 American film
- Two Lovers (disambiguation)
