= Mirza Aqa Emami =

Iranian painter

- میرزا آقا امامی
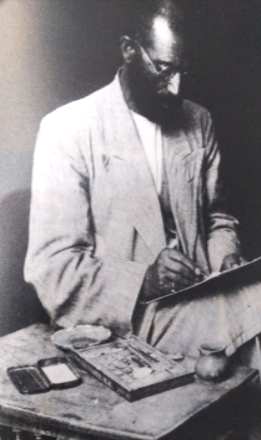
- Emami at work
- Born: Mohammad Mehdi Emami; 1881; Isfahan, Qajar Iran
- Died: 1955 (aged 73–74); Isfahan, Pahlavi Iran
- Resting place: Takht-e Foulad, Isfahan
- Education: Majma'-ol-Sanaye, Tehran
- Known for: Persian miniature, lacquer painting, illumination, sookht, carpet design
- Children: Zinat al-Sadat Emami
- Relatives: Mohammad Hosayni Emami (father)

Mirza Aqa Emami (Persian: میرزا آقا امامی; born Mohammad Mehdi Emami; 1881–1955), also known as Haj Mirza Aqa Emami, was an Iranian painter, miniaturist, lacquer artist, illuminator and carpet designer. Active during the late Qajar and early Pahlavi periods, he worked in a wide range of traditional Iranian arts, including miniature painting, flower-and-bird painting, manuscript illumination, lacquerwork, pen-case painting, carpet design and the leather-cutwork technique known as sookht.

Emami is particularly associated with the revival of Safavid-inspired painting in twentieth-century Isfahan and with transforming sookht, traditionally used in the decoration of leather bookbindings, into a medium for independent pictorial panels. He also maintained a workshop in Isfahan and trained a number of artists, including Mahmoud Farshchian.

== Early life and family ==
Emami was born in Isfahan into a family of painters, lacquer artists and calligraphers. His father, Mohammad Hosayni Emami, was a painter of lacquer objects and flower-and-bird compositions active during the reign of Naser al-Din Shah Qajar. His paternal grandfather, Nasrallah Hosseini Emami, was also a painter and lacquer artist and held the title of naqqash-bashi, or chief painter.

Members of the wider Emami family had been involved in painting, lacquerwork, manuscript decoration and architectural calligraphy in Isfahan for several generations. Emami initially studied Islamic religious sciences and appeared publicly in clerical dress. Alongside these studies, he learned floral painting and other decorative techniques within his family workshop.

He later abandoned formal religious study in order to pursue art professionally. He travelled to Tehran and studied at the Majma'-ol-Sanaye, a state-supported institution for arts and crafts. There he received instruction from Sani Homayun, a painter and illuminator associated with the Qajar lacquer tradition. His training included miniature painting, illumination, drawing and the technical preparation of lacquered objects.

After completing this period of training, Emami returned to Isfahan, where he spent most of his professional life.

== Career ==
Emami worked during a period in which Iranian artists were responding both to the decline of traditional court and manuscript patronage and to the increasing presence of European academic and photographic imagery. His surviving drawings indicate that he understood naturalistic drawing and Western-influenced portraiture, but most of his finished works remained closely connected to Iranian pictorial traditions.

He drew extensively from the art of the Safavid period, particularly the Isfahan school and the work of Reza Abbasi. His compositions frequently include courtly gatherings, lovers, musicians, hunting scenes and figures placed in gardens or idealised landscapes. He also copied or reinterpreted earlier Safavid compositions as part of the broader revival of traditional painting in late Qajar and early Pahlavi Iran.

Emami's activities were not limited to paintings on paper. He designed and decorated lacquer pen cases, book covers, mirror cases, boxes, doors, jewellery and other small objects. He also produced illumination, marginal decoration, calligraphic inscriptions, textile designs and cartoons for pictorial carpets.

His workshop produced both independent artworks and commissioned decorative objects. Some pieces were collaborative: Emami provided designs or painted sections, while specialists in woodworking, lacquer preparation, leather cutting, weaving or calligraphy completed other parts of the object.

== Flower-and-bird painting ==
Flower-and-bird painting formed a significant part of Emami's work. His compositions combine traditions established in the later Safavid, Zand and Qajar periods with a more naturalistic observation of individual plants and birds. Flowers represented in works attributed to him include roses, jasmine, primroses, dahlias and flowering fruit branches; the birds include doves, partridges and pigeons.

A study of five of his flower-and-bird paintings found that the arrangements were generally asymmetrical but visually balanced. Flowers and birds were often organised through triangular compositions, with repeated forms and colours creating unity across the picture surface.

Emami's flower-and-bird designs were applied to paper, lacquered objects, leather panels and carpet cartoons. A reproduction of one of his flower-and-bird compositions was also used on Iranian currency during the Pahlavi period.

== Sookht panels ==
Emami is particularly known for his work in sookht, a form of leather mosaic and cutwork. In the traditional process, thin pieces of dyed or gilded leather are cut into ornamental shapes and assembled on the surface of a book cover. The technique developed in Iran during the Timurid and Safavid periods but declined as lacquered bindings and mechanically produced book covers became more common.

During the late Qajar and early Pahlavi periods, Emami and several artists associated with his workshop adapted the technique to the production of independent framed pictures. Rather than using cut leather only as an ornamental book cover, Emami combined leather mosaic, miniature painting, gilding, illumination and painted borders in large pictorial panels.

Researchers have credited him with a central role in the emergence of the independent sookht panel. These works often contained several layers of decoration: a principal painted figure or narrative scene, cut-leather borders, floral ornament, animal imagery, calligraphy and painted wooden frames.

One of his best-known works in this medium depicts Shirin in a landscape holding a wine bottle and porcelain cup. The central painting is surrounded by cut and gilded leather, verses from Nizami Ganjavi's Khosrow and Shirin, and subsidiary scenes relating to the poem. The work is signed raqam-e kamtarin Mirza Aqa Emami Esfahani, meaning “drawn by the most humble Mirza Aqa Emami of Isfahan”, and is dated 1308 SH, corresponding to 1929–1930.

== Carpet design ==
Emami also designed pictorial carpets. According to accounts of his career, he became interested in carpet production after observing a shortage of accomplished carpet cartoons and established a workshop in Isfahan to revive older designs. He selected compositions and colours and collaborated with professional dyers and weavers.

His carpet designs include garden scenes, flowers, animals and narrative subjects derived from Persian literature. In these works, the structure of miniature painting was translated into woven form, with figures and landscape elements arranged within highly detailed pictorial fields.

== Teaching ==
Emami directed a workshop that trained artists in miniature painting, illumination, lacquerwork, flower-and-bird painting and sookht. Artists identified as his pupils include Hossein Khata'i, Hossein Eslami, Hadi Tajvidi, Mirza Reza Eslami and Mahmoud Farshchian.

Farshchian was introduced to Emami as a young student and studied Persian painting under his supervision before entering the Isfahan School of Fine Arts, where he continued his education under Isa Bahadori. Emami's teaching introduced Farshchian to the visual traditions of Timurid and Safavid painting and to the technical disciplines of traditional Isfahan workshops.

Emami also trained members of his own family. His daughter, Zinat al-Sadat Emami, learned miniature painting, flower-and-bird painting and sookht from him and later became a practitioner of traditional Iranian arts.

== Selected works ==
Works attributed to or signed by Emami include:

- Shirin in a Landscape Holding a Wine Bottle and Porcelain Cup, dated 1308 SH (1929–1930), gouache and gold on leather with cut-leather borders.
- Youths Picnicking with Attendants in a Landscape, early twentieth century, gouache and gold on paper.
- Siyavash and Sudabeh, a Safavid-inspired narrative painting based on the Shahnameh.
- Shah Abbas Seated on a Terrace, gouache and gold on paper, signed by Mehdi al-Emami.
- Painted and lacquered doors, mirror cases, pen cases, book covers and boxes decorated with figures, floral designs and scenes derived from Persian poetry.

A brush drawing associated with Emami and dated to approximately 1910–1925 is held by the Museum Rietberg in Zürich. Other works are held in Iranian institutional and private collections, including collections formerly administered by the Pahlavi Foundation and later transferred to the Mostazafan Foundation.

== Death and legacy ==
Emami died in Isfahan in 1955 and was buried in the northern section of the Mosalla cemetery at Takht-e Foulad. His career linked the hereditary lacquer and flower-and-bird traditions of the Emami family with the twentieth-century revival of Persian miniature painting in Isfahan.

His principal contribution to sookht was the development of the technique beyond bookbinding and its use in independent framed compositions. His workshop practice also brought together painting, leatherwork, lacquer, illumination, calligraphy and carpet design within a single artistic environment.

A monograph, The Life and Artistic Works of Haj Mirza Aqa Emami, by Mehdi Vafamehr, was published in Isfahan with introductory essays by Mahmoud Farshchian, Aydin Aghdashloo and Mohammad-Ali Karimzadeh Tabrizi.
