= The Lovers (Abbasi) =

1630 painting by Reza Abbasi

- Courtly Lovers, Two Lovers
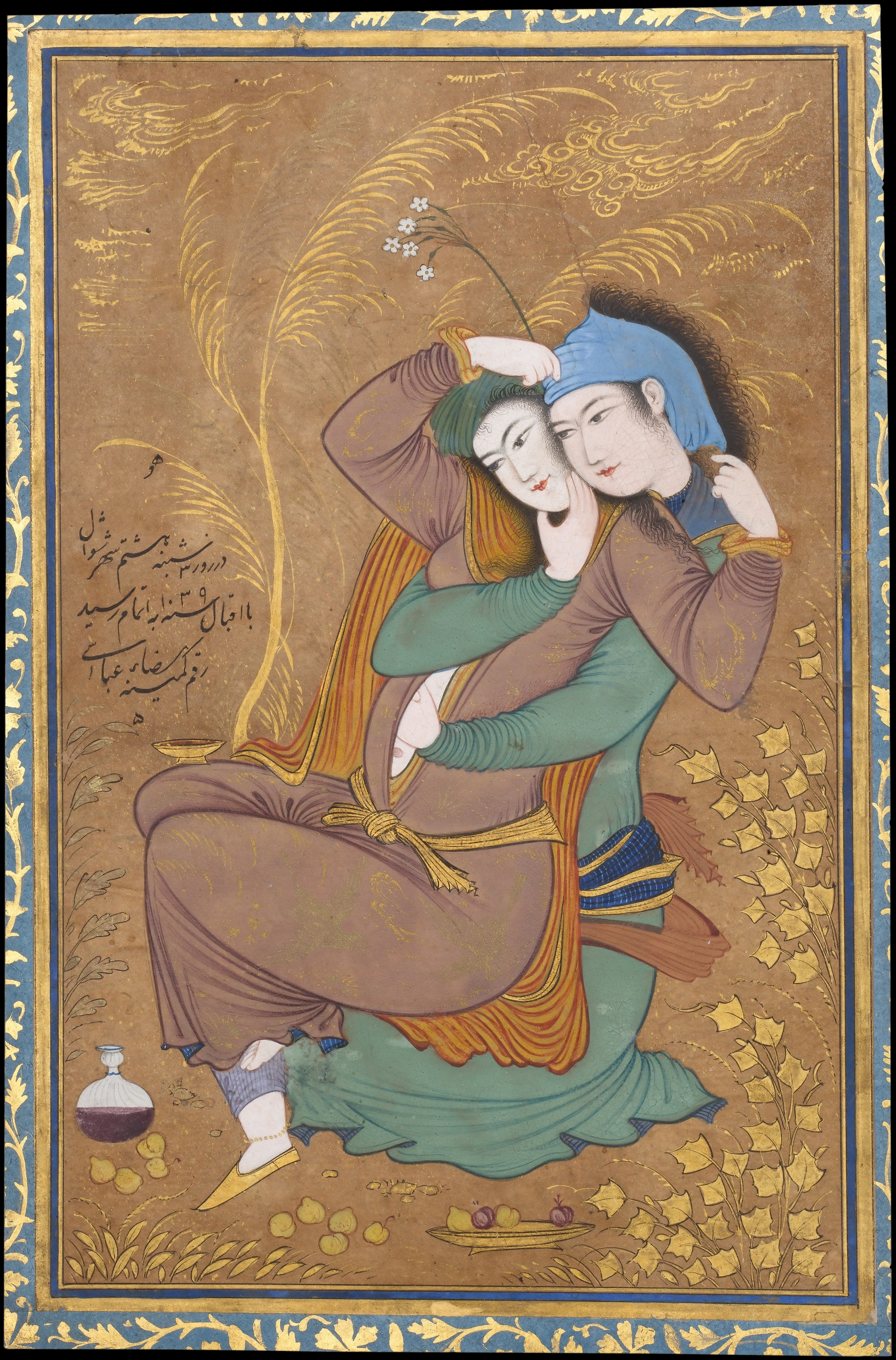
- Artist: Reza Abbasi
- Year: 1630
- Medium: Opaque watercolor, ink, and gold on paper
- Dimensions: 17.5 cm × 11.1 cm (6.9 in × 4.4 in)
- Location: Metropolitan Museum of Art; New York City
- Accession: 50.164

The Lovers, alternatively titled Two Lovers or Courtly Lovers, is an early 17th-century painting by Iranian artist Reza Abbasi. Done in a combination of ink, watercolor, and gilding on paper, the work depicts a couple of lovers embracing each-other. The painting is in the collection of the Metropolitan Museum of Art.

== Description ==
The painting depicts a pair of lovers embracing each-other. The bodies of the two are posed so as to be evocative of passionate foreplay, while their faces remain impassive - a common theme in contemporary Safavid art. The costume of the lovers are rich and dark in contrast to the brown background with gold-hued highlights. The quality of the clothing implies that the male figure is wealthy and that the woman is likely a prostitute (a profession that was legal in Safavid Iran at the time). Further reinforcing the sensual nature of the painting is the partially-exposed navel of the woman, her uncovered feet (though she remains clothed and her hair is covered), and the way in which her breast is caught by the male figure's arm. Clouds, flowers, and trees are also present in the painting, serving to encircle the couple, while a carafe of wine and half-empty plate of fruit lies by their feet, implying some indulgence has already taken place.

Lovers was painted by Iranian artist Reza Abbasi in 1630. At the time, Abbasi had already become known as a bold, innovative painter of drawings and album miniatures - a break from the traditional artistic establishment of Safavid Iran, which favored illustrations. Though the artist had previously painted the nude female figures, the introduction of a male figure in Lovers elevated the work from simply evoking erotic thoughts to outright representing courting.

Though his controversial style posed a threat to his career, Abbasi became a favorite painter of Abbas I, a connection which allowed for Abbasi to continue his work.

Lovers was gifted to the Metropolitan Museum of Art in 1950 by Francis M. Weld.
