= Basil William Robinson =

British art scholar and author

Basil William Robinson, FBA, FSA, FRAS (20 June 1912 – 29 December 2005) was a British art scholar and author, specializing in Asian art and history.

== Life ==
Robinson was born in London, and attended Winchester College and Corpus Christi College, Oxford. He joined the staff of the Victoria and Albert Museum in 1939 and was shortly afterwards transferred to the Department of Metalwork where, apart from war service in the East from 1939 to 1946, he spent the rest of his career. He served as Keeper of the Department of Metalwork from 1966 until his retirement in 1972.

In 1967 he was elected honorary president of the To-ken Society of Great Britain and was president of the Royal Asiatic Society from 1970 to 1973. He was a Fellow of the Society of Antiquaries and a Fellow of the British Academy.

His principal fields of scholarship were: Persian miniature paintings (he developed the standard classification and chronology), Japanese swords, and the artist Utagawa Kuniyoshi (he established the artist's place among the great masters of ukiyo-e).

He died in 2005. He had married twice: firstly Mary Stewart, who died in 1954, and secondly Oriel Steel, with whom he had a son and a daughter.

== Works ==
Robinson's publications include:

- Robinson, B. W., Islamic art in the Keir collection, London, Boston, Faber and Faber, 1988
- Robinson, B. W., Islamic painting and the arts of the book, London, Faber and Faber, 1976
- Diba, Layla, S., Maryam Ekhtiar with essays by B.W. Robinson, Royal Persian paintings, the Qajar epoch, 1785-1925, Brooklyn, N.Y., Brooklyn Museum, 1998
- Robinson, B. W., Japanese sword-fittings and associated metalwork, Genève, Collections Baur, 1980
- Robinson, Basil W., Orient d'un collectionneur: miniatures persanes, textiles, céramiques, orfèvrerie rassemblés par Jean Pozzi, collections du Musée d'art et d'histoire, Genève, du Musée historique des tissus, 1992
- Robinson, B. W., Persian paintings in the India Office Library, a descriptive catalogue, London, Sotheby Parke Bernet, 1976
- Robinson, B. W., Persian paintings in the John Rylands Library, a descriptive catalogue, John Rylands University Library of Manchester, 1980
- Khalili, Nasser D., B.W. Robinson and Tim Stanley, Nasser D. Khalili Collection of Islamic Art, Lacquer of the Islamic lands, Oxford University Press, 1996
- Omar Khayyam, Rubaiyat of Omar Khayyam, Persian miniatures, translation by Edward Fitzgerald, notes by B. W. Robinson, New York, Crescent Books, 1979
- Robinson, B. W., Arms and armour of old Japan, London, Her Majesty's Stationery Office, 1951
- Robinson, B. W., Arts of the Japanese sword, London, Faber and Faber, 1961
- Robinson, B. W., Arts of the Japanese sword, 2nd ed., London, Faber and Faber, 1970
- Robinson, B. W., Chinese cloisonné enamels, London, Her Majesty's Stationery Office, 1972
- Robinson, B. W., Descriptive catalogue of the Persian paintings in the Bodleian Library, Oxford, Clarendon Press, 1958
- Robinson, B. W., Fifteenth-century Persian painting, problems and issues, New York : New York University Press, 1991
- Robinson, B. W., Hiroshige, New York, Barnes & Noble, 1964
- Robinson, B.W., "Hiroshige", Paris, marabout université, 1963
- Robinson, B. W., The John Rylands Lalā wa Majnūn and the Bodleian Nawāʻī of 1485; a royal Timurid manuscript, Manchester, 1954
- Robinson, B. W., Kuniyoshi, London, Her Majesty's Stationery Office, 1961
- Robinson, B. W., Kuniyoshi, ein Meister des japanischen Farbholzschnitts, Essen, Burkhard-Verlag, 1963
- Robinson, B. W., Kuniyoshi, the warrior-prints, Ithaca, N.Y., Cornell University Press, 1982
- Robinson, B. W. and Basil Gray, Persian art of the book: catalogue of an exhibition held at the Bodleian Library to mark the sixth International Congress of Iranian Art and Archaeology, Oxford, Bodleian Library, 1972
- Robinson, B. W., Persian drawings from the 14th through the 19th century, Boston, Little, Brown, 1976
- Robinson, B. W., Persian miniature painting from collections in the British Isles, London, Her Majesty's Stationery Office, 1967
- Robinson, B. W., Persian miniatures, New York, Citadel Press, 1957
- Robinson, B. W., Les Plus beaux dessins persans, Paris, Éditions du Chêne, 1966
- Robinson, B. W., Primer of Japanese sword-blades, Leatherhead, Surrey, Dyer, the Printer, 1955
- Robinson, B. W., Some illustrated Persian manuscripts in the John Rylands Library, Manchester, [n.d.]
- Robinson, B. W., Studies in Persian art, London, Pindar Press, 1993
