= Turkman style =

Persian miniature style

Turkman style

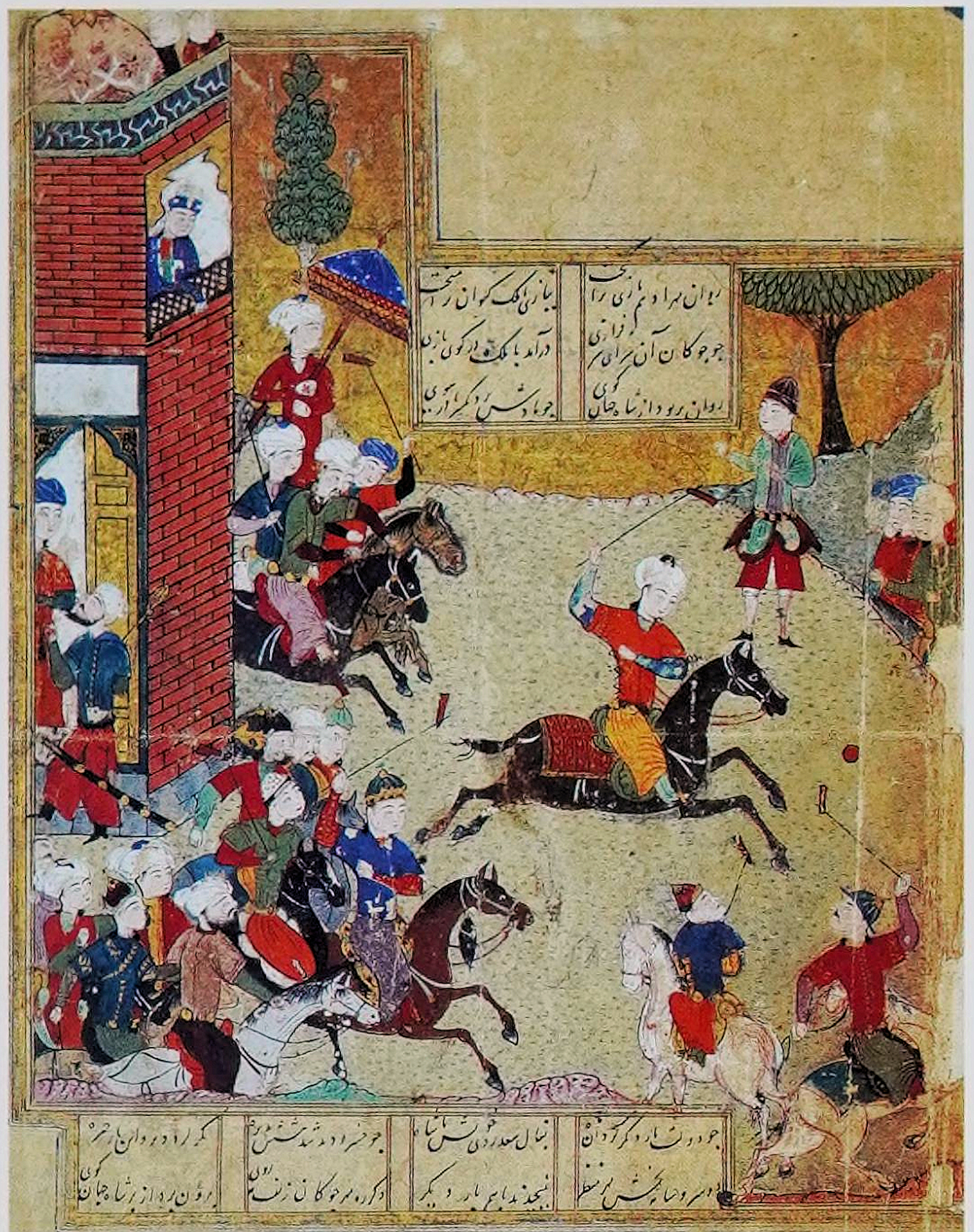
"Mihr playing polo", in Mihr u Mushtari by Assar. Tabriz, 1420. The earliest appearance of the "Turkman Commercial style" of the Qara Qoyunlu.

Turkman style is a style in Persian miniature painting that emerged in the 15th century. The British art scholar Basil William Robinson coined the term in the 1950s to differentiate this style from a more polished style made in courts of Timurid and Turkman rulers. It was given the name "Turkman" because the Qara Qoyunlu and Aq Qoyunlu tribes, known as Turkoman, ruled western Iran in the second half of the 15th century, where the Turkman style was centered.

The quality of Turkman style was wide-ranging, with many fine early illustrations and some outstanding works belonging to the late 15th-century "metropolitan or royal Turkman styles", while there were also many creations of lesser quality, belonging to the so-called "commercial Turkman style".

== Definition ==
In an effort to differentiate a specific painting style that flourished in Iran during the 15th century in the paintings created under the Timurid Empire, Western historians coined the notion of Turkman style in the middle of the 20th century. When Persian miniature painting was initially periodized in the 1930s, there were initial attempts to identify Turkman paintings. The German art scholar Ernst Kühnel used published samples from significant collections of Persian painted manuscripts to categorize the paintings of each era.

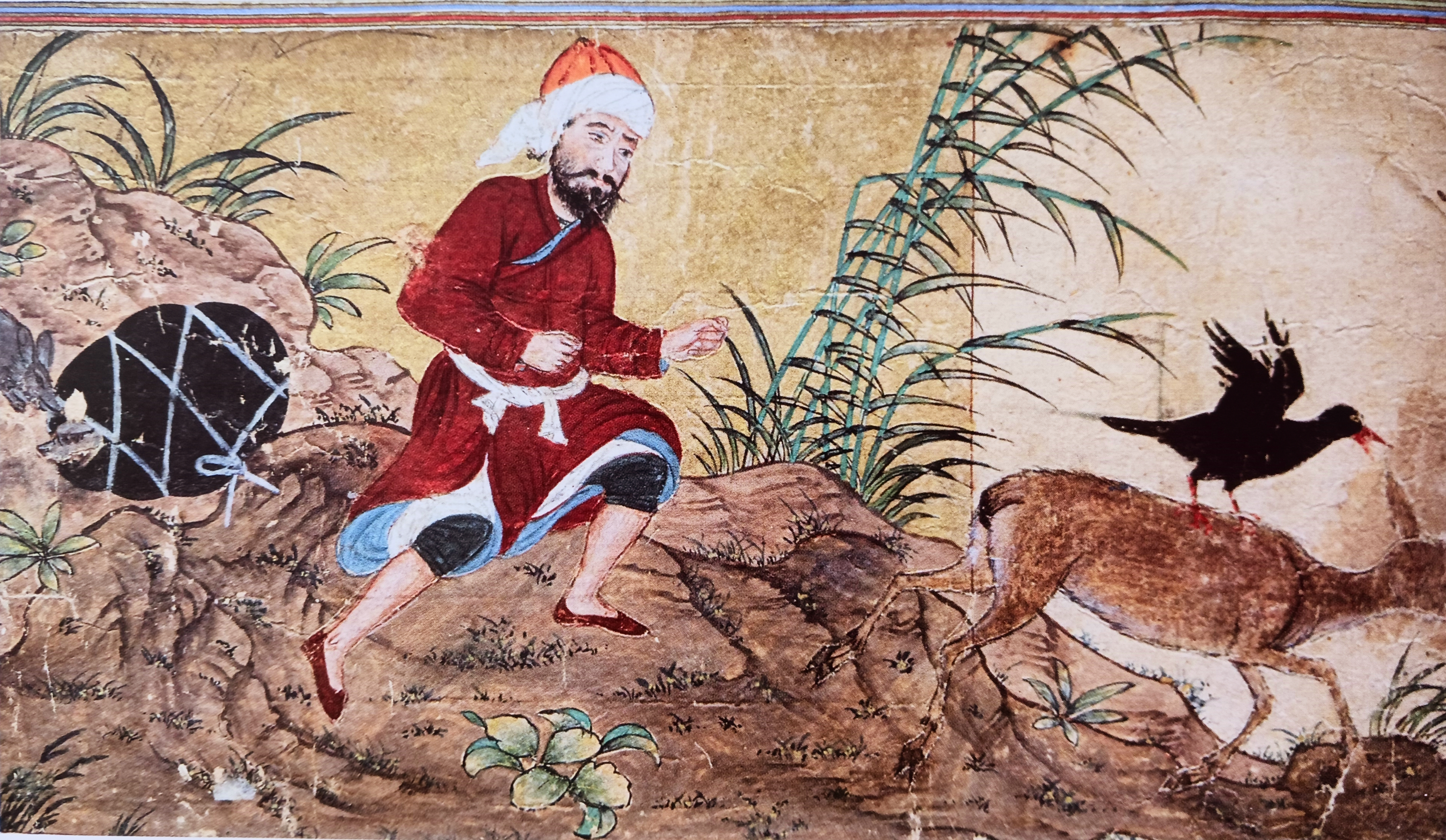
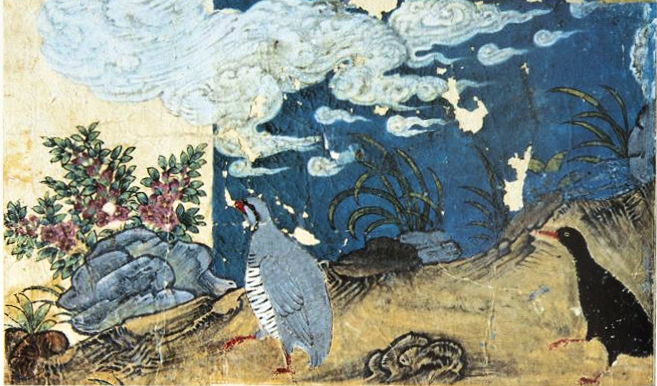
Scenes from Kalila and Dimna (1370-74) created under Shaykh Uvays at the peak of the Jalayirid school in Tabriz

He included the paintings made under the Qara Qoyunlu in the division of the "Tabriz School," and considered them as an evolution of the styles developed under their predecessors, particularly the Jalayirids, in his article in Pope and Ackerman's Survey of Persian Art (1938–1939). With the publication of a study in 1954 by Basil William Robinson that offered stylistic standards for identifying what he termed "Turkman Commercial" and described its evolution up to 1505, the term became firmly established. Between the 1480s and the 1490s, the Turkman style thrived.

=== Inception ===
The capital city of Tabriz already had a strong and highly sophisticated miniature tradition from the time of the preceding Turco-Mongol Jalayirid Sultanate. Historically, the Tabriz school of miniatures was founded in the 14th century (before the Shiraz and Herat schools), and was based on the Mongol Ilkhanid and Uighur pictorial traditions. Tabriz was the center of origin of the kitabkhana system of ateliers, which then spread through the Orient at a scale comparable to the European Renaissance.

The creations of Tabriz in the 14th century can be seen in exquisite works such as Kalila and Dimna (1370-74) created under Shaykh Uvays at the peak of the Jalayirid school, a later Kalila and Dimna (MS Topkaki H.362) created in Tabriz in 1375–1385, or one of the very first Khamsa of Nizami (1386-88). Already in the 14th century, Tabriz was a cultural hub functioning as the center of many Turkic states in the region, and already incorporated elements of Turkic art and culture. The expressive quality of these creations in a sense surpasses anything that came before of after. At the time of his conquest of Tabriz in 1386 (which he would hold until 1405), the Turco-Mongol invader Timur relocated many of the Tabriz artists to Samarkand, influencing the styles in the Timurid realm, in Samarkand, Herat, and Shiraz. The Jalayirids finally recovered Tabriz in 1405, and a remarkable illustrated manuscript was still created there in the last years of Sultan Ahmad Jalayir's rule in 1405–1410, the Khosrow and Shirin (Freer Gallery of Art). The style of this work had much in common with the productions of Baghdad, the other Jalayirid capital, but with a higher degree of finition.

== Qara Qoyunlu creations (1419–1468) ==
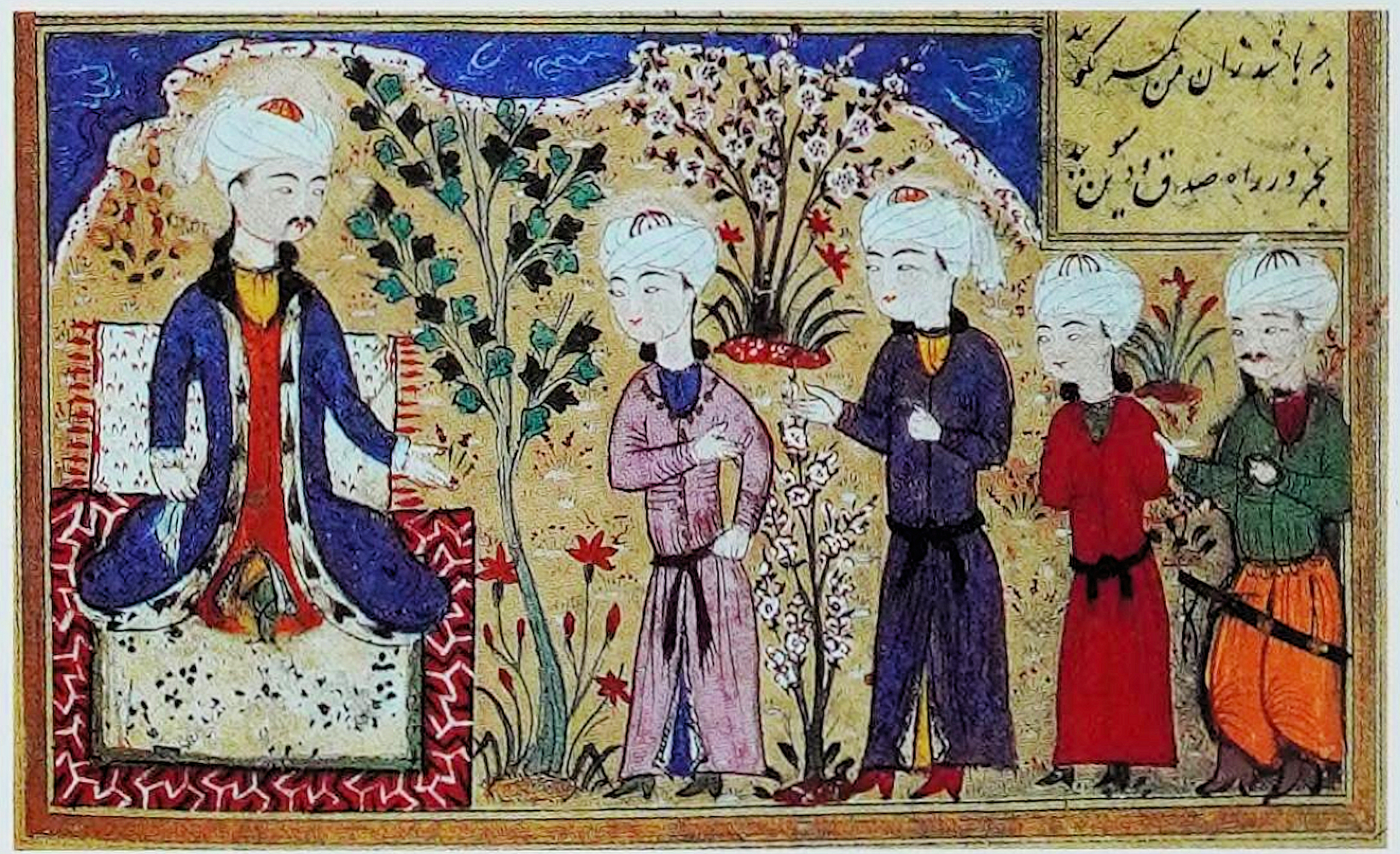
Bahram, a seated man on a carpet, receiving four merchants (folio 32v). Mihr u Mushtari, 1419.

The Qara Qoyunlu captured Tabriz as their new capital in 1410, killing the last major Jalayirid ruler Ahmad Jalayir. Some of the first recorded instances of "Turkman style" go back to 1419-1420 in Tabriz. Arguably the first identifiable Turkman style miniatures go back to the 1419-1420 creation by the Qara Qoyunlu of the Mihr u Mushtari illustrated manuscript by Assar. This copy was likely created following the Qara Qoyunlu occupation of Tabriz in 1410-1420. The manuscript was undoubtedly created by a scribe from Tabriz named Ja'far al-Tabrizi, but the actual production may have alternatively taken place somewhere else, possibly in Yazd under Timurid dominion, where Mohammad-Darvish, maternal uncle of Shah Rukh, was Timurid Governor from 1415. The manuscript is still considered as highly representative of early Turkoman style. This style displays the early stages of what is now defined as "Turkman".

Still, the Mihr u Mushtari miniatures seem to be highly indebted to earlier Jalayirid manuscripts, such as the 1386-88 Khamsa of Nizami (British Library, Or.13297), or the 1396 Khamsah of Khvaju Kirmani (British Library, Add 18113), both created in Baghdad: the depictions of Faridun on horseback in Or.13297 (fol. 19a), or the attitude of the Payk groom looking backward in Add 18113 (fol. 85r), are almost exactly reproduced in the 1420 Mihr u Mushtari manuscript.

In 1421, the Timurid ruler Shah Rukh defeated the Qara Qoyunlu ruler Qara Iskander, and briefly occupied the Qara Qoyunlu capital of Tabriz. Baysunghur, the son of Shah Rukh, brought back to Herat a group of Tabrizi artists and calligraphers, formerly working for the Jalayirid Sultan Ahmad Jalayir and in the workshops of Tabriz, whom he installed in Herat to add to his existing artists from Shiraz. The Herat school became the most important school of artists in Iran, merging the two styles. The early Turkman style is markedly different from the style of Herat, although both styles were ultimately derived from the miniature styles developed around 1400 at the courts of Ahmad Jalayir in Tabriz and Baghdad.

=== Development ===
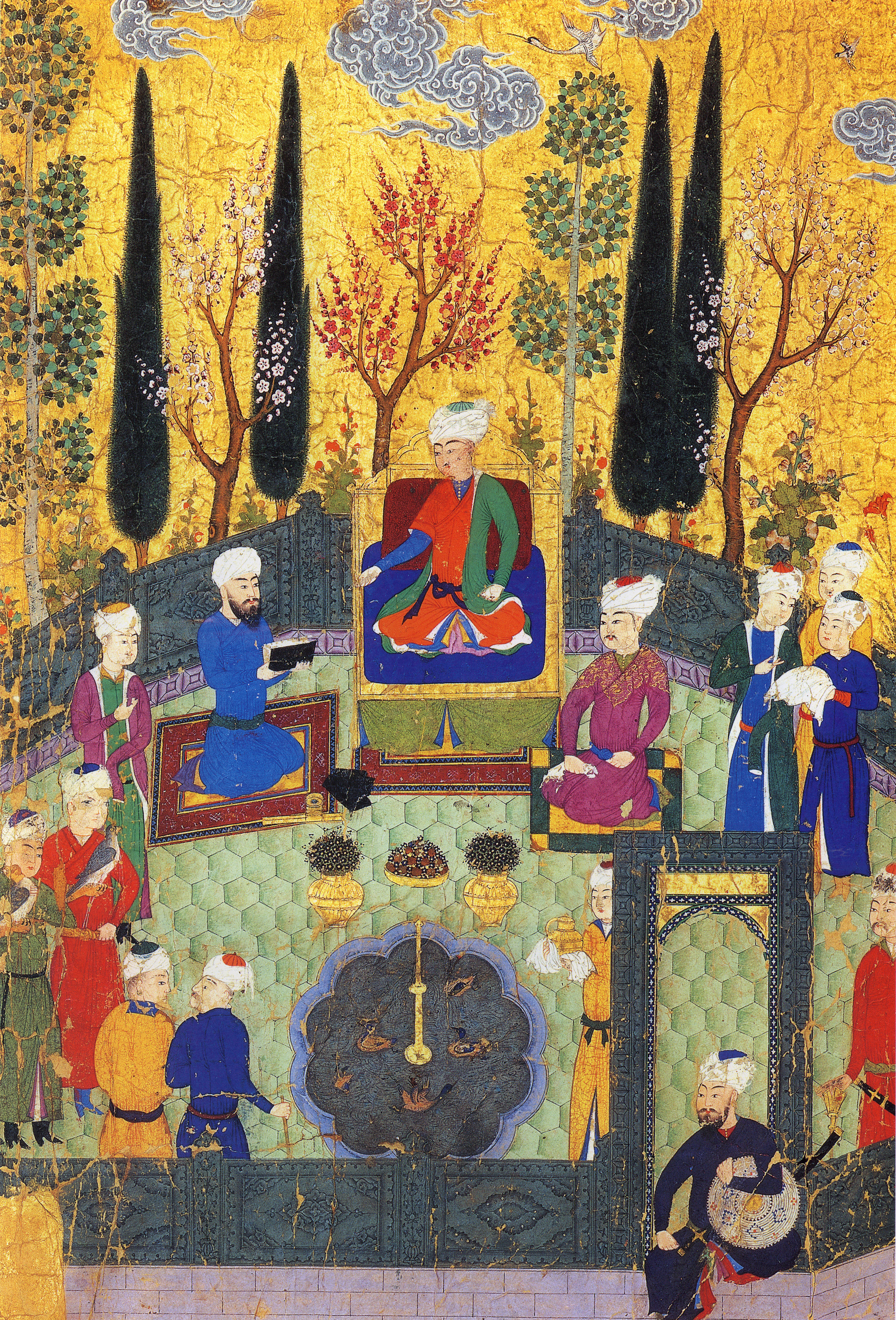
Pir Budaq and his court. Frontispiece from a copy of Kalila wa Dimna of Abu’l-Ma‘ali Nasr Allah. Baghdad (possibly), c. 1465. Gulistan Palace Library, no. 827

The 15th century century represents a key period for the development of pictorial style in the Orient, as the Tabriz school further assimilated and expanded upon the Tabriz-Baghdad Jalayirid tradition of the 14th century, and the Herat Timurid tradition of the 15th century. This hybrid style became an established tradition.

From around 1450, the Turkman style started to use more vibrant palette and dynamic compositions, while at the same time the Herat style evolved towards more structured designs and subtle color palettes. Among the main Qara Qoyunlu rulers, Jahan Shah (r. 1438–1467), unlike his ancestors, cultivated an interest in the arts. He commissioned monuments in a number of Persian cities, notably the Blue Mosque in Tabriz. He was an accomplished poet, writing under the pen name of Haqiqi. His poetry, produced in both Turkish and Persian, demonstrates the divine quality of the word.

His son Pir Budaq, accompanied his father in the 1458 campaign to capture the Timurid capital of Herat. Following the successful Herat campaign, Pir Budaq brought back manuscripts with him, including an unfinished, illustrated manuscript of a famous poem, Khamsa, by Nezami, formerly in the possession of the Herat's deposed ruler. Thereafter, Qara Qyunlu works exhibit a strong influence of Herat painting.

Pir Budaq became Governor of Shiraz from 1458 and later Baghdad from 1460, and commissioned many manuscripts, establishing libraries of high quality works in both places. Under his patronage, a flourishing arts industry developed there. Scholars believe that when Pir Budaq was sent to Baghdad, he took a number of the best illustrators and calligraphers with him. Pir Budaq produced exquisite manuscripts with illumination and illustrations of the finest quality. His preference was for compendia of poetry. Pir Budaq took advantage of the pool of talented calligraphers, illustrators and poets and reinvigorated the arts. Manuscripts produced during Pir Budaq's Baghdad tenure exhibit an "ostentatious use of lapis lazuli and gold". Under his patronage, Baghdad became an important center for the arts, attracting calligraphers and illustrators from around the region. Pir Budaq has been described as one of the earliest of the Turkmen patrons of the arts.

Pir Budaq produced some beautifully illuminated manuscripts such as the Dīvān of Hafiz (1459-60), Shiraz (British Library, Or.11846), which bears a dedication in his name. Some of his illustrated manuscripts include a Khamsa of Amir Khusraw, 1463, Baghdad (Topkapı Sarayı, Revan 1021), characterized by elegant figures and compositions, and showing some influence from Herat. Also of note, a Khamsa of Jamali, 1465, Baghdad (British Library, IO Islamic 138), and a Khamsa of Nizami, 1461, Baghdad (Topkapi Palace Museum, H.761), also produced in Baghdad.

=== Turkman style in Egypt ===
After the death of Pir Budaq in 1465, Turkoman style started to appear in Cairo, capital of the Mamluk Sultanate. This suggests that some of Pir Budaq's artists from his Baghdad atelier dispersed to some extent and sought new patrons in the Mamluk realm.

== Aq Qoyunlu creations (1468–1508) ==
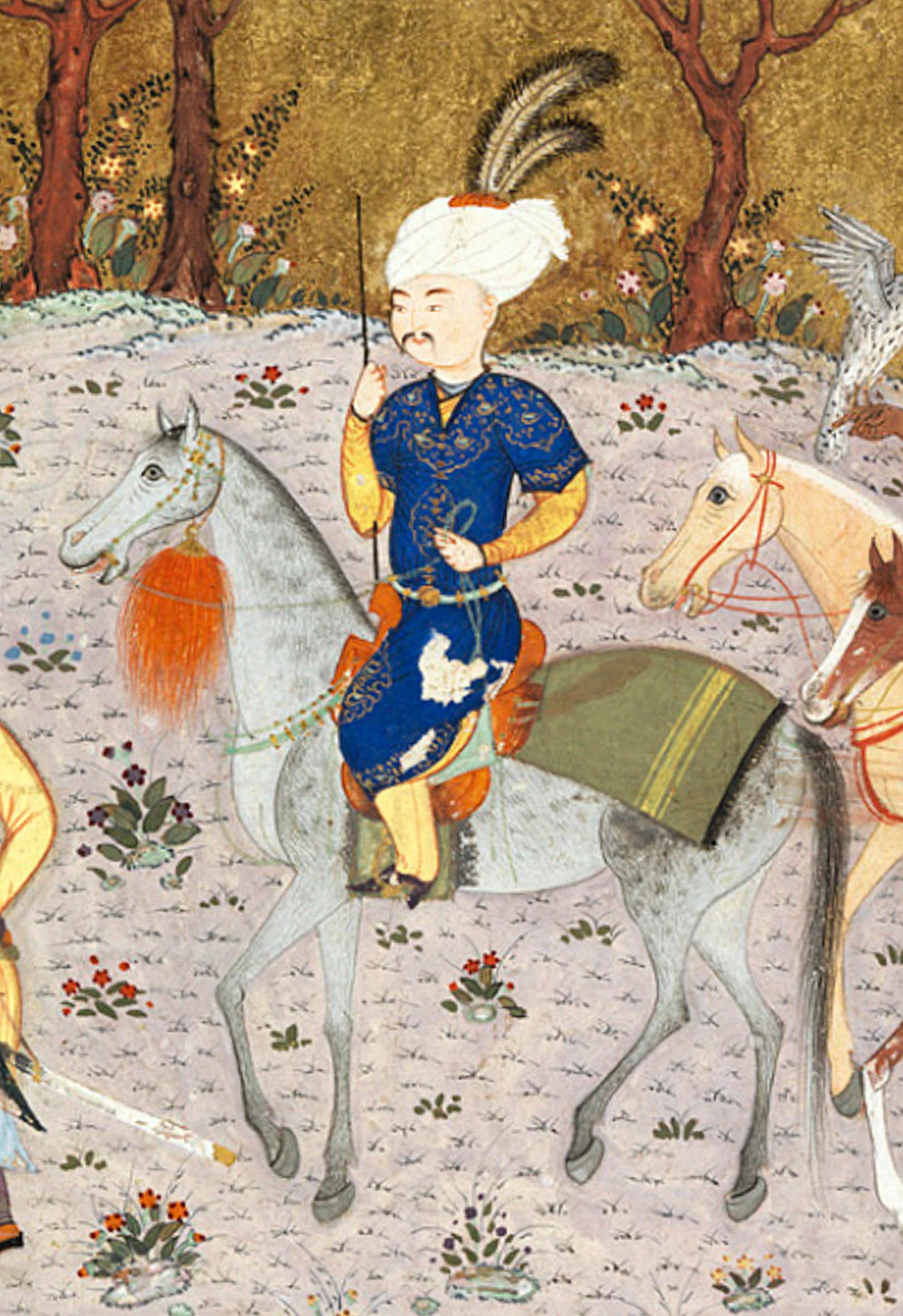
Contemporary depiction of Sultan Khalil, in a miniature from the manuscript of Divan of Hidayat (1478). Chester Beatty Library (MS 401).

The Aq Qoyunlu adopted to a large extent the Herat-inspired tradition of Pir Budaq, during a period from 1468 and 1478. In Aq Qoyunlu miniatures, figures tend to be depicted with round and rather childish faces, tiny feet and turbans set high on the head. One example of such manuscripts is the Annals of al-Tabari (Dublin, Chester Beatty Lib., MS. 144), as well as a famous double-page frontispiece though to depict the Aq Qoyunlu ruler Uzun Hasan (r. 1453–78) hunting: the Hunting Sultan Uzun Hasan diptych inserted into a later copy of the Silsilat al-dhahab ("Chain of Gold").

Sultan Khalil (ruled 1478) appears in an exquisite illustrated manuscript of the Divan (Collected Works) of Hidayat, 1478 (CBL, T 401), a diwān by the poet Hidayat, written in Azarbayjani Turkish. The manuscript contains several depictions of Khalil during various activities, such as holding court in a garden, giving audience from his palace balcony, on a hawking expedition, and relaxing in a vinery. It displays typical Turkman figures with small rounded faces.

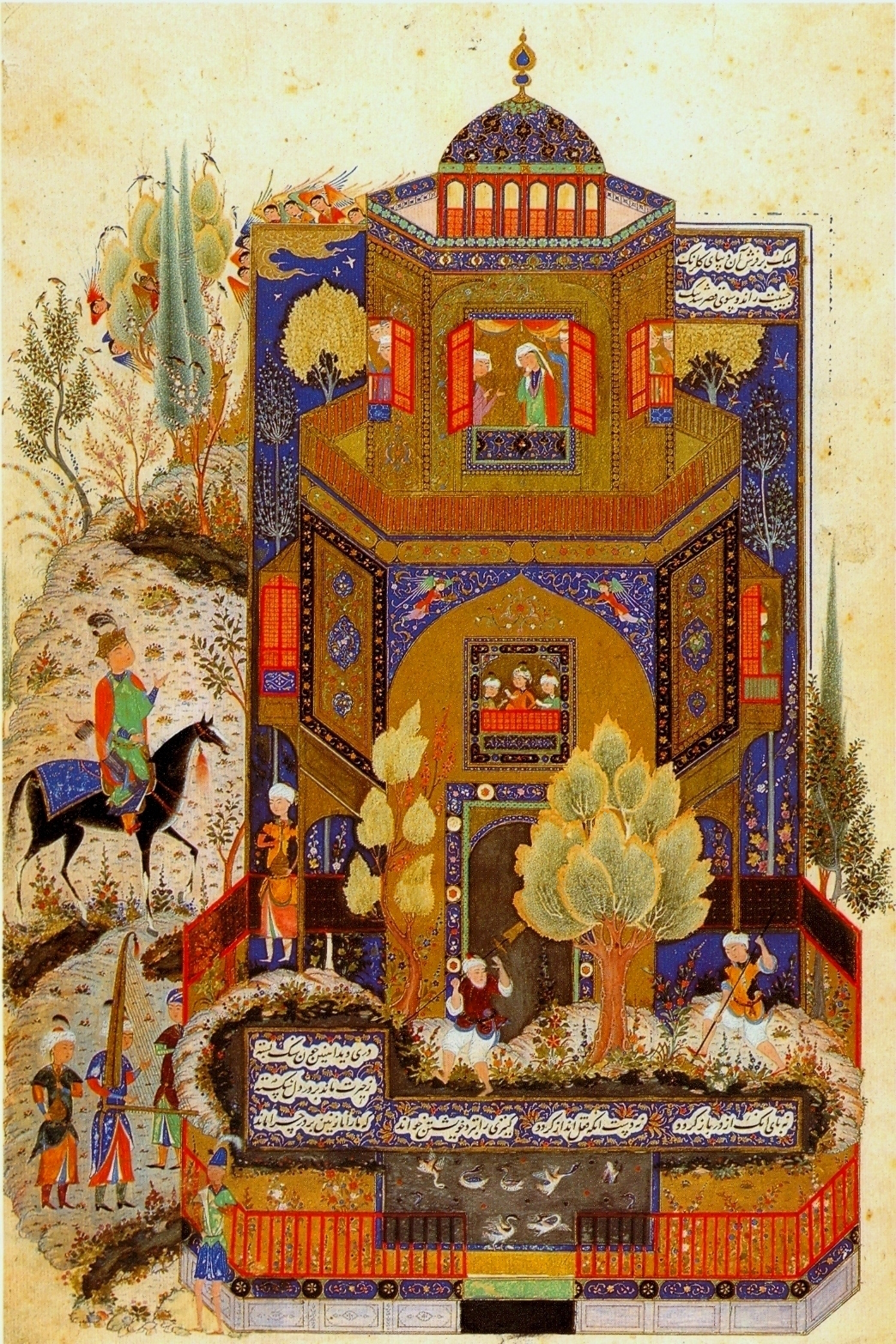
The celebrated Hasht Behesht ("Eight Paradises") Palace in Tabriz was started by Uzun Hasan and completed by his son Yaqub Beg. Khamsa of Nizami (Tabriz, 1481), commissioned by Yaqub Beg.

Sultan Yaqub (r.1478–1490) commissioned numerous manuscripts with lavish miniatures, such as the Khamsa of Nizami (Tabriz, 1481), considered as "the supreme and ultimate fruit of his artistic patronage", the Ya'qub Beg Album or the more popular Khavaran-nama. Yaqub Beg employed two main master miniaturists, Shaykhi and Darvish Muhammad, for the illustrations of his manuscripts. The pictorial style has been qualified as having "ecstatic intensity". One of the most famous miniatures added by Yaqub Beg is the Bahram Gur in the Green Pavilion, painted by the Herat artist Shaykhi. Compared to the balanced Timurid Herat style of Bihzad for example, this miniature style uses a much more intense color palette, with acid greens and vivid blues, and abundant vegetation that seems to engulf the protagonists.

Another famous painting created under the patronage of Yaqub Beg is Khosrow under the windows of Shirin, depicting the Classical composition of the romantic scene between Khosrow and Shirin, on the location of the Hasht Behesht Palace, a palace started by Uzun Hasan and completed by his son Yaqub Beg in the Aq Qoyunlu capital Tabriz.

A Shahnama (1482) created in Shiraz, uses simplified and balanced depictions, with a vigorous and vivid character, characteristic of Aq Qoyunlu productions in this southern area.

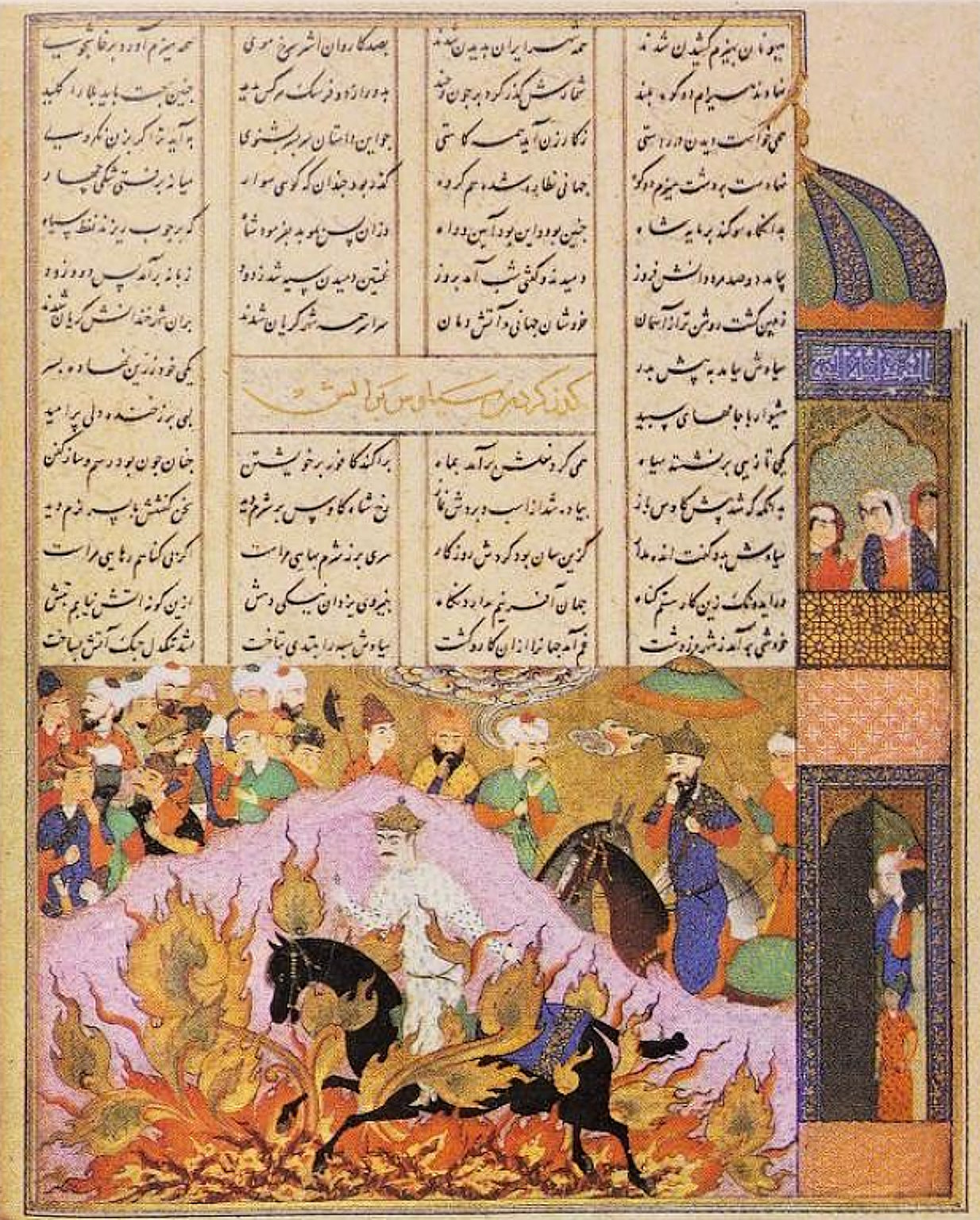
The fire ordeal of Siyavush.Shāhnāma (1486), British Library Add. 18188.

Turkmen artists were generally prompt to experiment with new ideas, including Chinese ones or the works of Muhammad Siyah Qalam, in contrast with the more timid style of the Timurid court. A Makhzan al-asrar dated to 1478 in Tabriz, written in Chaghatai, used Chinese-style dyed robin egg blue speckled with gold, and painted Chinese landscapes with flowering trees. Another characteristic of Turkmen miniatures, and particularly those of Shaykhi, compared to Timurid ones, is the rise of single-sheet illustrations, meaning that many paintings were no longer devoted to simply illustrating a given text, but were stand-alone artistic endeavours, creating images "of epic size and ambition". Besides these miniatures in fine court style, there was also a quantity of more prosaic contemporary illustrated manuscripts, using a simpler and more stereotypical artistic idiom, belonging to the "Turkoman Commercial" style, and often centered around the city of Shiraz.

=== Metropolitan or royal Turkman style ===
The metropolitan or royal Turkman style is characterized by its quality, as appears particularly well in a Shāhnāma (1486). The action described in the miniatures is lively and the colors are flamboyant and warm. The clouds are multicolored, set against a golden sky. Lively crowds of men and boys appear to participate eagerly to the action. Fires are depicted with red and orange tips, rather similar to dragons wings, surrounding a crimson and scarlet core. The domes of building are richly decorated with gold-leaf sprays.

== Early Safavid adoption of Turkman style (1500–1545) ==
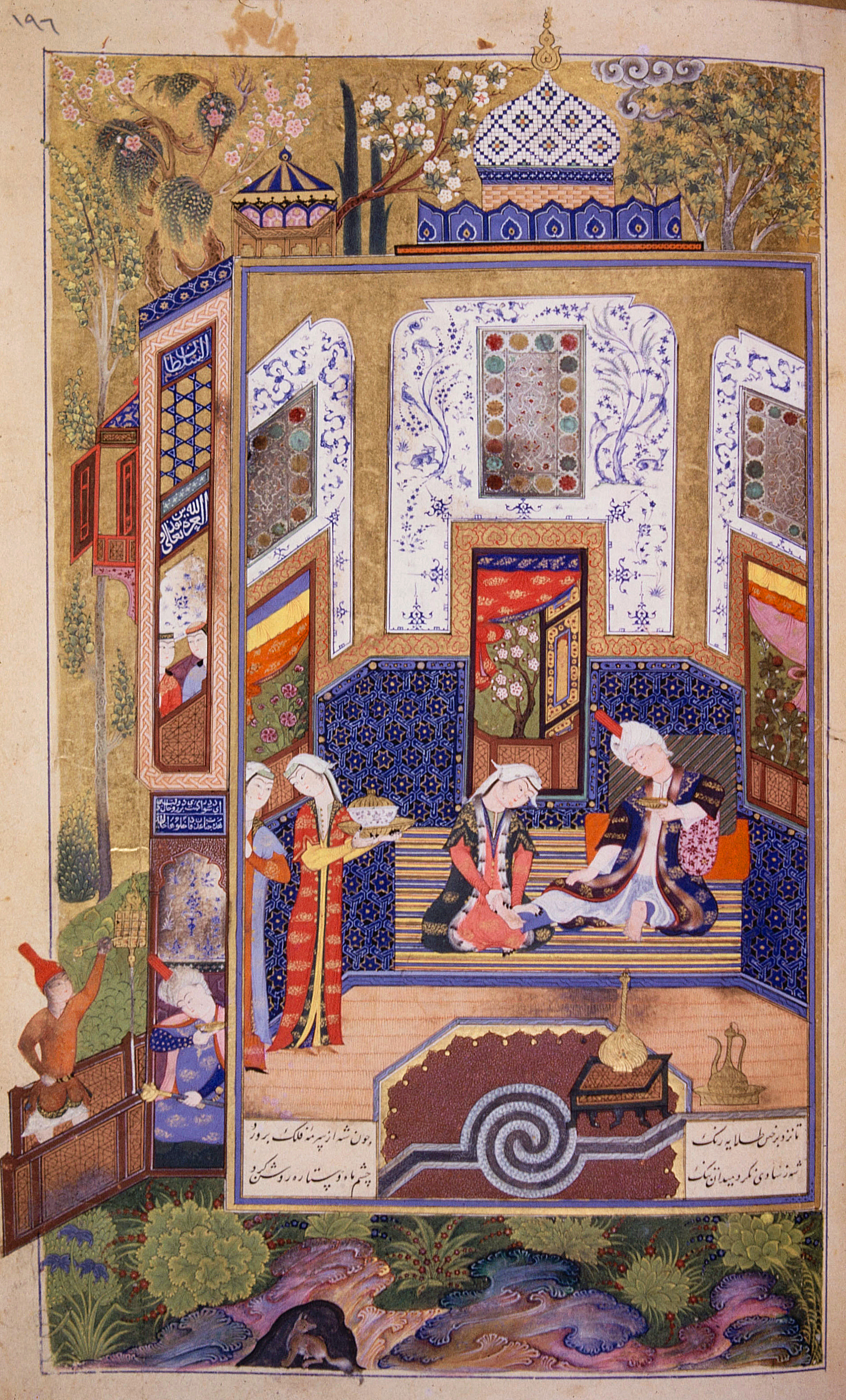
Bahram Gur in the White Pavilion, Khamsa of Nizami (Topkapi H. 762). Tabriz, added under Shah Ismail circa 1505

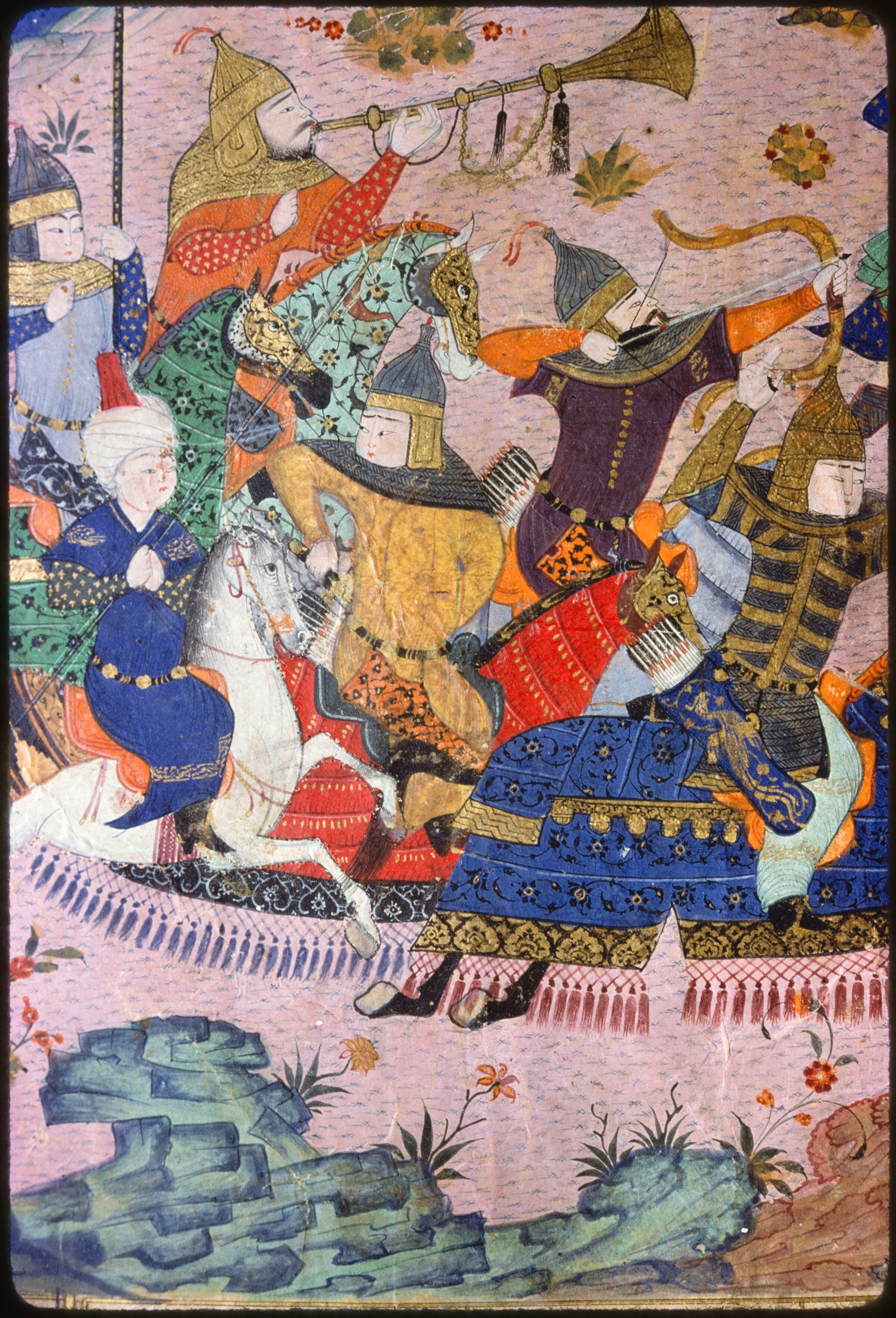
Cavalry charge with horseman wearing the Taj-e Haydari. Dastan-i Jamal u Jalal, commissioned under Shah Ismail in 1502–1505, Tabriz.

The Turkman style would progressively vanish under the Safavid Empire in the 16th-century, followed by a new painting style emerged to take its place. Still, early Safavid paintings in the wake of the rise of Shah Ismail I in 1501 in Tabriz retained for a large part the Turkman style. The flamboyant colors of royal Turkman style combined with the clean compositions and cool colors of the Herat style to define the remarkable painting of Tabriz in 1520-45.

The romantic poem Dastan-i Jamal u Jalal by Asafi was commissioned in 1503-04, and while depicting the newly introduced Safavid red Taj-e Haydari, also retained "the swashbuckling metropolitan Turkman style, distinguishable by its windswept trees, swirling clouds, landscapes filled with flowering plants, gloriously decorated architecture and exquisite designs on carpets and canopies", with vivid warm colors and lively depictions. This is also the case of the group of Safavid miniatures added by Ismail I to the Khamsa of Nizami (Topkapı Sarayı Revan 762) in 1505.

The predilection for delicate colors, rocks ornamented by faces, detailed depictions of tiger skins, windblown trees surmounted by golden skies with blue clouds continued into the 1520s, while artists from Herat started to join the Tabriz studios following the death of Timurid Sultan Husayn Bayqara in 1506. This fusion of Turkman and Herat styles led to the development of highly decorative and romantic paintings.

Later Safavid illustrated manuscripts such as the Shāhnāmah Shāh Ismaʿīl (Tabriz, 1541) indicate by their lively style the significant persistence of the Turkoman element in the creations of Tabriz at such later date. This period corresponds to the beginnings of the original Safavid miniature style, which would last into the 18th century.

== Sources ==
- Hasanzade, Jamila; Goyushov, Nasib; Vasilyeva, Olga; Yastrebova, Olga (2021). The Magic of the Pen: Selected Miniatures from the Khamsa of Nizami Ganjavi (PDF). Boyut Publishing Group / Ones Media. ISBN 978-9952-8413-5-0.
- Hayashi, Norihito (2012). "The Turkman Commercial Style of Painting". Orient. 47: 169–190.
- Titley, Norah (1978). "A Khamsa of Nizami Dated Herat, 1421". The British Library Journal. 4 (2): 161–186.
