= Khamsa of Nizami (British Library, Or.13297) =

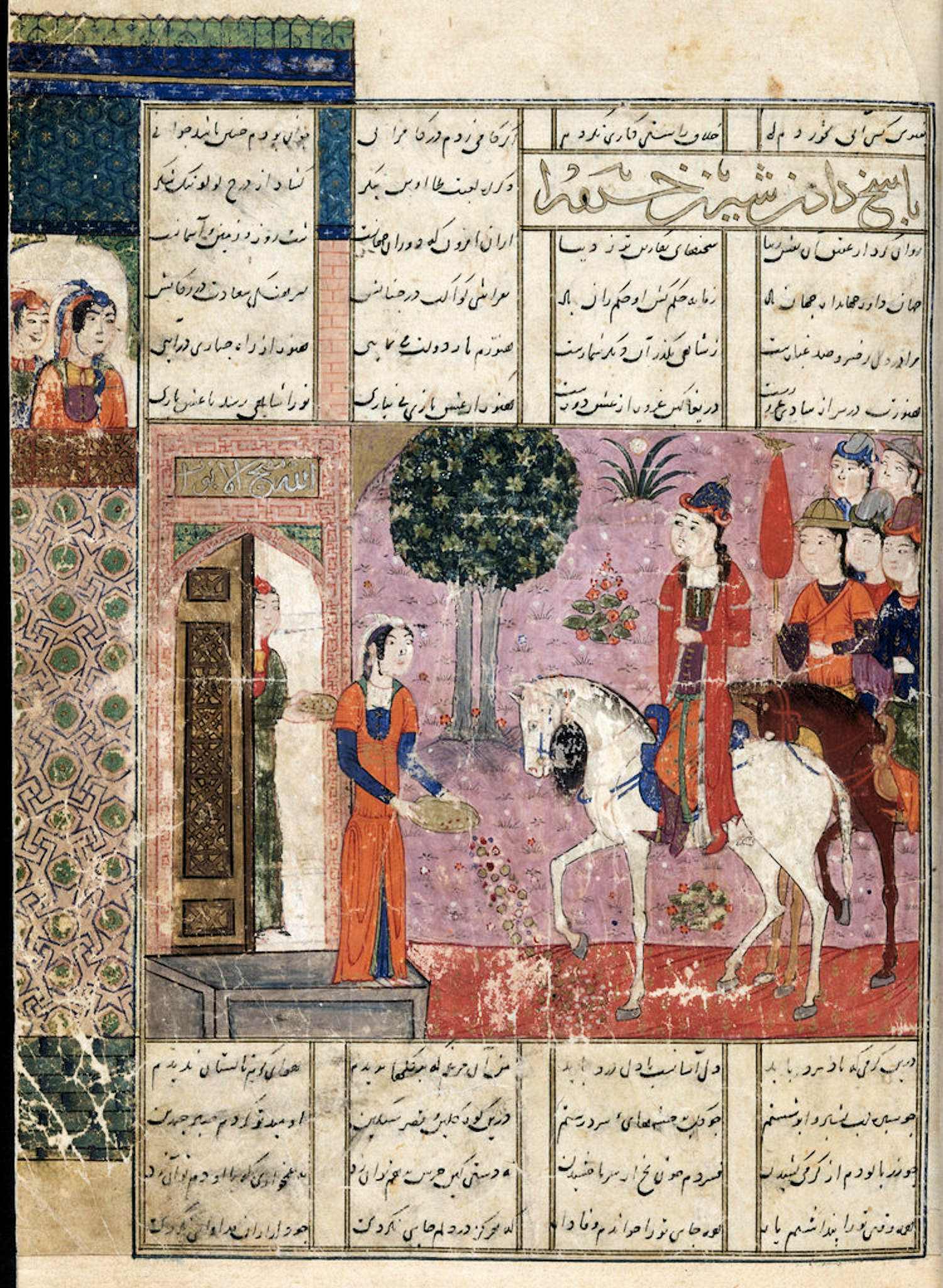
- Khusrau at Shirin's castle in the earliest known illustrated Khamsa of Nizami: the Jalayirid manuscript British Library, Or.13297, created in Baghdad in 1386–88.
- Language: Persian
- Subject: Romantic stories
- Publication date: 1386-88
- Publication place: Jalayirid Sultanate
- Media type: Manuscript

The Khamsa of Nizami (British Library, Or.13297) is the earliest definitely dated illustrated copy of the Khamsa of Nizami. It was created in 1386–88 in Baghdad, for Sultan Ahmad Jalayir of the Mongol Jalayirid Sultanate. It is a little-known but iconographically and stylistically significant manuscript.

The main manuscript workshop of Sultan Ahmad Jalayir was in Baghdad, but he also had artists and scribes working for him in Tabriz. The miniatures of Or.13297 are comparatively simple, but pave the way for the highest refinement of the miniatures of manuscript Add.18113, dated Baghdad 1396.

The Jalayirid Sultanate at the beginning of rule of Sultan Ahmad Jalayir experimented with some of the most significant evolutions in the literature of the period, moving from the monumental and epic character of the Shahmanahs towards more romantic and poetic illustrated manuscripts. The Khamsa of Nizami (British Library, Or.13297), being the earliest known illustrated copy of the Khamsa of Nizami is pivotal in this evolution. A few years later, the 1396 Khamsah of Khvaju Kirmani (British Library, Add 18113), also created in Baghdad by the Jalayirids, already reached some of the highest artistic levels, with full-page romantic art.

The Khamsa of Nizami (British Library, Or.13297) is followed by a slightly later Jalayirid manuscript, Khamsa of Nizami. Circa 1400, Tabriz (Freer Galery of Art, F1931.29).

After the death of Sultan Ahmad Jalayir, some artist stayed in Tabriz, but others leaved for Isfahan and Shiraz, to work for another famous patron and bibliophile, the Timurid governor Iskandar Sultan, ruler of Fars from 1409 to 1414.

The Mihr u Mushtari (1419) miniatures, which are generally considered as the first instance of Turkman style, seem to be highly indebted to earlier Jalayirid manuscripts, such as the 1386-88 Khamsa of Nizami (British Library, Or.13297), or the 1396 Khamsah of Khvaju Kirmani (British Library, Add 18113), both created in Baghdad: the depictions of Faridun on horseback in Or.13297 (fol. 19a), or the attitude of the Payk groom looking backward in Add 18113 (fol. 85r), are almost exactly reproduced in the 1419-20 Mihr u Mushtari manuscript.

Another contemporary or possibly slightly earlier version of the Khamsa of Nizami in provincial style, is a copy from southern Iran (likely Muzaffarid), Khamsa of Nizami (Tehran University Central Library, MS. 5179) with miniatures unsecurely dated ca.1380, in a manuscript dated 1318.

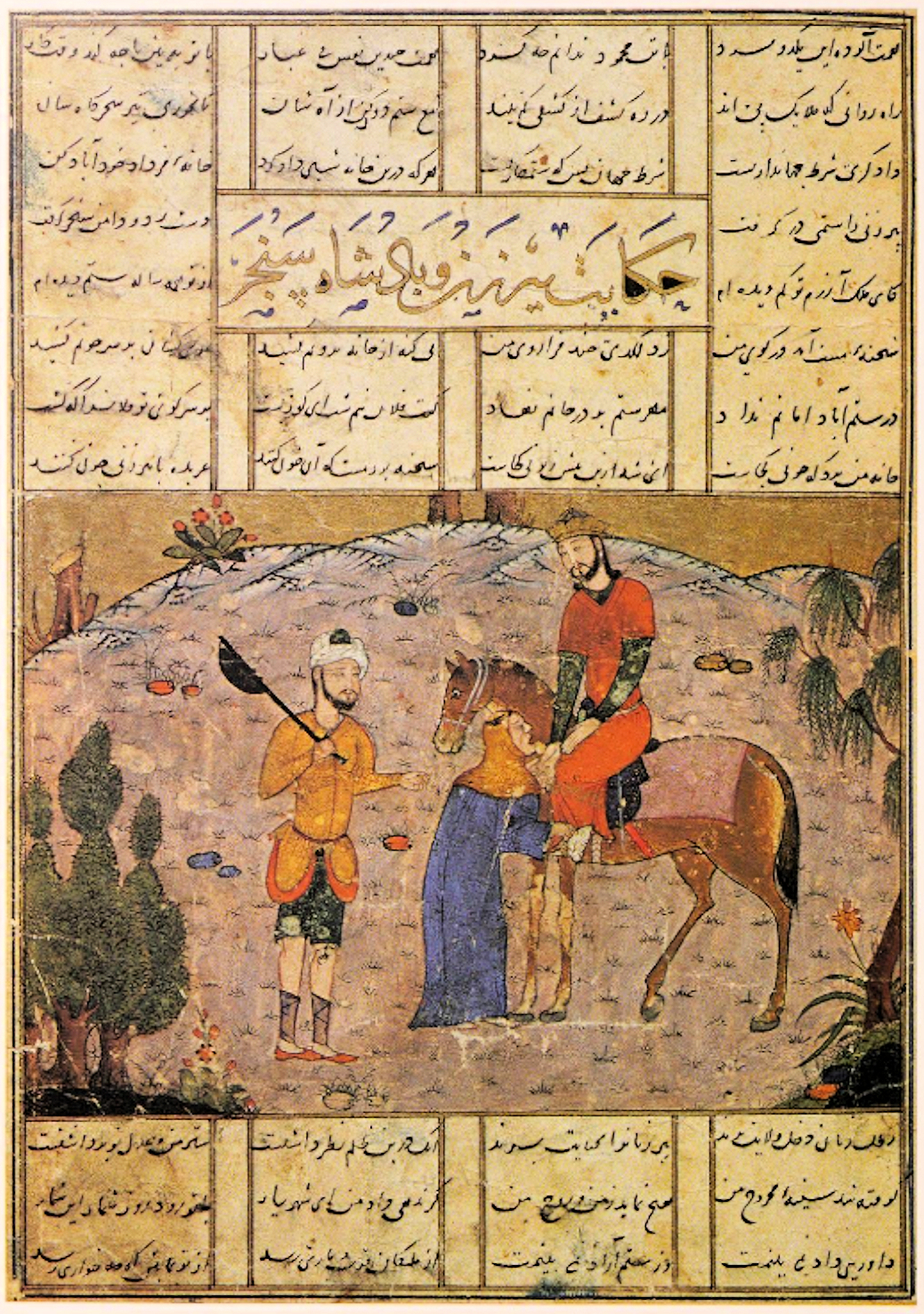
Sultan Sanjar and the old woman, accompanied by a payk groom

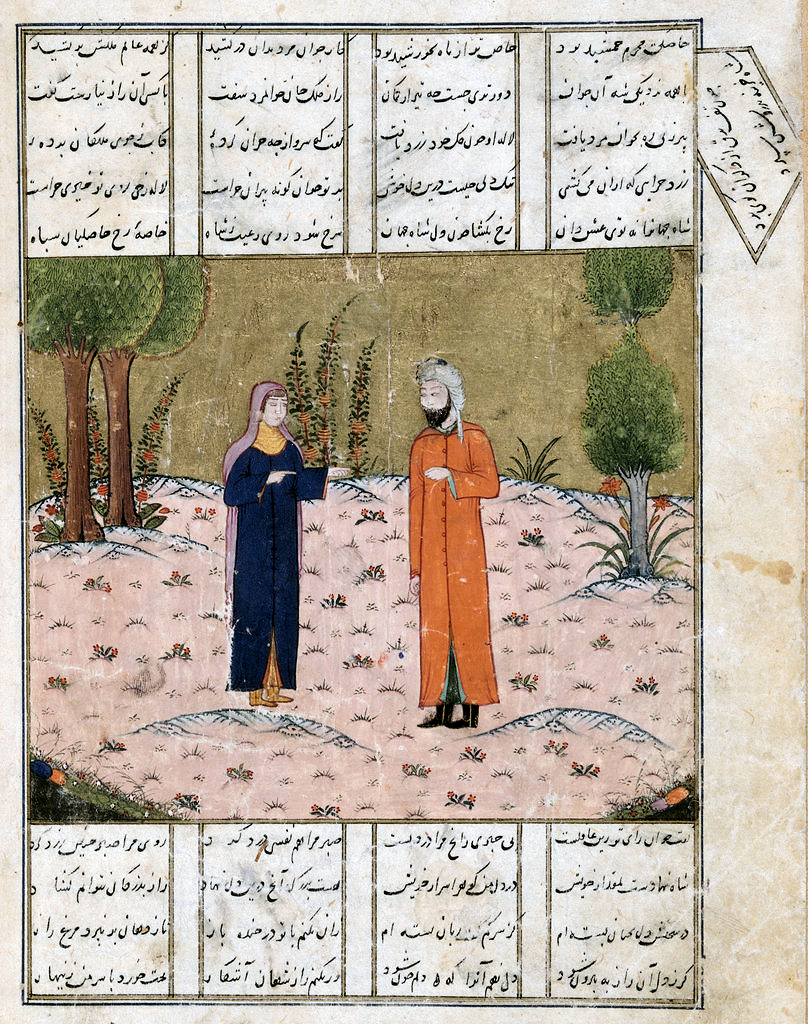
The youth to whom Jamshid entrusted his secrets consults an old woman (f.28v)

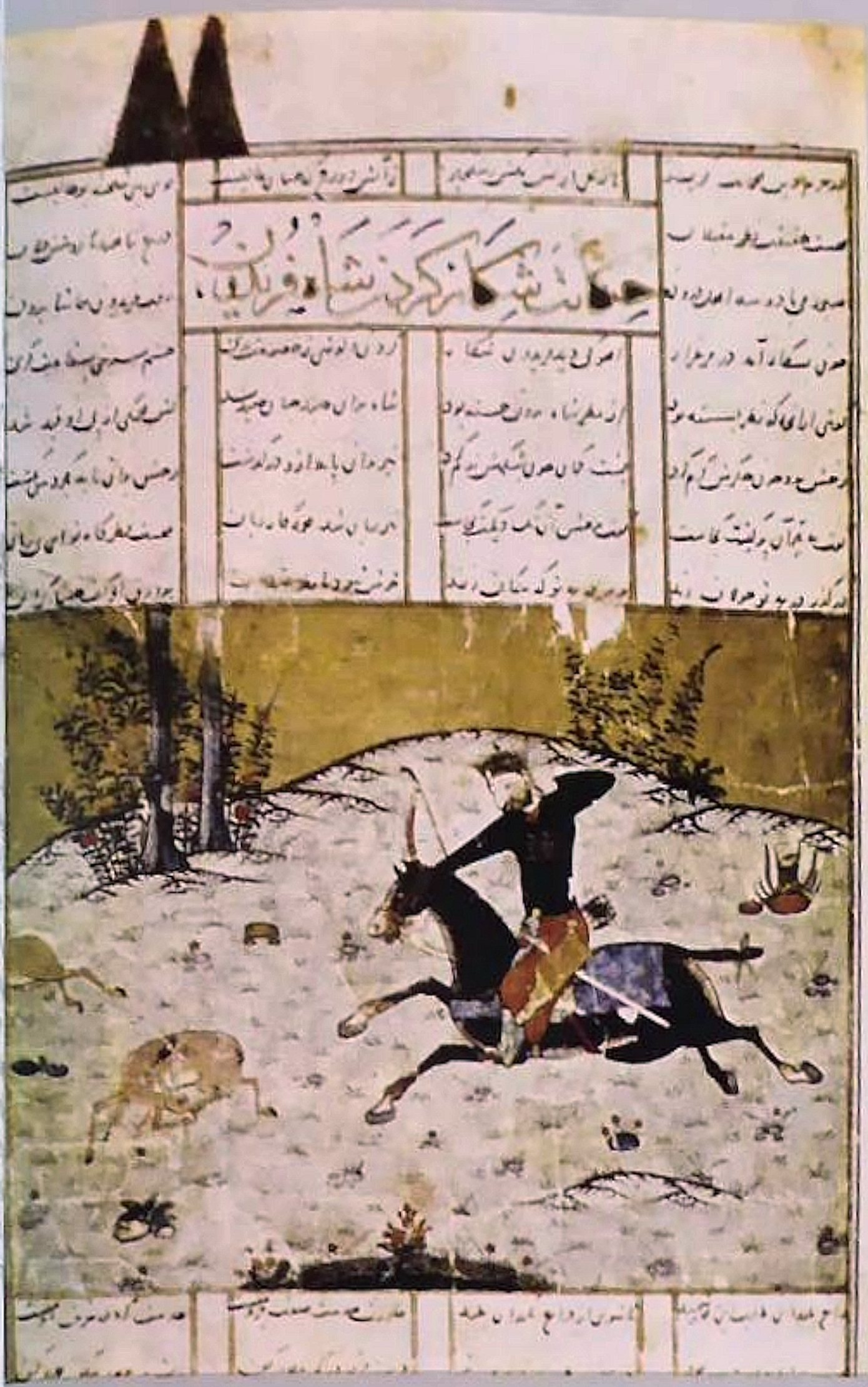
Faridun and the gazelle (fol. 19a)

== See also ==
- Persian miniature

== Sources ==
- Graves, Margaret S. (1 January 2002). "Words and Pictures". Persica. 18 (0): 17–54. doi:10.2143/PERS.18.0.491.
- Titley, Norah (1978). "A Khamsa of Nizami Dated Herat, 1421". The British Library Journal. 4 (2): 161–186.
