= Khamsa of Nizami =

Set of five poems by Nizami

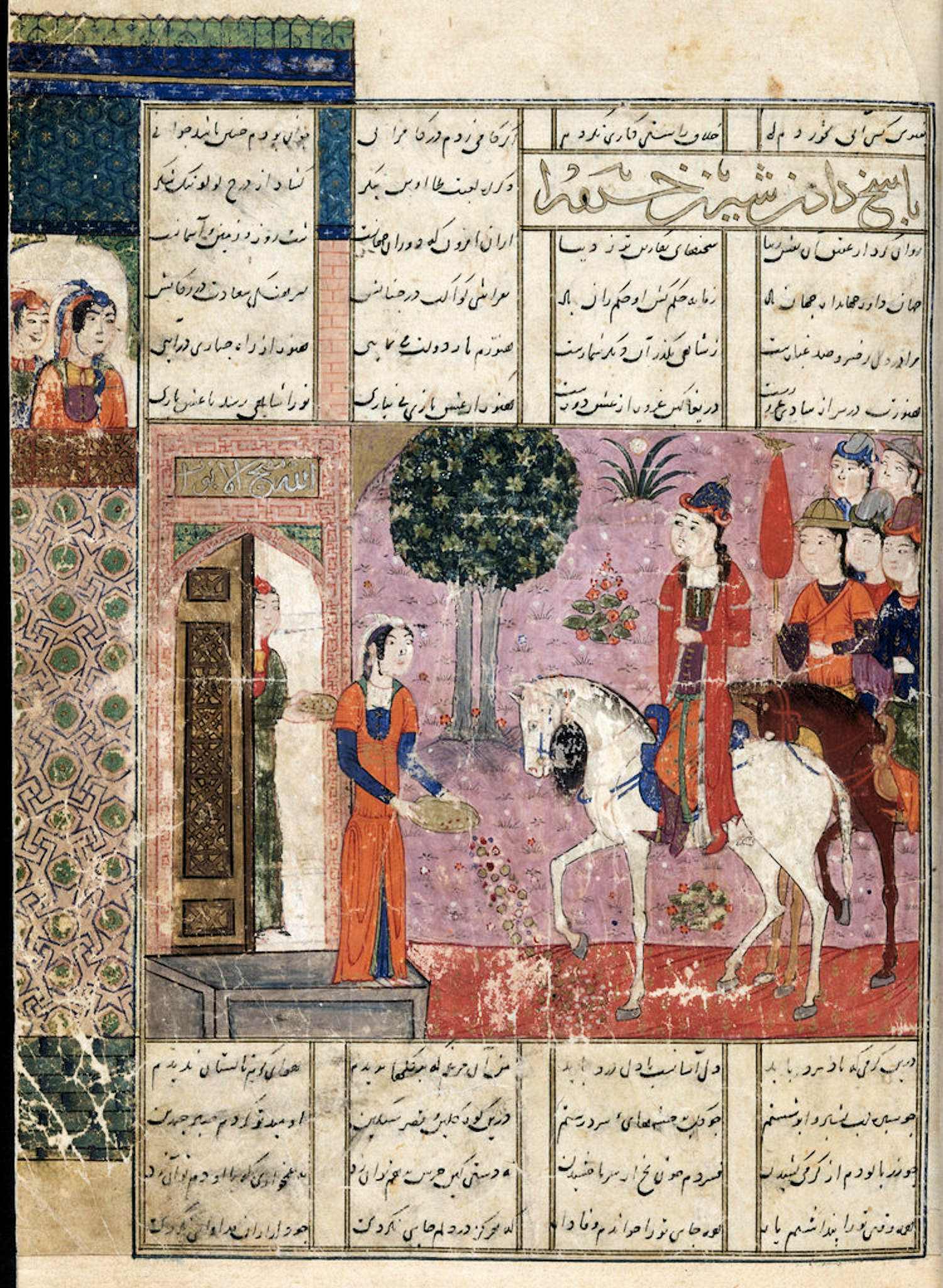
The earliest known illustrated Khamsa of Nizami: the Jalayirid manuscript British Library, Or.13297, created in Baghdad in 1386-88.

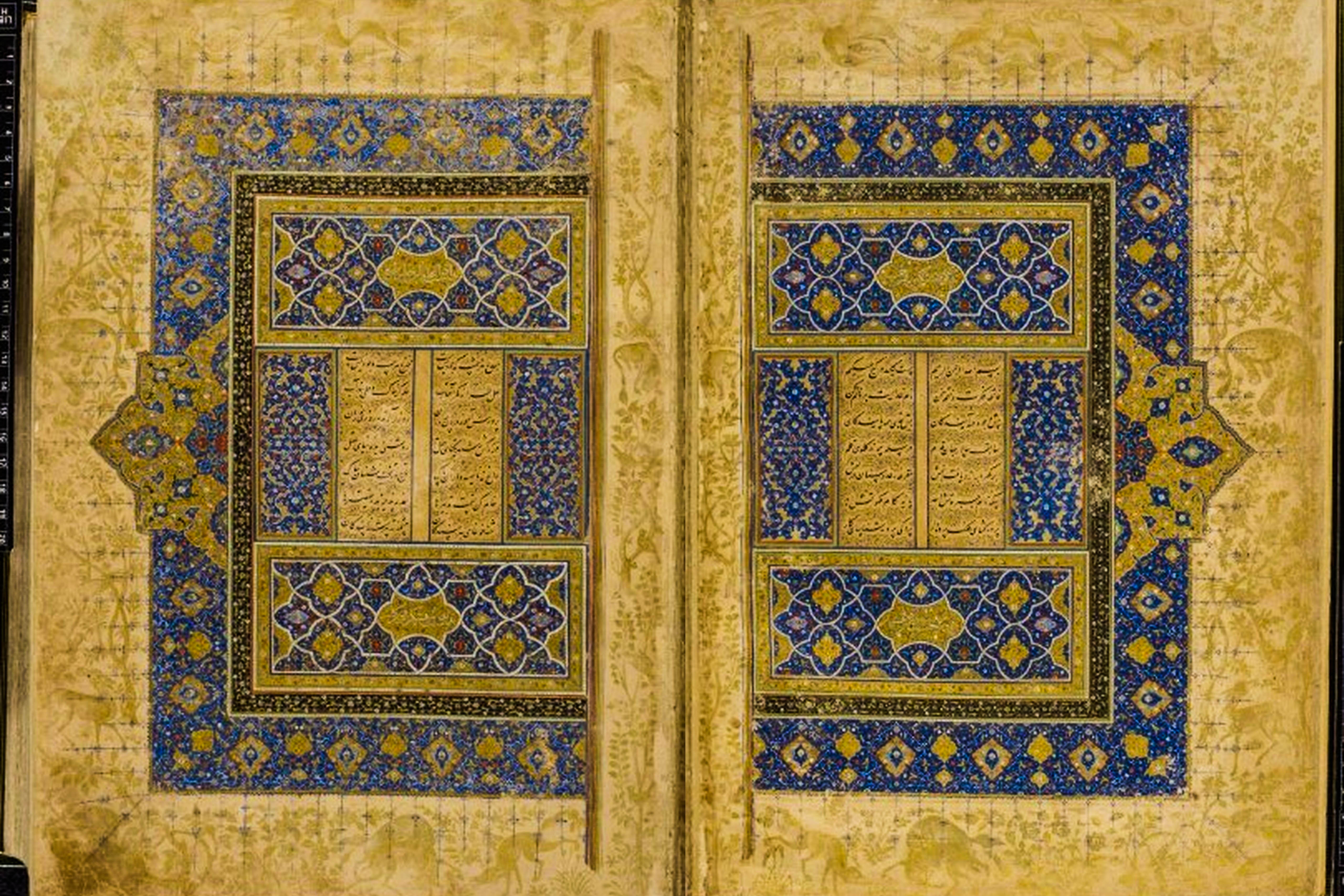
Opening of a manuscript of Nizami's Khamsa, British Library. Dated 1535-43

The Khamsa (Persian: خمسه, 'Quintet' or 'Quinary', from Arabic) or Panj Ganj (Persian: پنج گنج, 'Five Treasures') is the main and best known work of Nizami Ganjavi.

== Description ==
The Khamsa is in five long narrative poems:

- Makhzan-ol-Asrâr (مخزن‌الاسرار, 'The Treasury or Storehouse of Mysteries'), 1163 (some date it 1176)
- Khosrow o Shirin (خسرو و شیرین, 'Khosrow and Shirin'), 1177–1180
- Leyli o Majnun (لیلی و مجنون, 'Layla and Majnun'), 1192
- Eskandar-Nâmeh (اسکندرنامه, 'The Book of Alexander'), 1194 or 1196–1202
- Haft Peykar (هفت پیکر, 'The Seven Beauties'), 1197

The first of these poems, Makhzan-ol-Asrâr, was influenced by Sanai's (d. 1131) monumental Garden of Truth. The four other poems are medieval romances. Khosrow and Shirin, Bahram-e Gur, and Alexander the Great, who all have episodes devoted to them in Ferdowsi's Shahnameh, appear again here at the center of three of four of Nezami's narrative poems. The adventure of the paired lovers, Layla and Majnun, is the subject of the second of his four romances, and derived from Arabic sources. In all these cases, Nezami reworked the material from his sources in a substantial way.

The Khamsa was a popular subject for lavish manuscripts illustrated with painted miniatures at the Turkic, Persian and Mughal courts in later centuries. Examples include the earliest known illustrated Khamsa of Nizami, the Jalayirid manuscript Khamsa of Nizami (British Library, Or.13297) created in Baghdad in 1386-88, the Khamsa of Nizami (Tabriz, 1481) commissioned by the Aq Qoyunlu Yaqub Beg, or the Khamsa of Nizami (British Library, Or. 12208), created for the Mughal Emperor Akbar in the 1590s. A Khamsa manuscript created for Prince Aurangzeb, the sixth Mughal emperor, is now in the Khalili Collection of Islamic Art. Its illustrations of Bahram Gur depict the character as Aurangzeb.

== Gallery ==
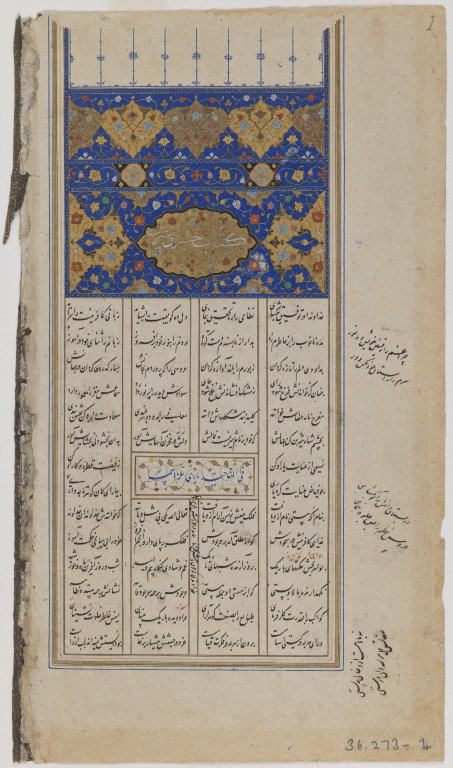
Page from an Illustrated Manuscript of the "Khamsa" by Nizami. Brooklyn Museum.

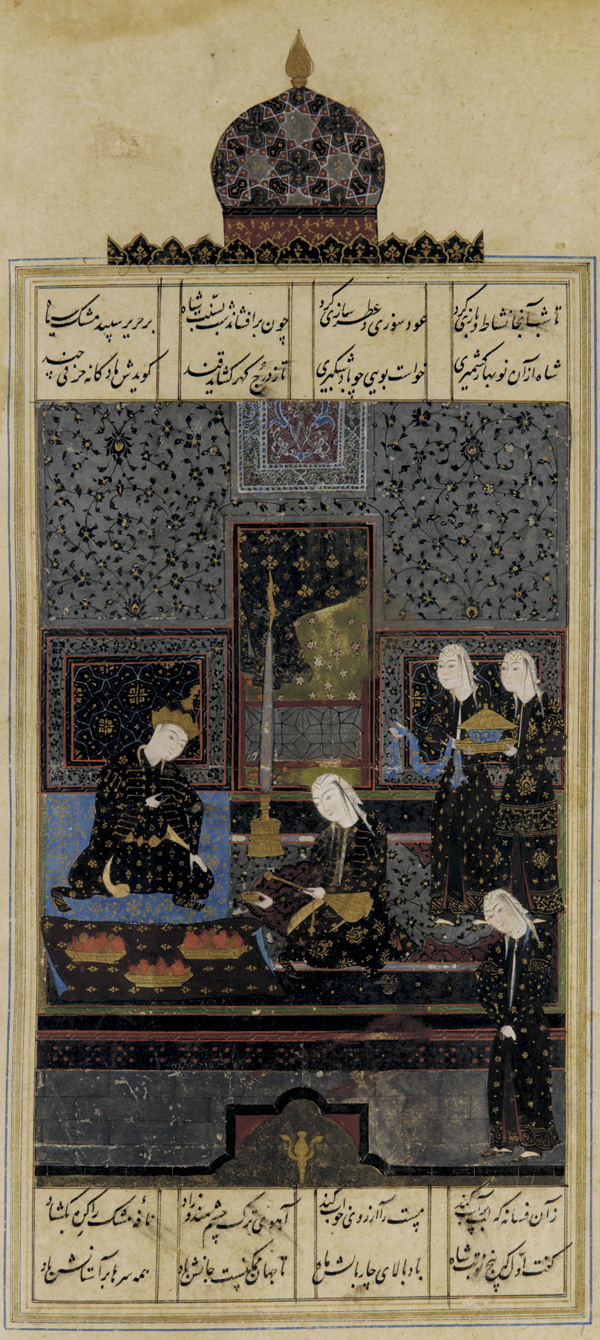
Sassanid king, Bahram Gur is a great favourite in Persian tradition and poetry. Depiction of Nezami's "Bahram and the Indian Princess in the Black Pavilion", Khamsa, mid-16th century Safavid era.

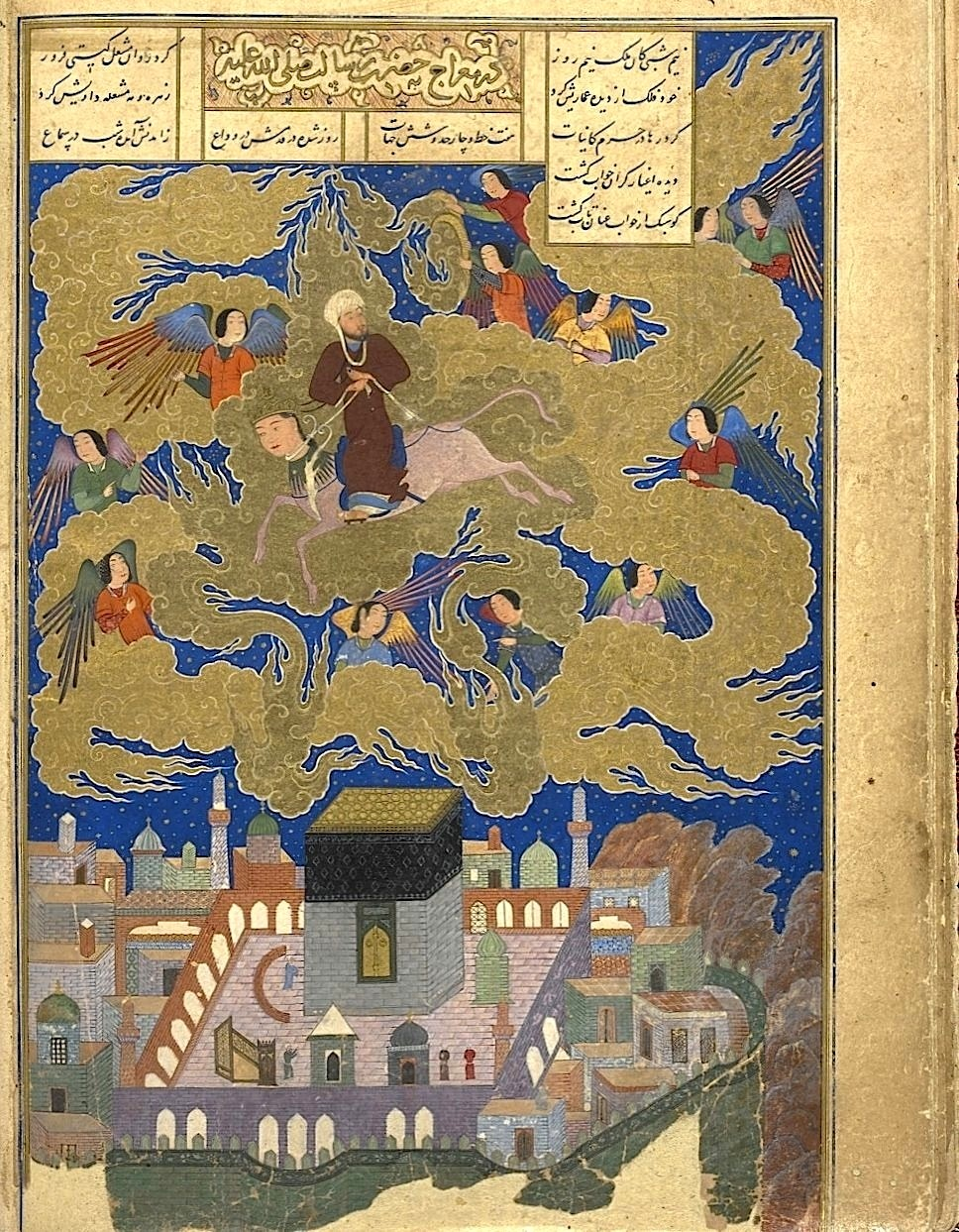
A manuscript from Nizami's Khamsa dated 1494, depicting Muhammad's journey from Mecca to the Dome of the Rock to heaven. The archangel Gabriel is seen to Muhammad's right with multiple wings.

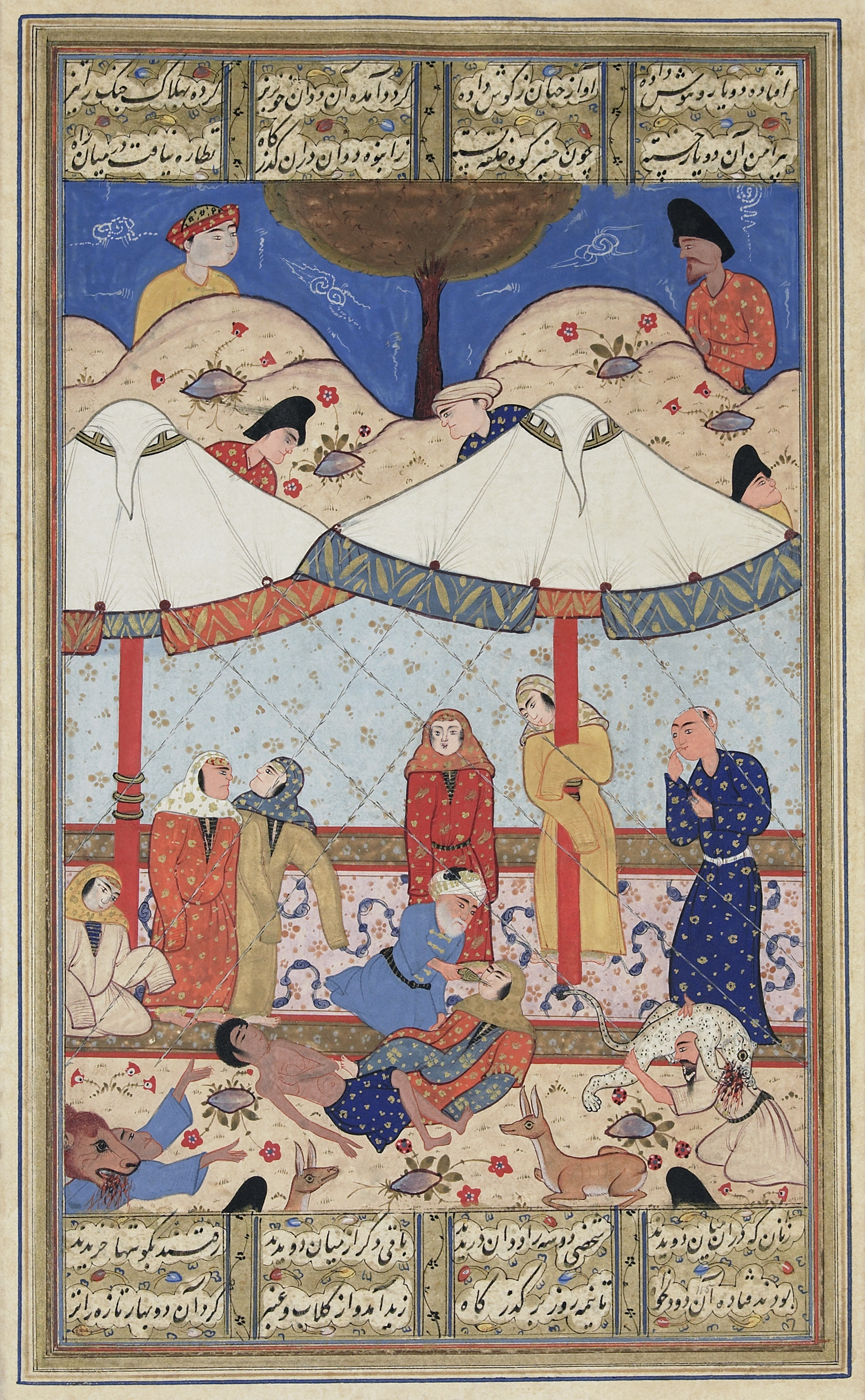
A scene from the romance "Layla and Majnun". The thwarted lovers meet for the last time before their deaths. Both have fainted and Majnun's elderly messenger attempts to revive Layla while wild animals protect the pair from unwelcome intruders. Late 16th-century illustration.

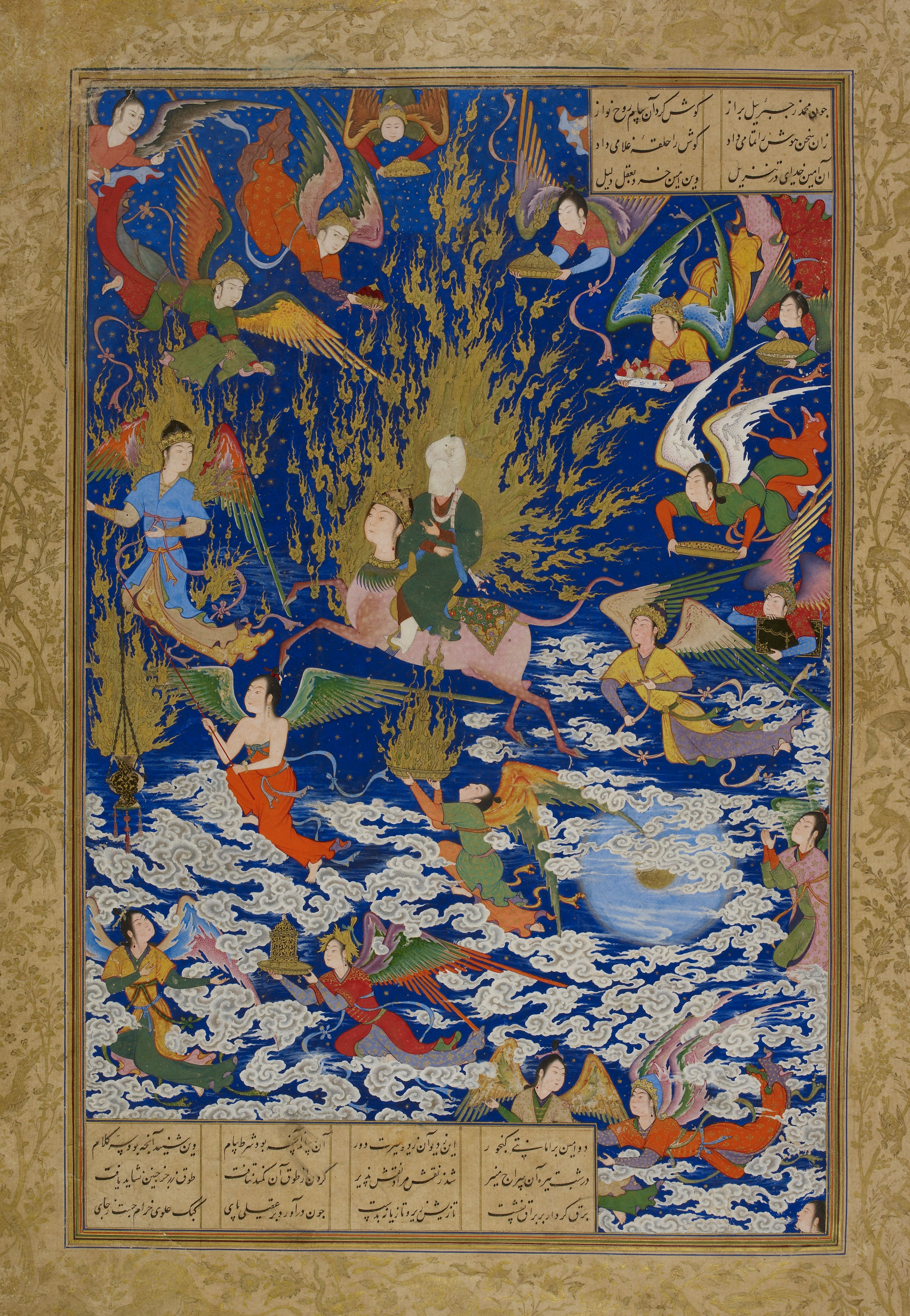
1543 illustration of the Mi'raj from the Khamsa, probably created by the court painter Sultan Muhammad. This version was created for the Persian Shah Tahmasp I.

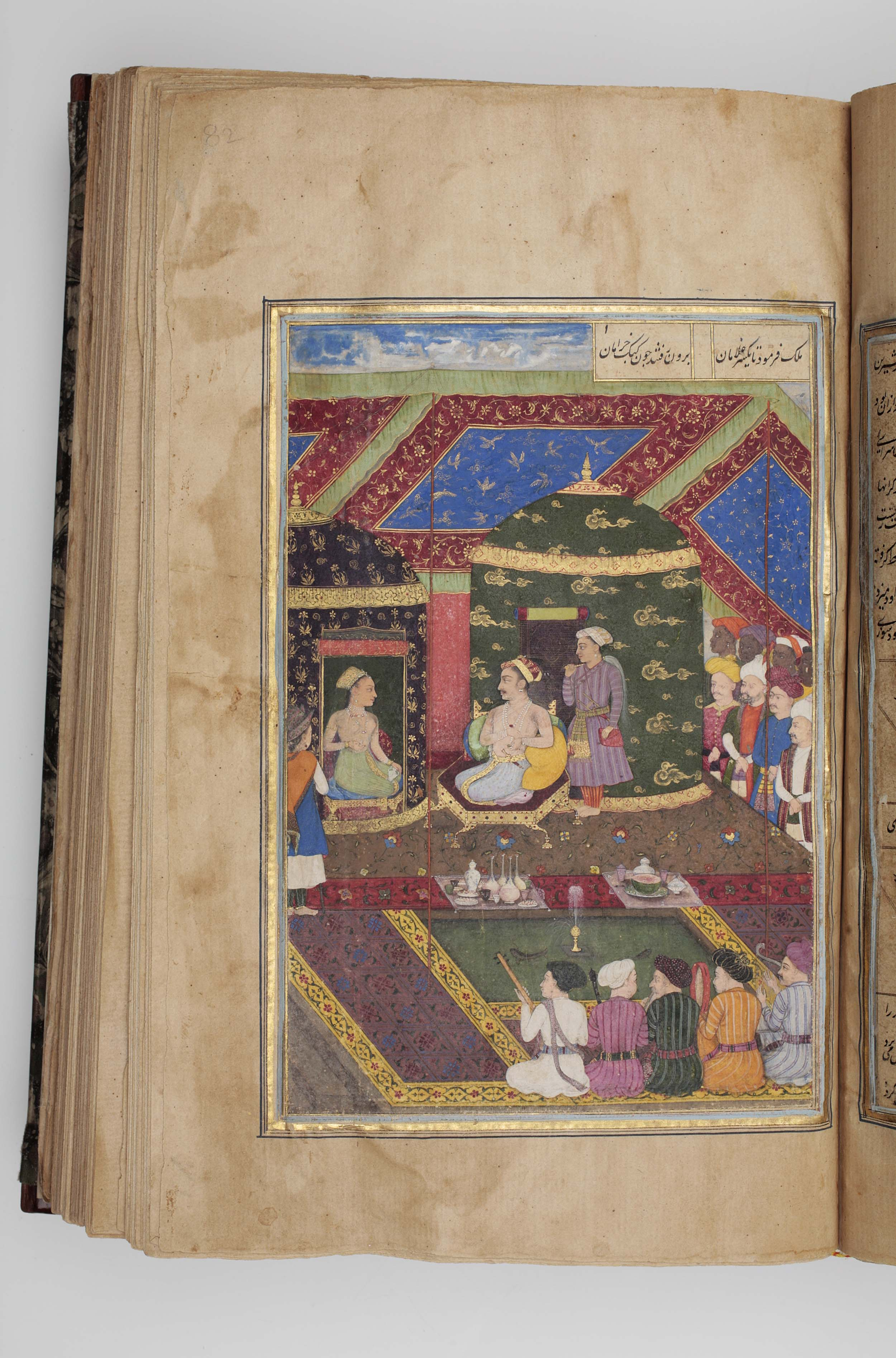
Khosrow and Shirin meet, illustration from Prince Aurangzeb's Khamsa, 1640s

== See also ==
- Khamsa of Nizami (British Library, Or. 12208)
