= Payk =

Persian servant running ahead of his master

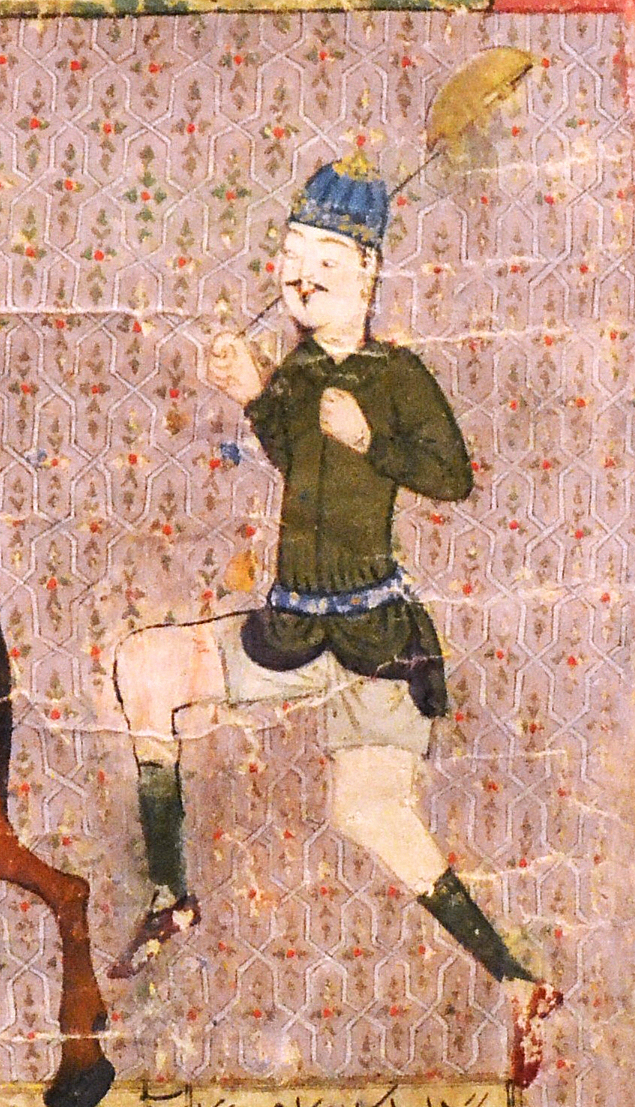
A payk' in the Timurid Zafarnama of 1436.

A payk was a groom running on foot, heralding his master on horse in medieval Persia. The figure of the payk appears in many Persian medieval miniatures, and it became a stock figure. The payk' already appears in 1386-88 in the Khamsa of Nizami (British Library, Or.13297), or in 1396 miniatures commissioned by Jalayirid rulers, such as a Kalila and Dimna (1375-1385, Tabriz), or under Sultan Ahmad (ruled 1382–1410) at the end of the 14th century, in works such as Khwaju Kirmani's mathnavis (1396). The payk is generally bare-legged, and equipped with a semi-circular axe.

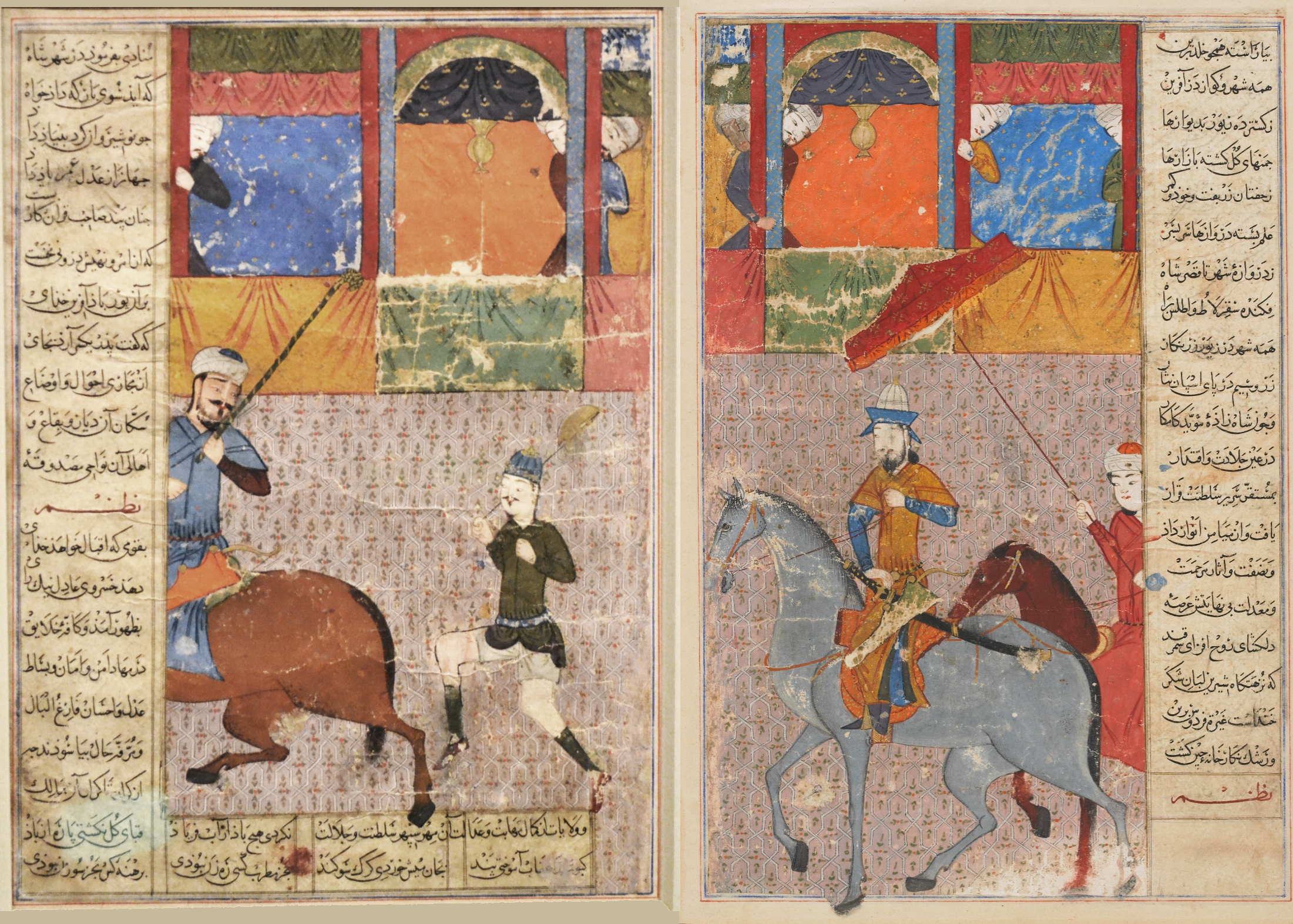
Shah Rukh on horse (right) is depicted making a triumphal entrance in Samarkand in 1394, after Timur named him Governor of the city. He is preceded by a customary Payk groom running on foot. Contemporary miniature, commissioned by Shah Rukh's son Ibrahim Sultan in his Zafarnama of 1436.

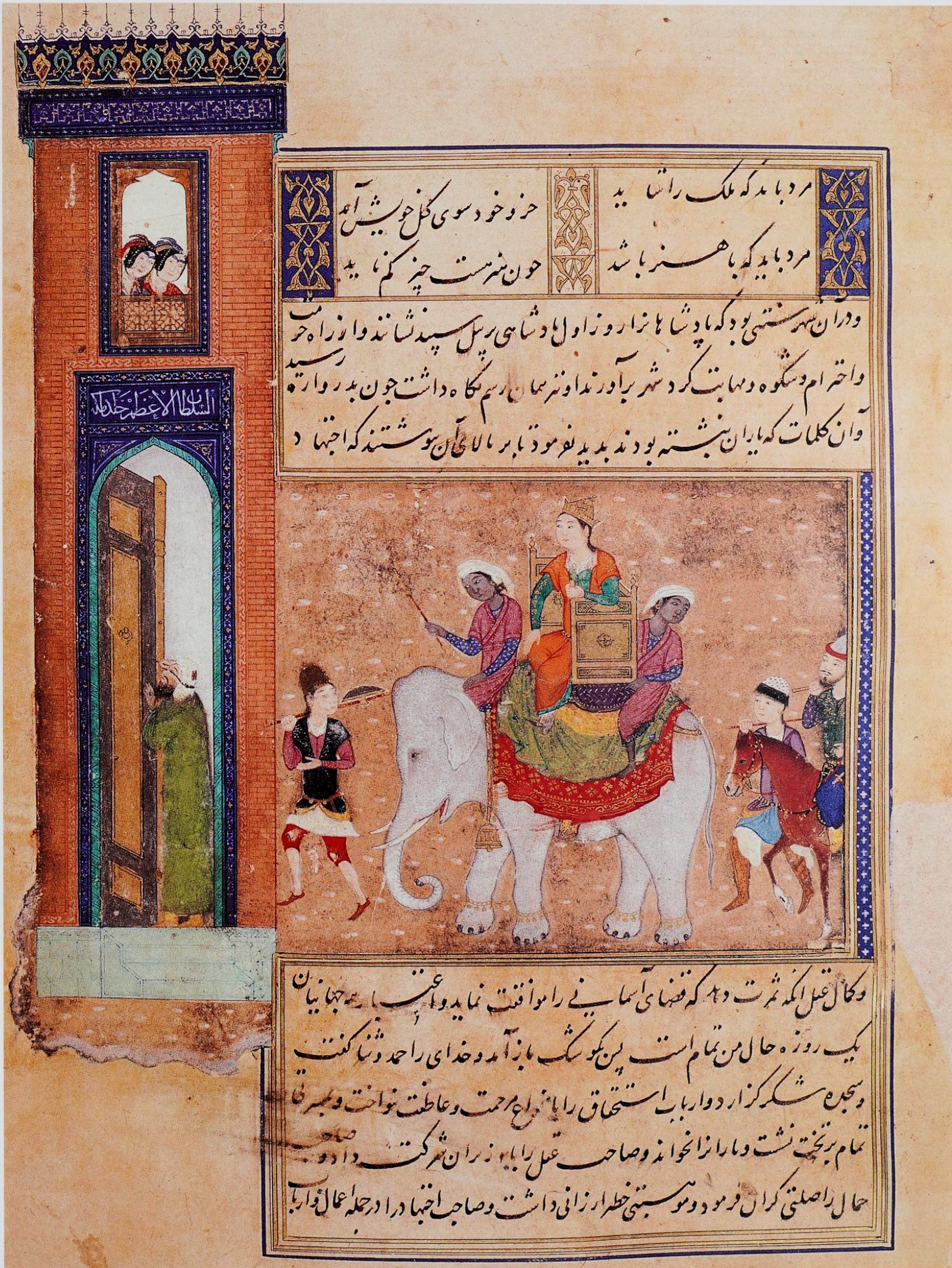
"The New King Paraded around the Town on a White Elephant", Kalila and Dimna, 1375-1385, Tabriz. Topkaki Saray Museum, H.362

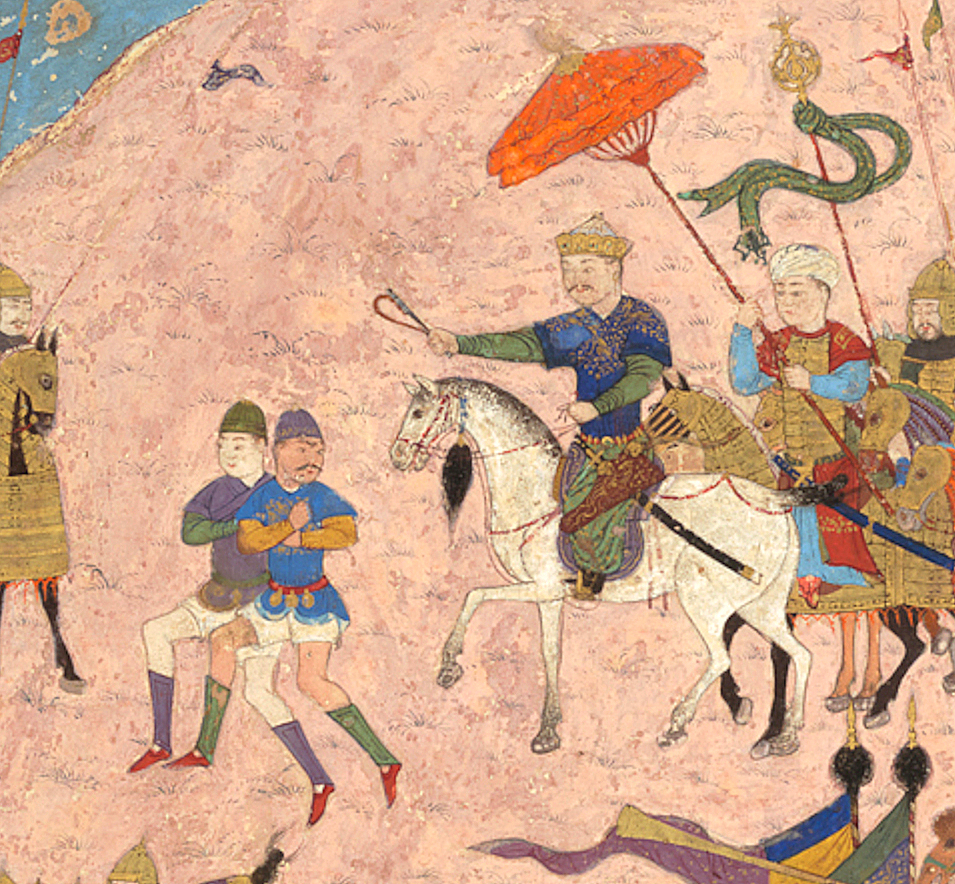
Timurid ruler Muhammad Juki preceded by two bare-legged running payk heralds (contemporary painting circa 1440)
