= Shaykhi =

15th-century painter

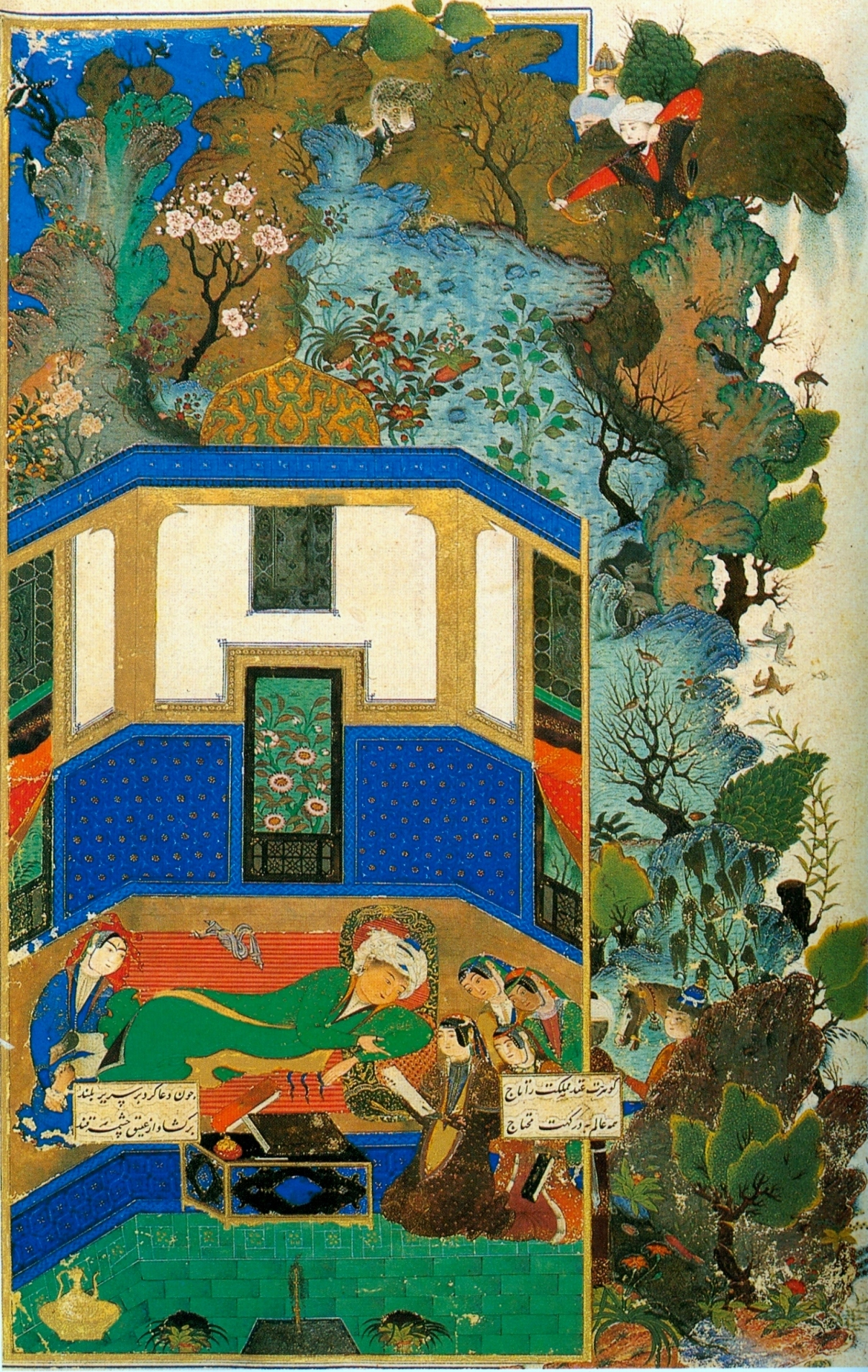
Bahram Gur in the Green Pavilion, painted by Shaykhi circa 1478–81

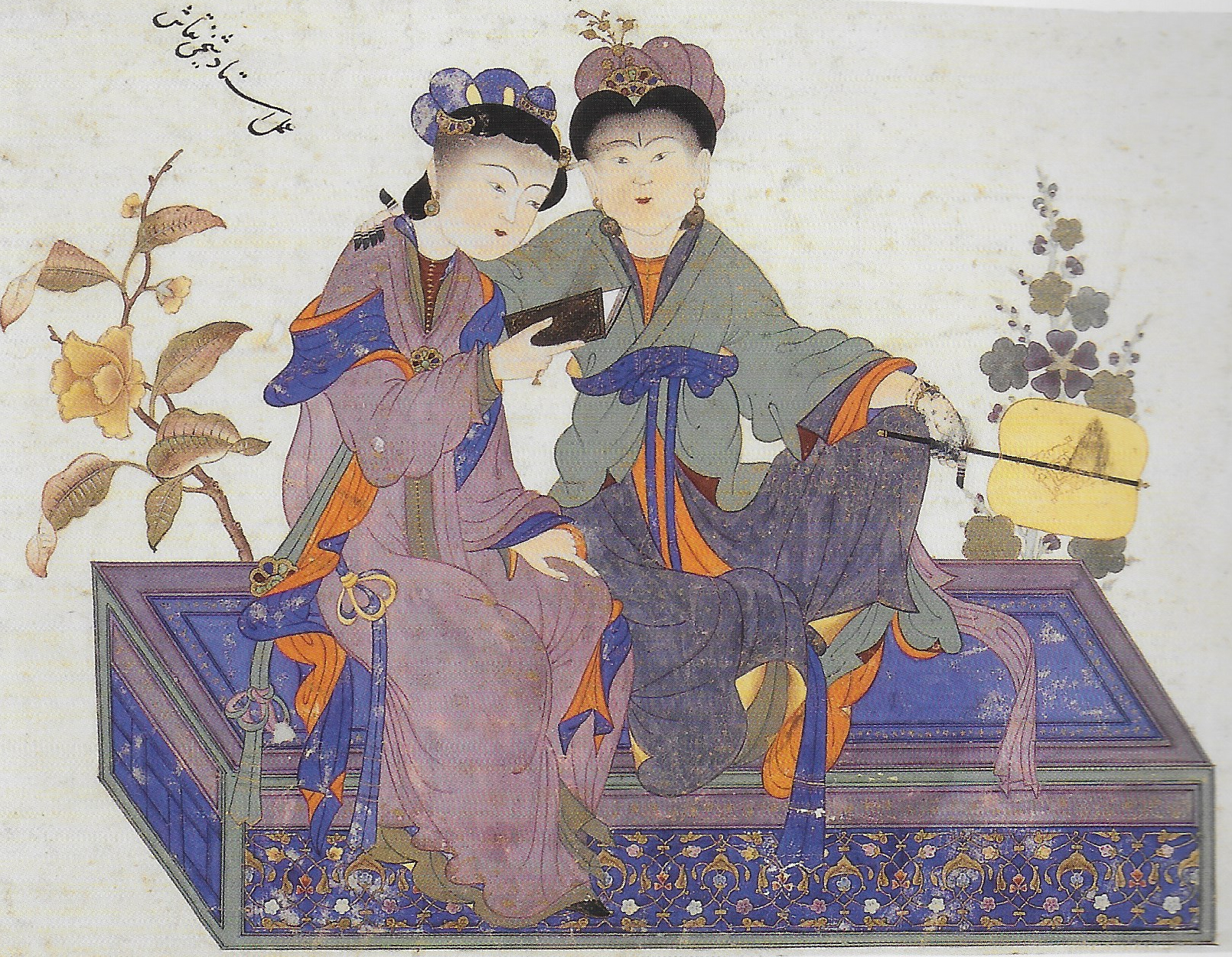
Chinese-style scene, signed by Shaykhi, ca. 1480. Tabriz. Topkapı Palace Library, H.2153.

Shaykhi (Persian: شیخی), also Ustad Shaikhi Naqqash or Shaykhi (al-Yaʿqubi) ("Shaykhi of Yaqub"), was a painter of the late 15th century, active in Tabriz at the court of the Aq Qoyunlu ruler Yaqub Beg.

Shaykhi was initially recruited with Darvish Muhammad by the Aq Qoyunlu ruler Sultan Khalil, in order to create miniatures for the Khamsa of Nizami (Tabriz, 1481). Sultan Khalil took the manuscript to the capital Tabriz when he inherited the throne in 1478, but he soon died the same year, assassinated by his brother Yaqub, as the manuscript was still unfinished.

Yaqub Beg then led the efforts to complete the manuscript, and especially the miniature program, with the two miniaturists Shaykhi and Darvish Muhammad. According to the colophon, he completed the manuscript in 1481. It is considered as "the supreme and ultimate fruit of his artistic patronage". The pictorial style has been qualified as having "ecstatic intensity".

The miniatures created under Yaqub Beg are: folios 51 v, 69, 82v, 163v, 167, 171v, 177v, 180v, 183 and 187. One of the most famous miniatures added by Yaqub Beg is the Bahram Gur in the Green Pavilion, painted by the Herat artist Shaykhi. Compared to the balanced Herat style of Bihzad for example, this miniature style uses a much more intense color palette, with acid greens and vivid blues, and abundant vegetation that seems to engulf the protagonists.

Shaykhi is also well-known for some Chinese-style paintings, to which he sometimes affixed his own signature, such as Two Young Women in Chinese Style Costume Seated on a Sofa or Nobles beneath a Blossoming Branch.

== Sources ==
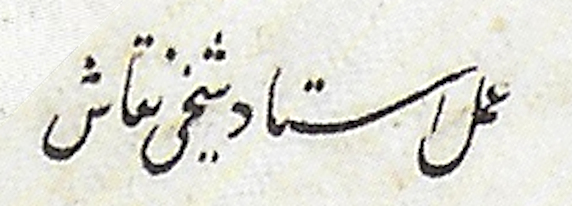
Signature "The work of Master Shaykhi the Painter" (Amāl-i ustād Shaikhī naqqāsh).

- Blair, Sheila S.; Bloom, Jonathan M. (25 September 1996). The Art and Architecture of Islam 1250-1800. Yale University Press. p. 68. ISBN 978-0-300-06465-0.
