= Khamsa of Nizami (Tabriz, 1481) =

15th-century illuminated manuscript

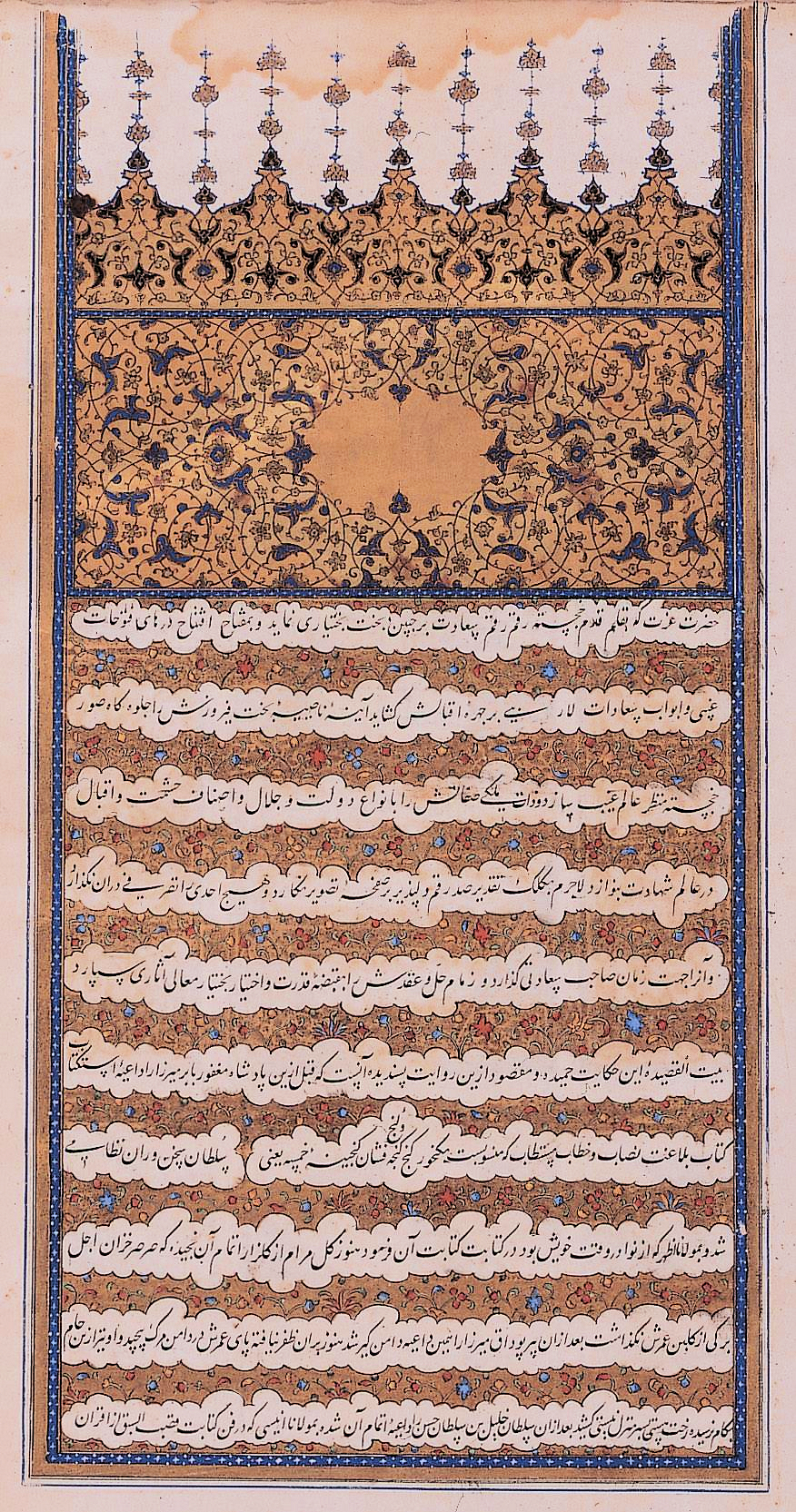
Colophon to Nizami's "Khamsa", written by 'Abd al-Rahim al- Khwarazmi Anisi in 1481 (TKS H762, f. 316a)

The Khamsa of Nizami (Tabriz, 1481) is a manuscript of the Khamsa of Nizami, mainly commissioned by the Aq Qoyunlu ruler Yaqub Beg in 1481, in the city of Tabriz. The manuscript was started significantly earlier in 1449–57 at the Timurid court of Herat, and changed hands several times throughout the 15th and 16th centuries, embodying various styles along this perigrination, until the final addition of eleven miniatures by the new Safavid ruler Shah Ismail in 1505. Most of the manuscript is now in the Topkapı Palace Museum Library in Istambul under the inventory code H.762, but a few more folios are detached and are now part of the Keir Collection in London.

In its final composition in the Topkapı Palace Museum Library, the manuscript is composed of 317 folios (H. 0.300 x W. 0.195). Two colophons on folios 148 and 316, indicate that it was calligraphed by 'Abd al-Rahîm ibn 'Abd al-Rahmân al-Khvârezmi al-Sulțânî al-Yaʻqûbî ("attached to Sultan Yaqub Beg"), and completed in the month of Muharram 886 AH (March 1481), in the dar sultaniyeh quarter of Tabriz. In addition, the manuscript has illuminations and 19 paintings. Three more paintings from the manuscript are known, which have been removed and are now in the Keir collection in London.

== Chronology ==
=== Timurid inception (1449–57) ===
The manuscript was initially commissioned by the Timurid prince Abu'l-Qasim Babur (r. 1449–57) in the Timurid capital of Herat, who relied on the calligrapher Azhar for the text. But the work remained unfinished due to the death of the ruler in 1557.

=== Qara Qoyunlu capture ===
A year later, the Qara Qoyunlu ruler Jahan Shah accomplished the capture of Herat (1458) from the Timurids, occupying the city for a period of 6 months. Jahanshah's son Pir Budaq took the manuscript with him to Shiraz, when they retreated from the city of Herat.

=== Aq Qoyunlu takeover (1467-1481) ===
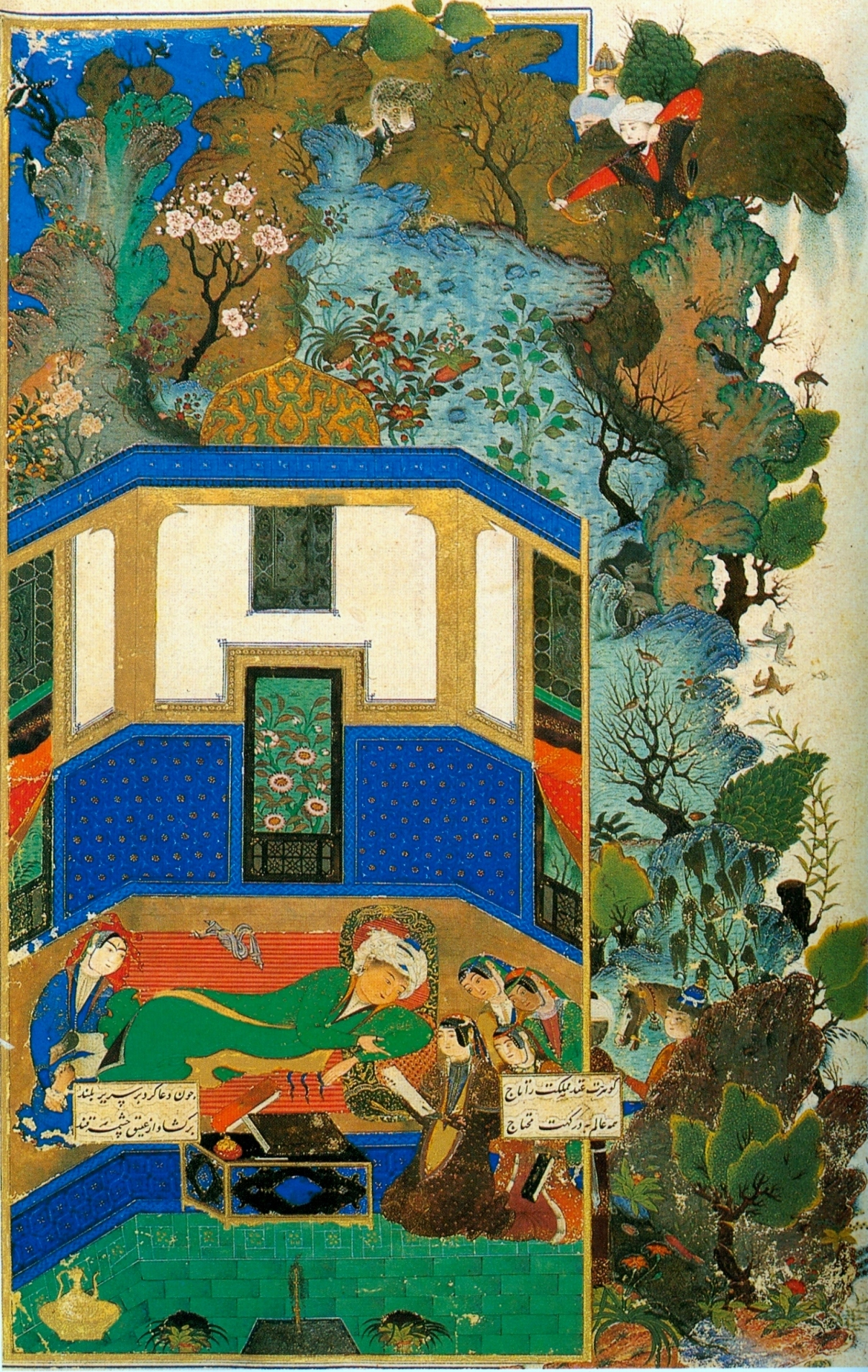
Bahram Gur in the Green Pavilion, painted in Tabriz by the Herat artist Shaykhi (folio 180v)

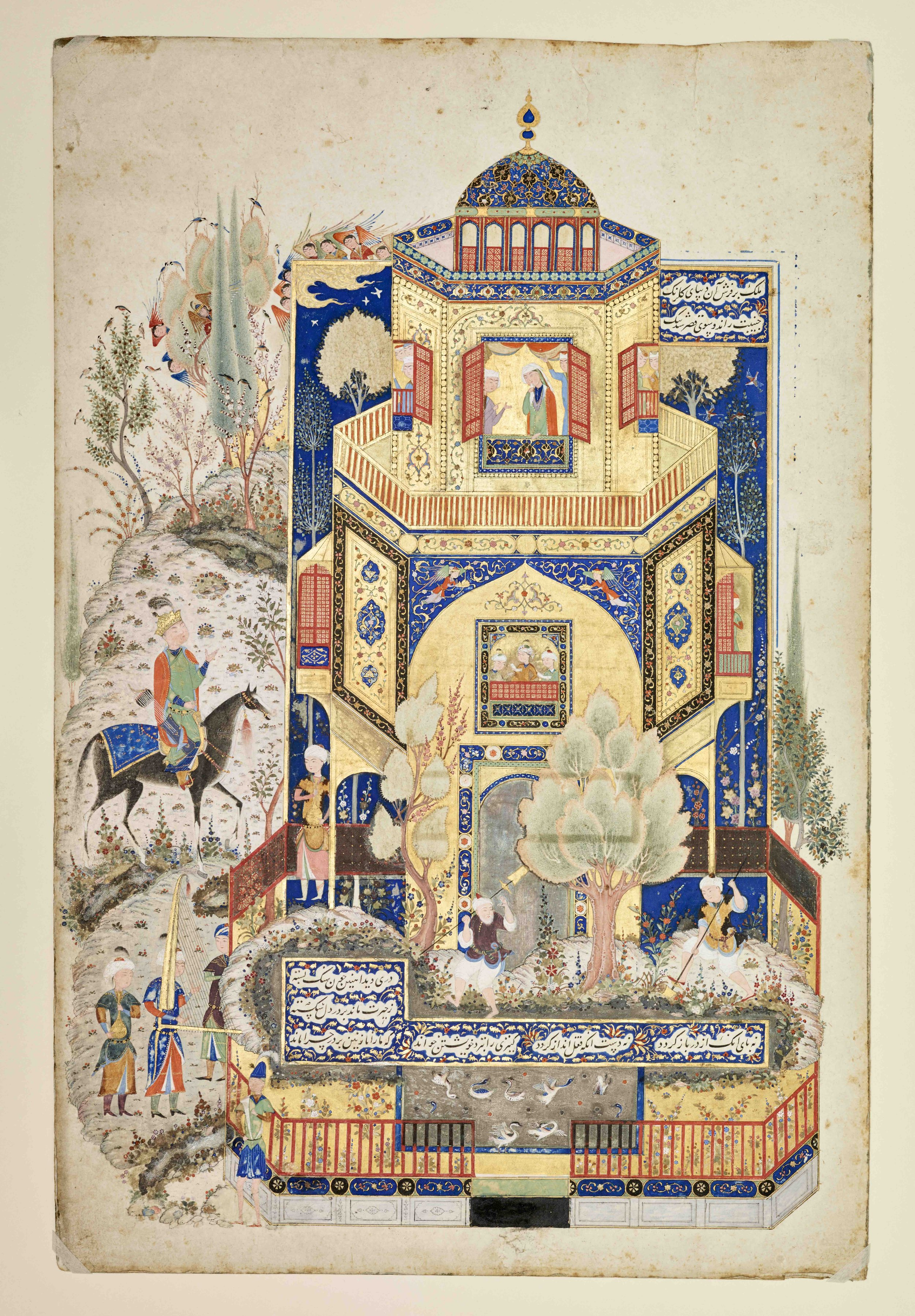
Hasht Behesht Palace in Tabriz, in Khosrow under the windows of Shirin (Keir Collection)

After the Aq Qoyunlu vanquished the Qara Qoyunlu in 1467, the city of Shiraz was governed by Sultan Khalil who also had a great interest in books and commissioned the calligrapher 'Abd al-Rahman al-Khwarazmi, known as Anisi, to finish copying the text, and two miniaturists, Shaykhi and Darvish Muhammad, for the illustrations.

When he inherited the throne in 1478, Sultan Khalil took the artists of his Shiraz kitabkhāna atelier with him to the Āq quyūnlū capital of Tabriz, paving the way for Tabriz to become the finest royal Āq quyūnlū workshop. He also took maunscripts with him, including the Khamsa. But Sultan Khalil soon died the same year, assassinated by his brother Yaqub, as the manuscript was still unfinished. Yaqub Beg then led the efforts to complete the manuscript, and especially the miniature program, with the two miniaturists Shaykhi and Darvish Muhammad. According to the colophon, he completed the manuscript in 1481. It is considered as "the supreme and ultimate fruit of his artistic patronage". The pictorial style has been qualified as having "ecstatic intensity".

The miniatures created under Yaqub Beg and now in the Topkapı Palace Museum Library are: folios 51 v, 69, 82v, 163v, 167, 171v, 177v, 180v, 183 and 187. One of the most famous miniatures added by Yaqub Beg is the Bahram Gur in the Green Pavilion, painted by the Herat artist Shaykhi. Compared to the balanced Herat style of Bihzad for example, this miniature style uses a much more intense color palette, with acid greens and vivid blues, and abundant vegetation that seems to engulf the protagonists.

Yaqub Beg himself is thought to appear as Bahram Gur in several of the miniatures, such as Bahram Gur visits the Green Palace and Bahram Gur in the yellow palace.

Another famous painting created by Yaqub Beg, and now in the Keir Collection in London, is that of the Hasht Behesht Palace in Tabriz, a palace started by Uzun Hasan and completed by his son Yaqub Beg. Here, Yaqub's palace in Tabriz is used as the setting for the composition of the romantic scene Khosrow under the windows of Shirin.

The Khamsa of Nizami (Tabriz, 1481) represents some of the very finest court style, and must be distinguished from many of the more prosaic contemporary manuscripts belonging to the Turkoman Commercial style centered on the city of Shiraz.

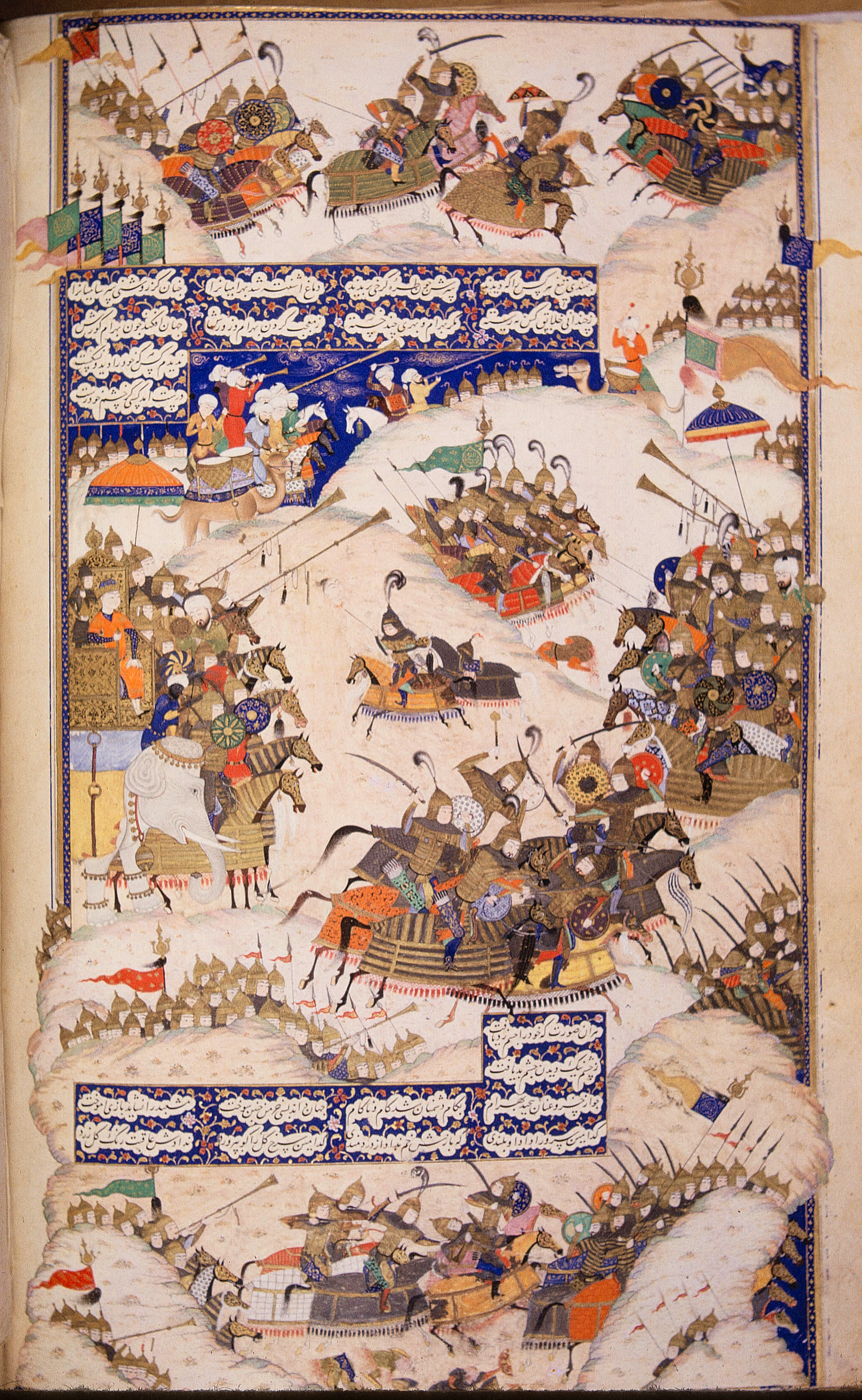
Khusraw and Bahram Chubin in battle (folio 51v)

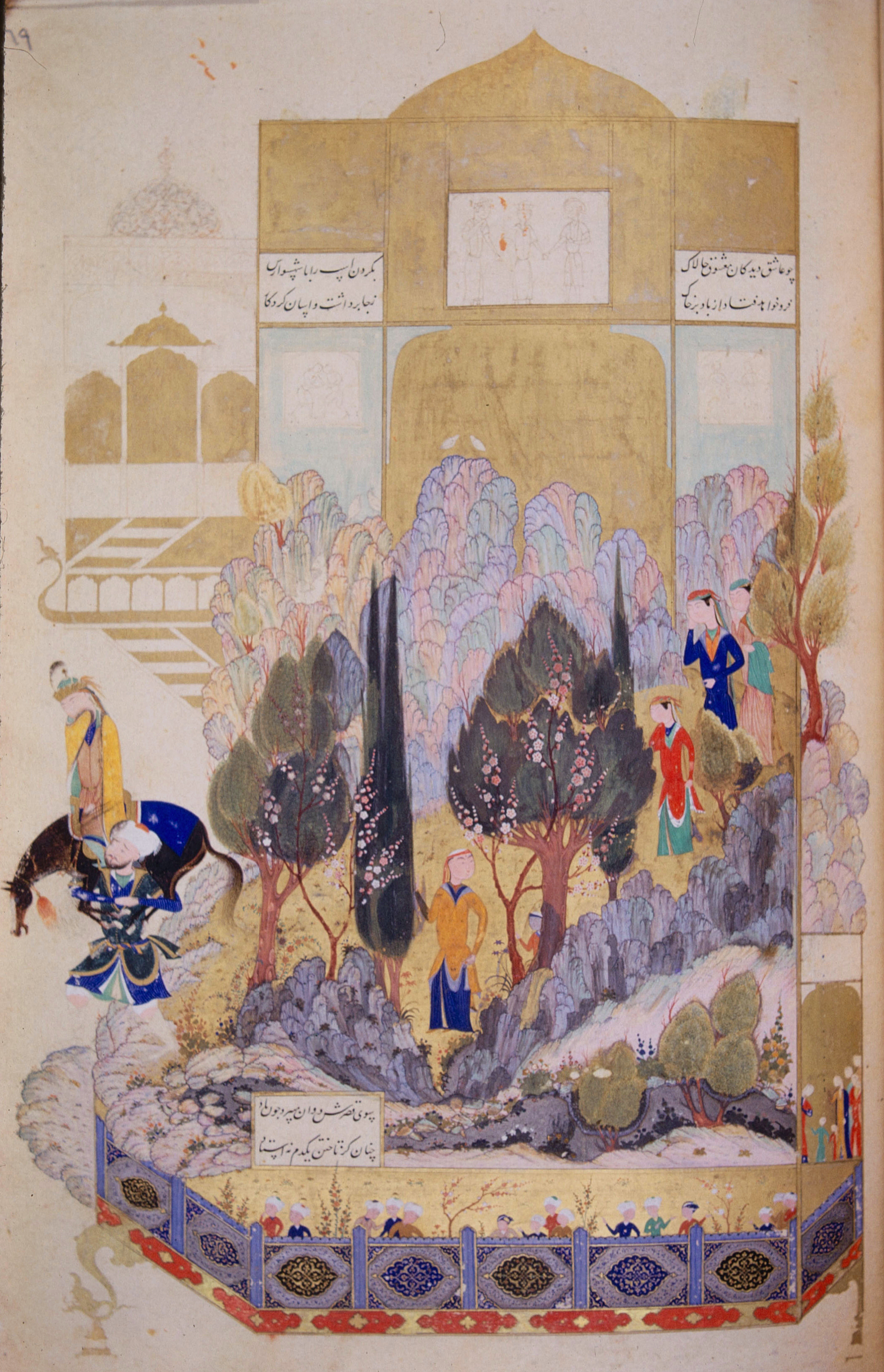
Farhad carries Shirin and her horse (folio 69r)

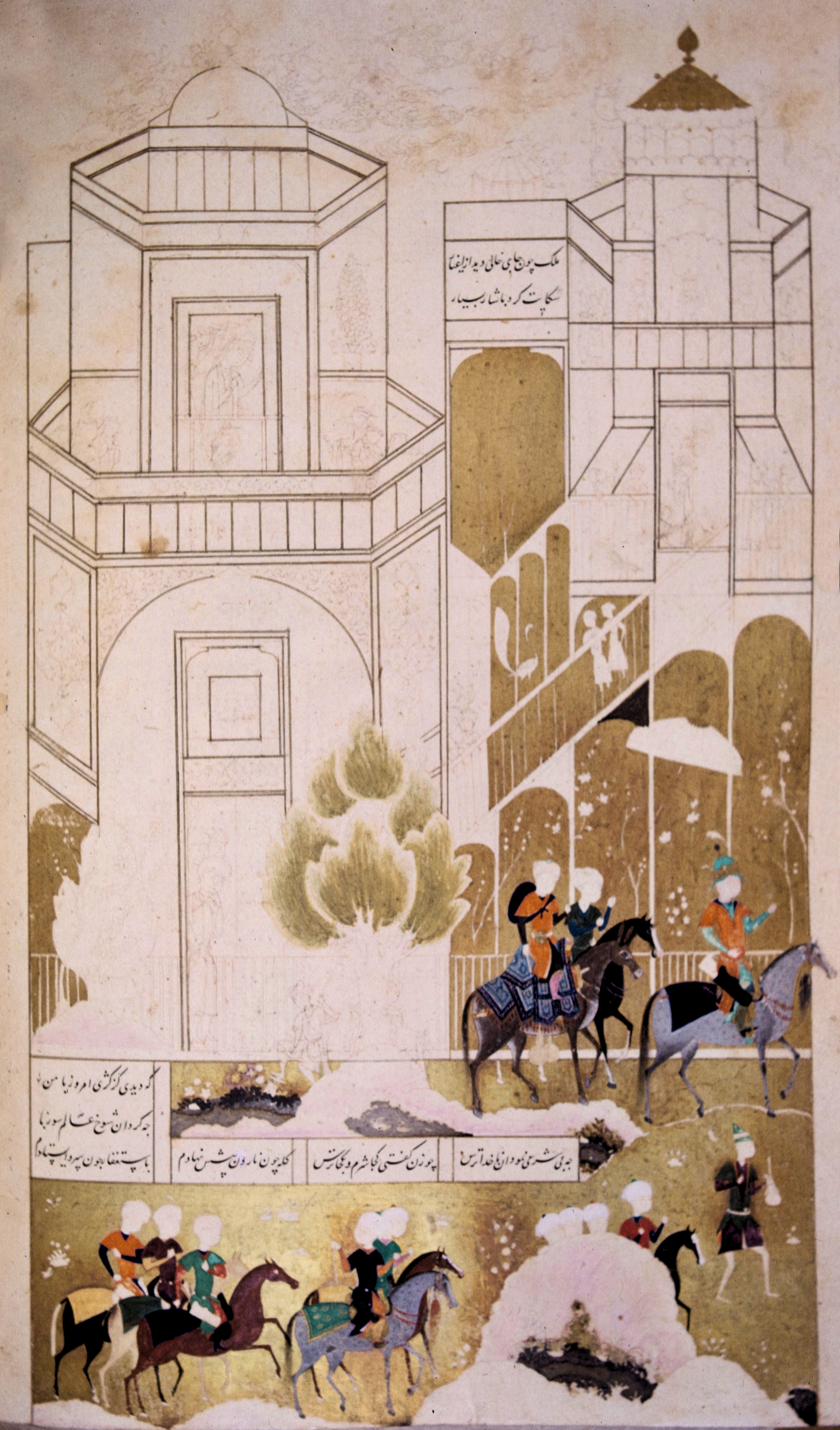
Khusrau leaving Shirin's palace (folio 82v)

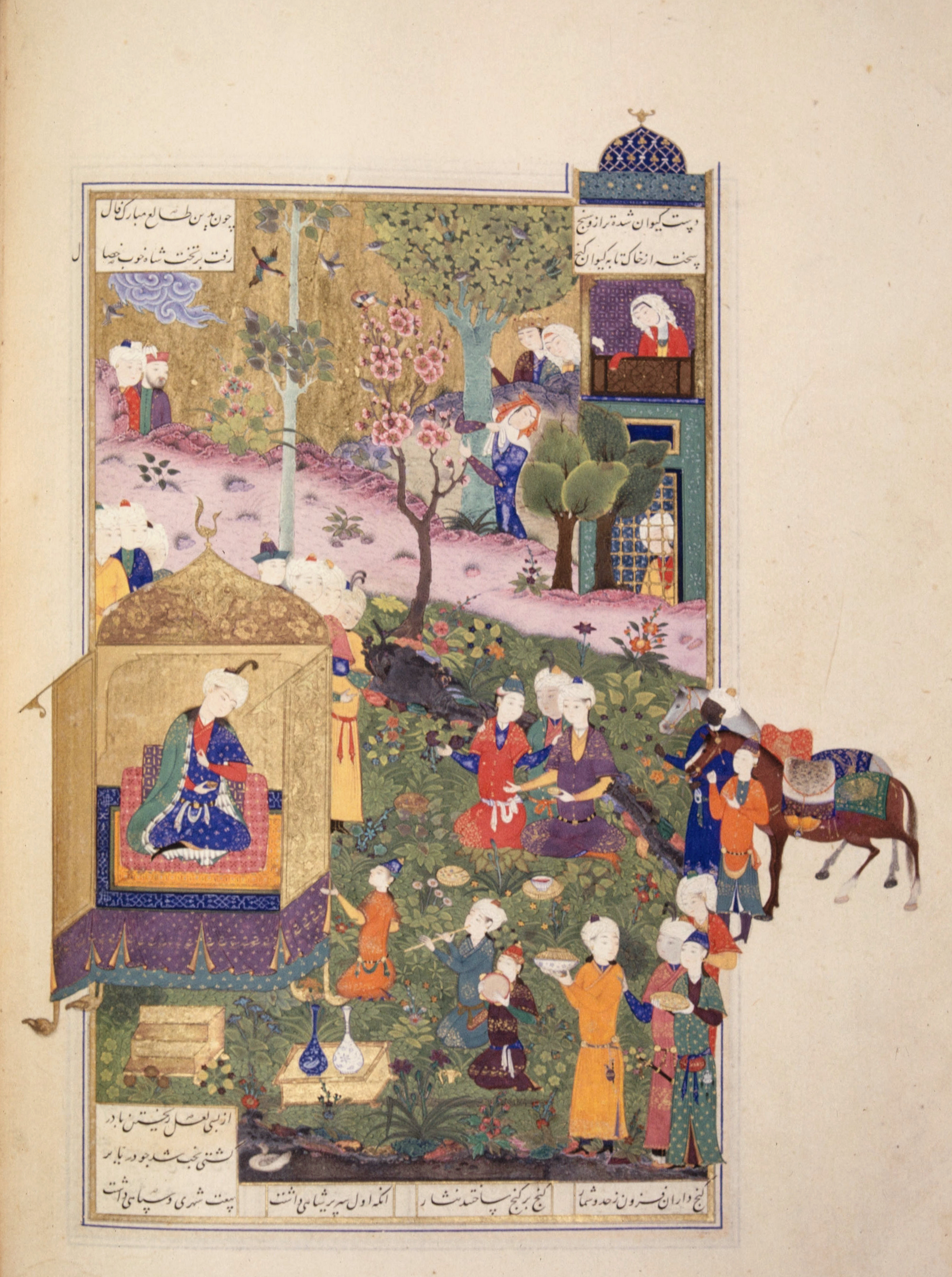
Bahram Gur enthroned in a meadow, surrounded by his retinue (folio 163v)

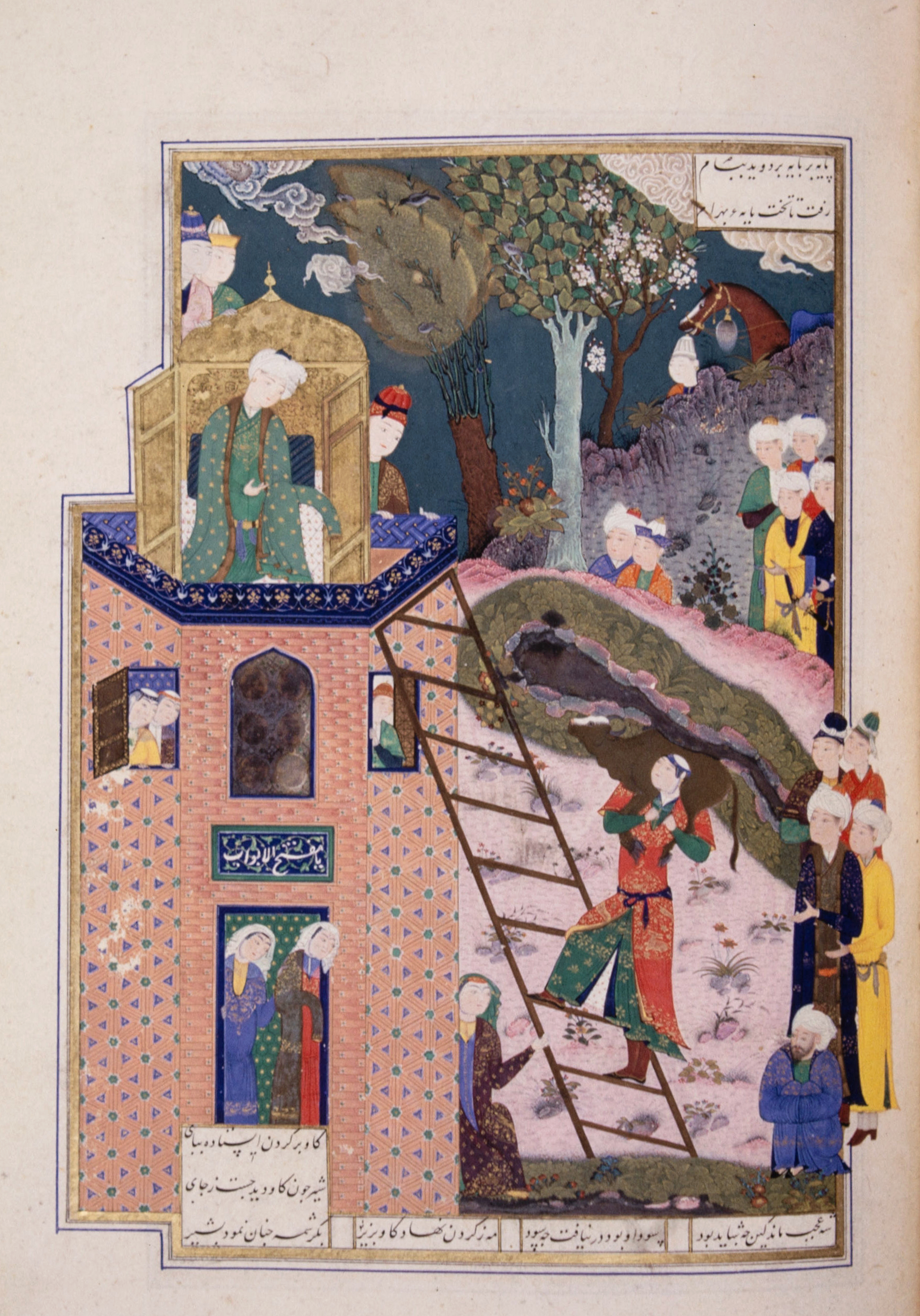
Bahram observes Fitna carrying a young calf (folio 167r)

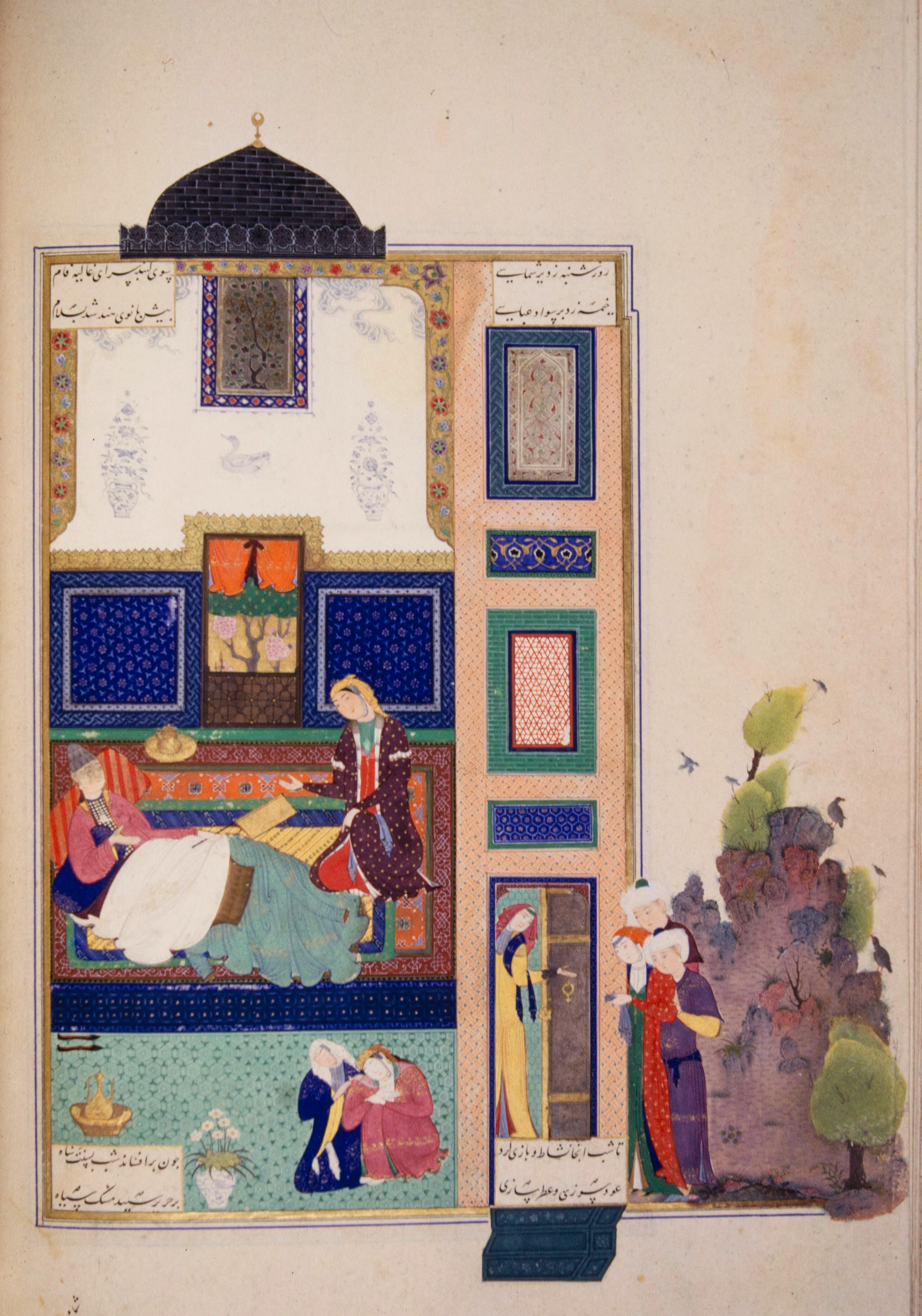
Bahram Gur in the Black Pavilion (folio 171v)

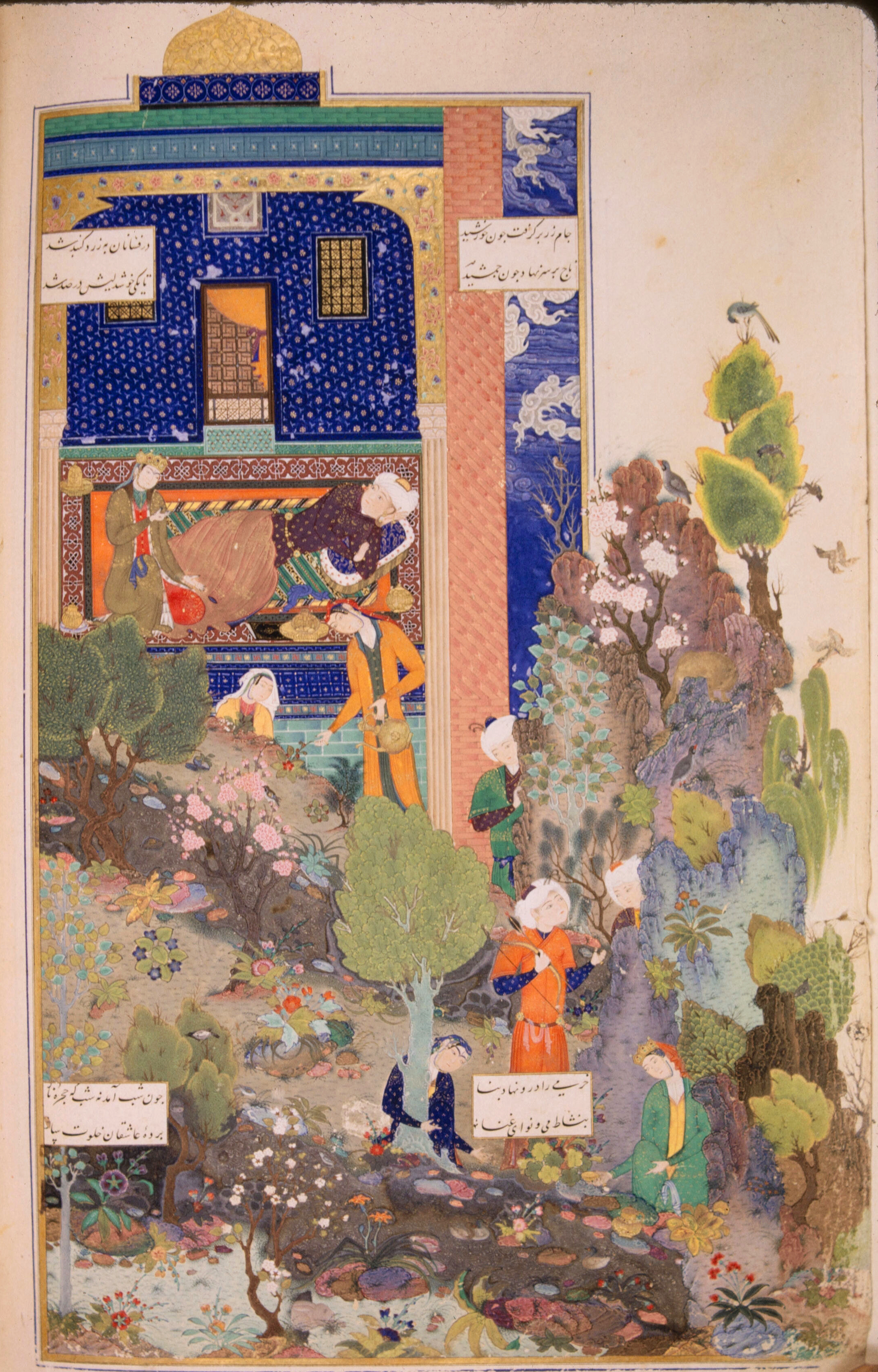
Bahram Gur with the Moorish princess in the Yellow pavilion (folio 177v)

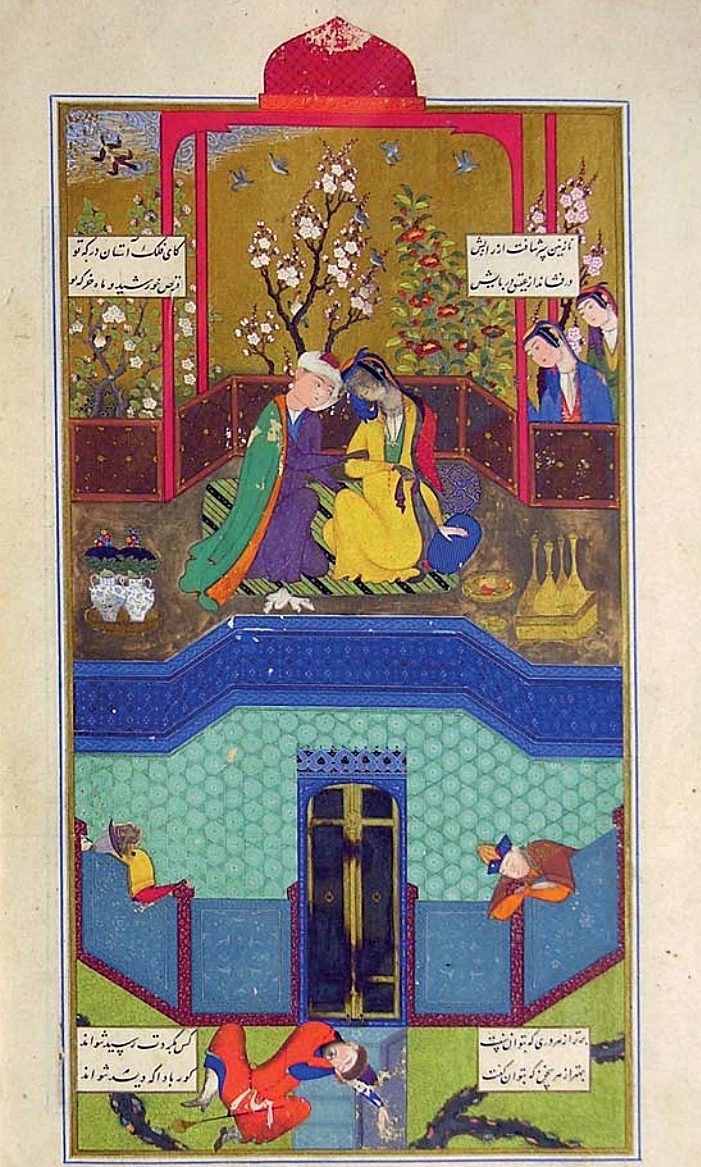
Bahram in the red palace (folio 183v)

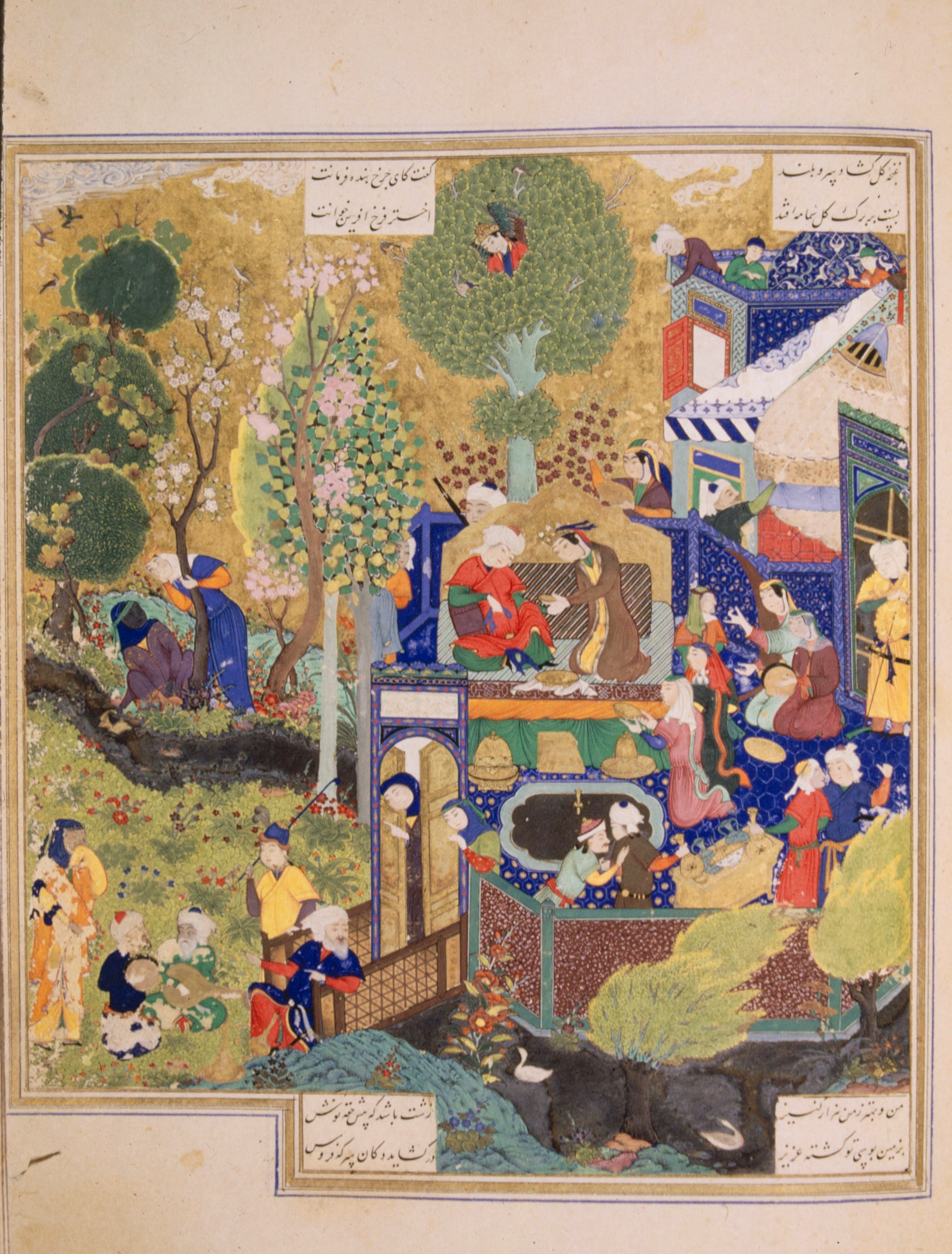
Bahram Gur in the Blue Pavilion (folio 187r)

=== Safavid additions (c.1505) ===
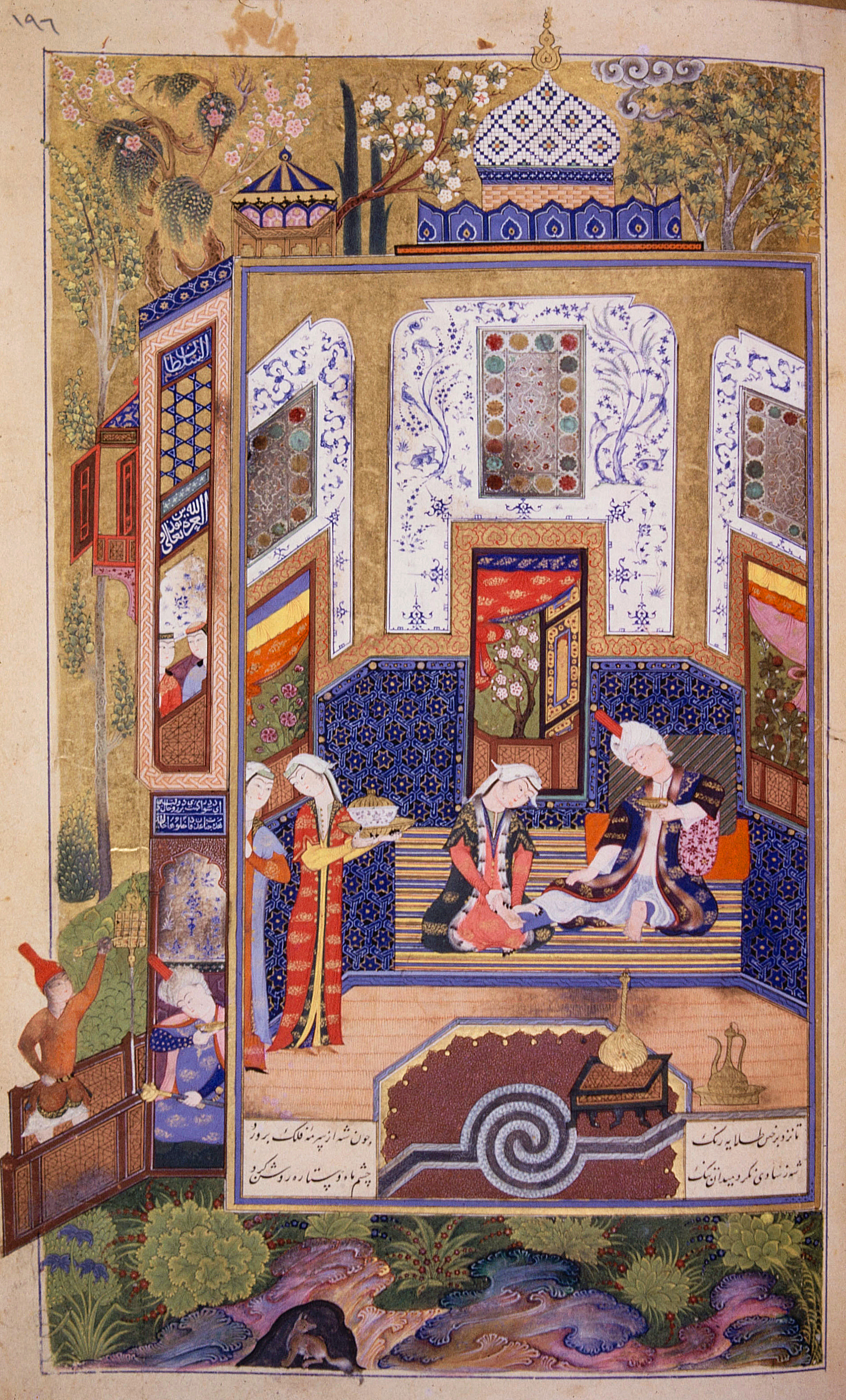
Bahram Gur in the White Pavilion (196r). Tabriz (Istanbul, Topkapi H. 762), circa 1505.

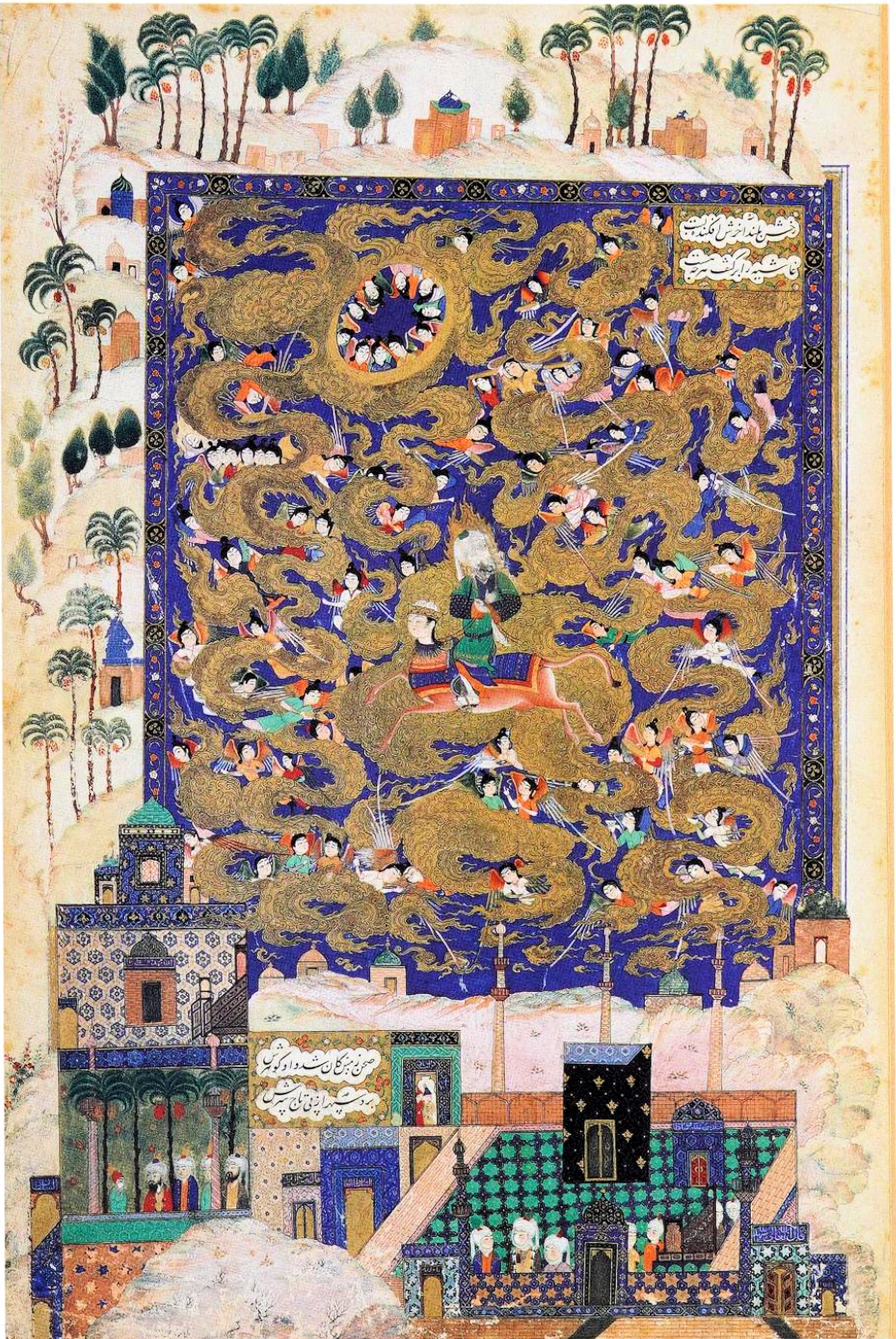
The Mir'aj of Prophet Muhammad. Khamsa of Nizami, 1505, Tabriz (Keir Collection, III. 207)

The manuscript was supplemented by Ismail I (r. 1501-24), who had just conquered Tabriz in 1501-1502, and was founding the Safavid dynasty. He had eleven new miniatures added to the manuscript. Shah Isma'il entrusted the creation of the eleven miniatures to the young painter Sultan Mohammed, who later became a key artist of the Safavid school. The miniatures created under Shah Isma'il now in the Topkapı Palace Museum Library are folios 12, 38v, 46, 89 v, 192, 196, 233, 244 and 285.

The criteria used to differentiate the Safavid miniatures from the Aq Qoyunlu ones is for a great part iconographic, as the protagonists in Shah Isma'il's paintings generally wear his signature turban, the Taj-i Haydari, which he introduced when he occupied Tabriz in 1501-1502.

Some of the paintings created by Sultan Mohammed for this manuscript are considered as highly original, such as The Mir'aj of Prophet Muhammad (now in the Keir Collection in London), in which the Prophet can be seen rising over the Great Mosque in Mecca, the Ka'ba and his tomb, riding into a billowing mass of heavenly clouds with a multitude of angels. The sky is pieced with an oculus, an artistic device of probable European origin. A small inscription in gold letters on the portal of a small building on a terrace gives the date of creation as 1505.

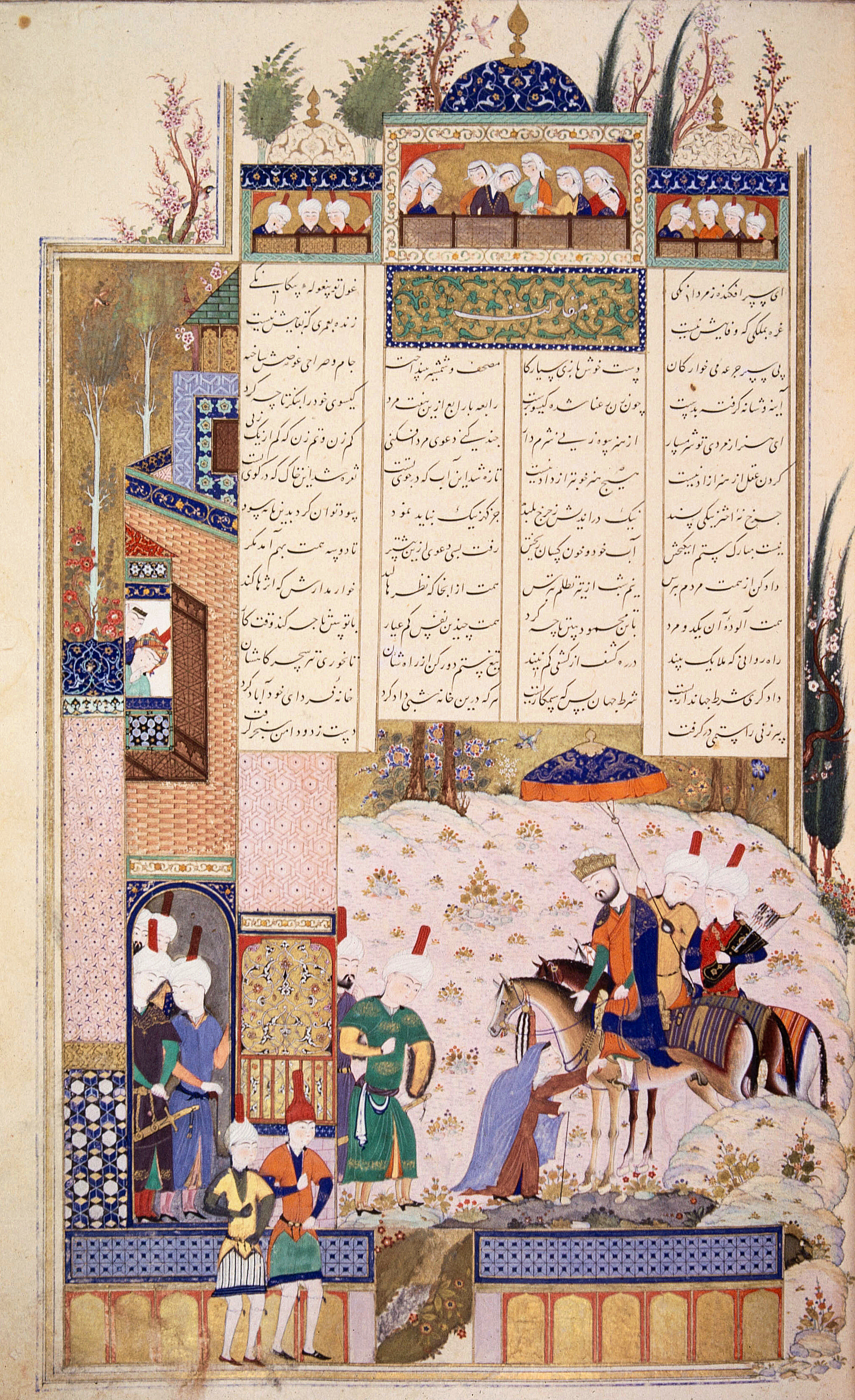
Sultan Sanjar and the old woman (12r)

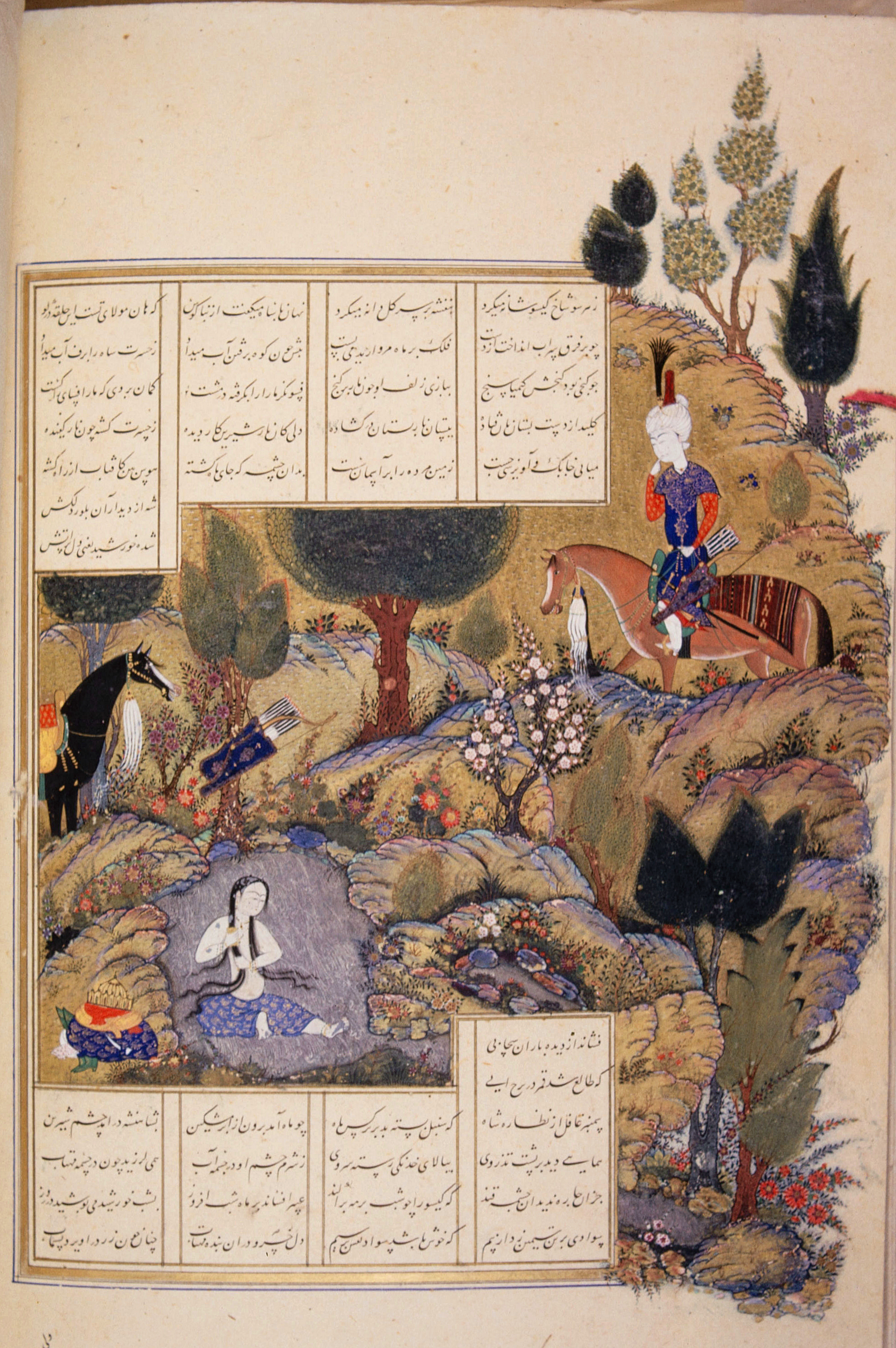
Khusraw spies Shirin bathing (38v)

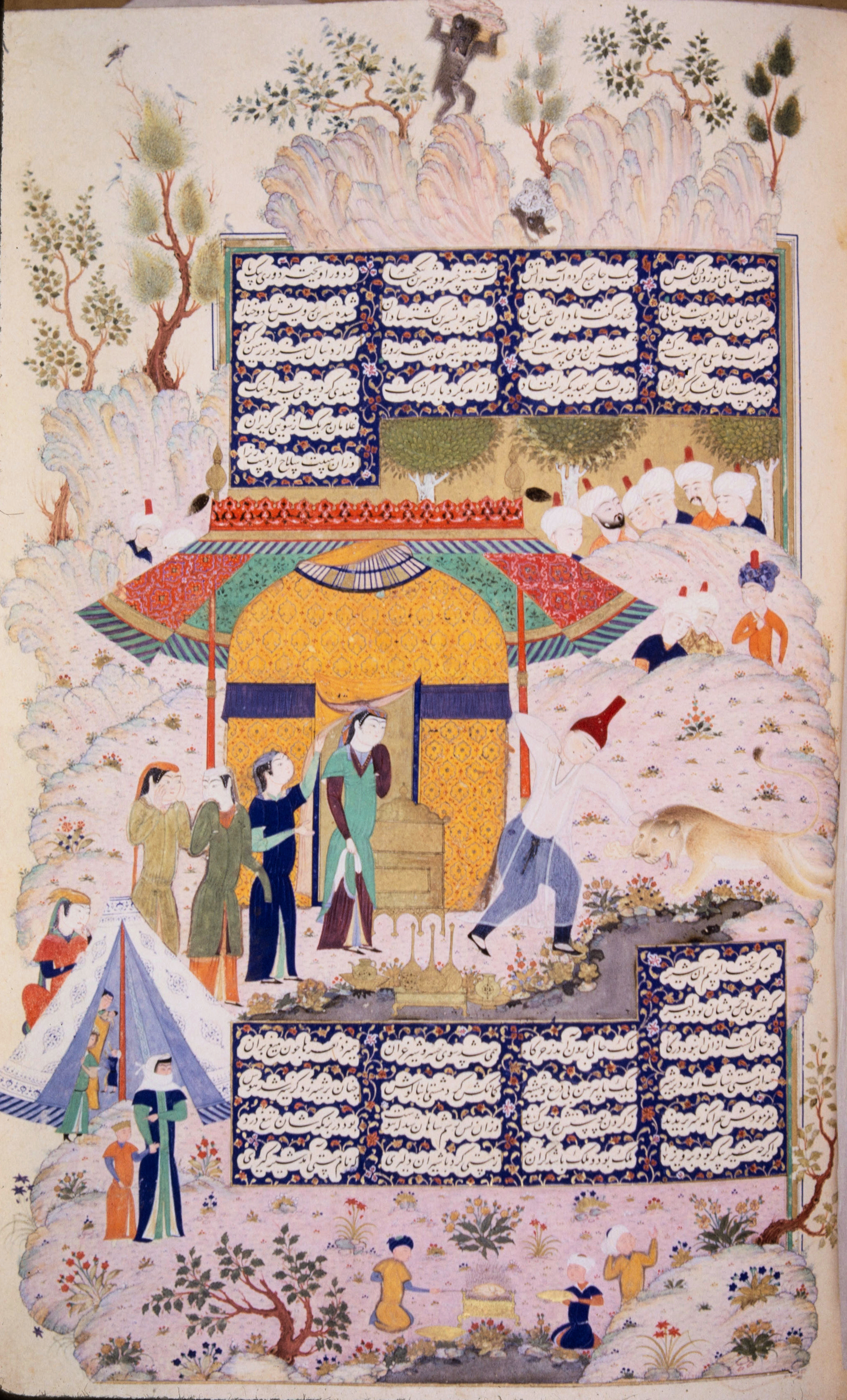
Khusraw rescues Shirin by killing a lion with his bare hands (46r)

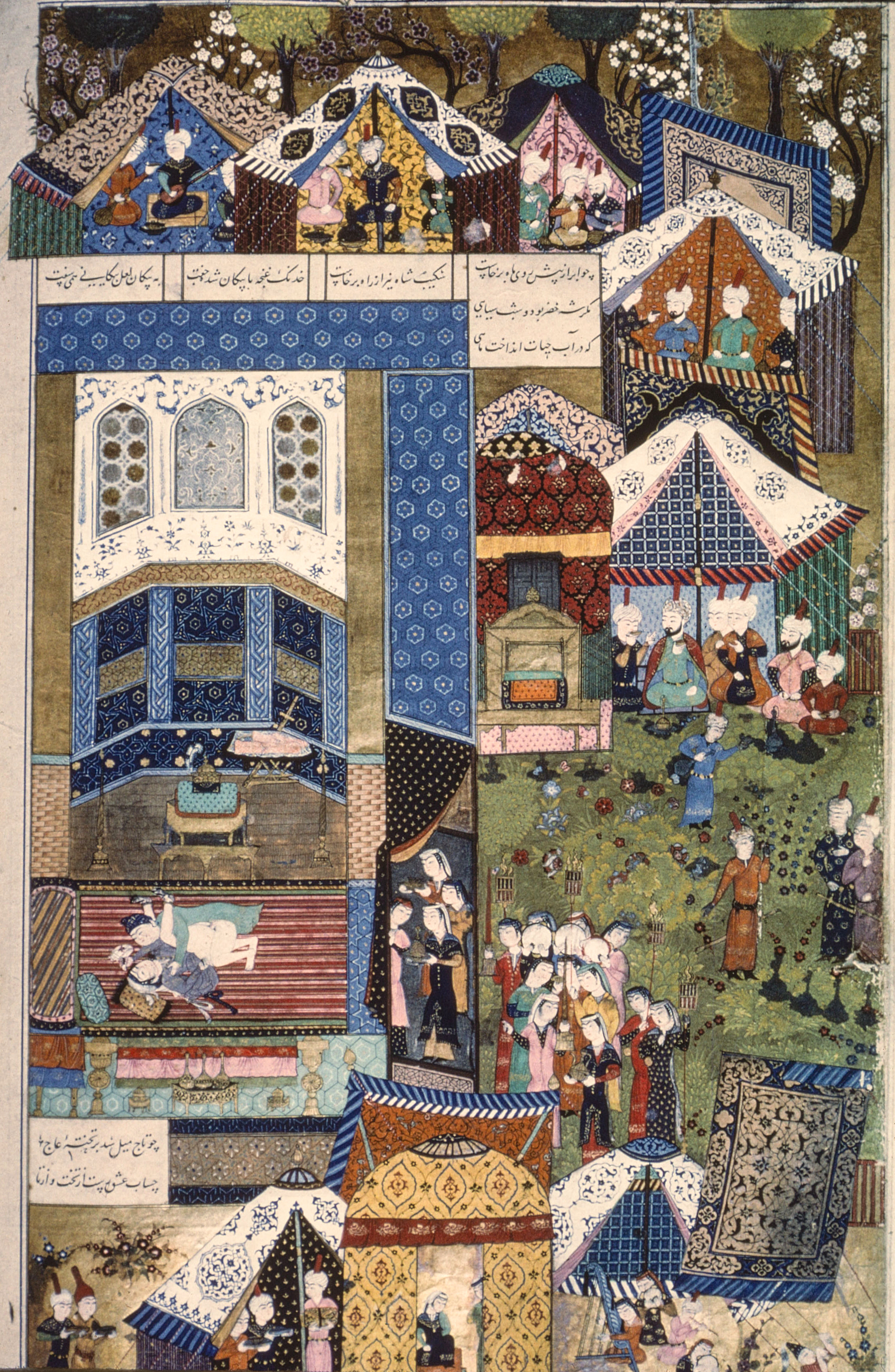
The marriage of Khusrau and Shirin (folio 89v)

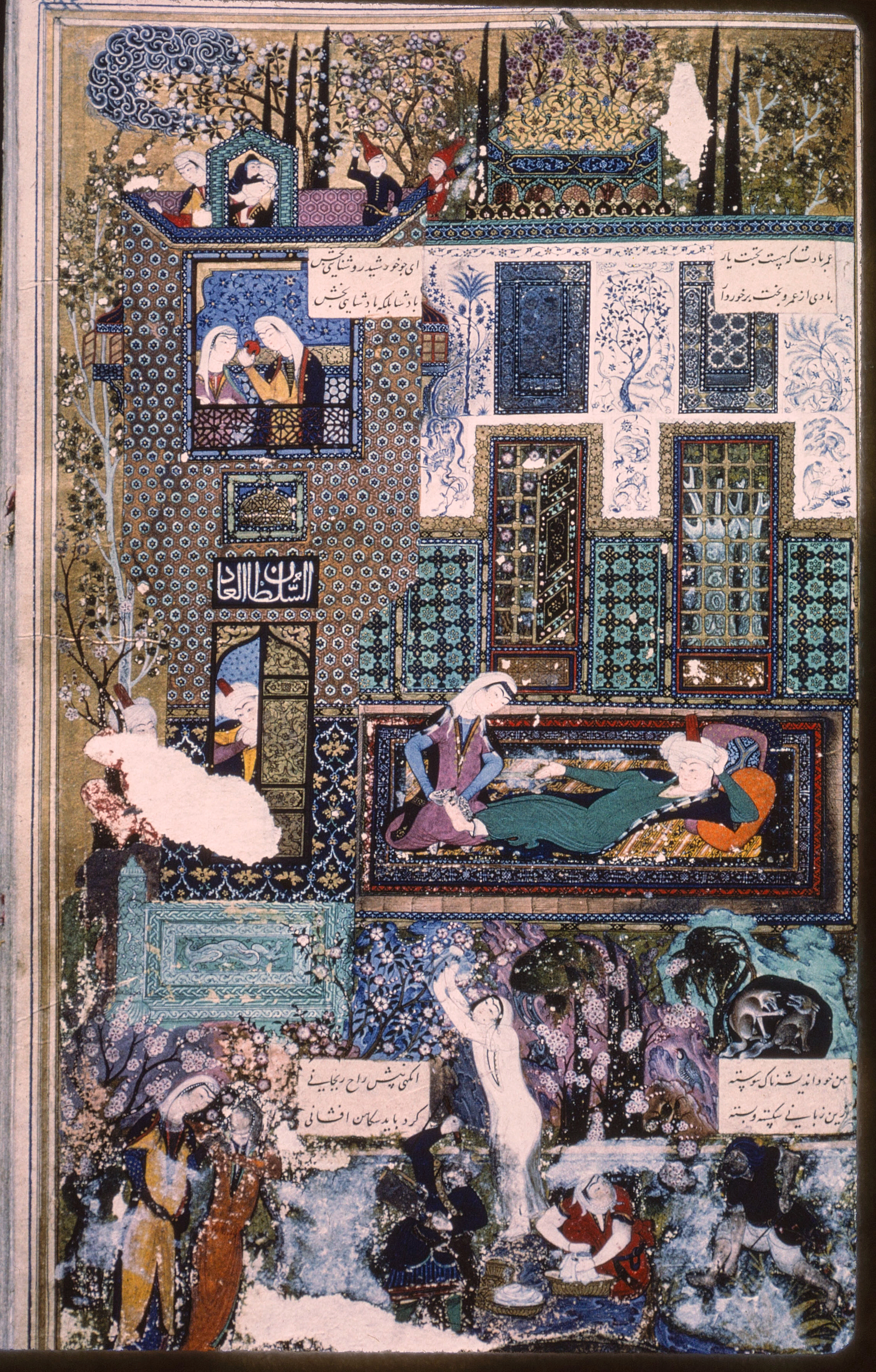
Bahram Gur in the Sandalwood Pavilion (folio 191r)

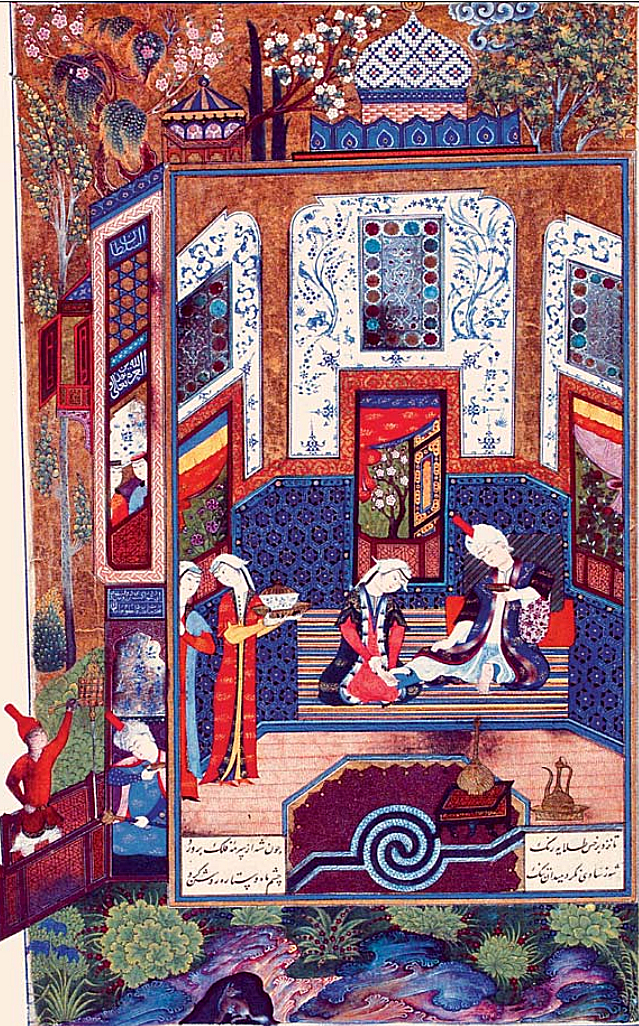
The wedding of Khosrov and Shirin (folio 196)

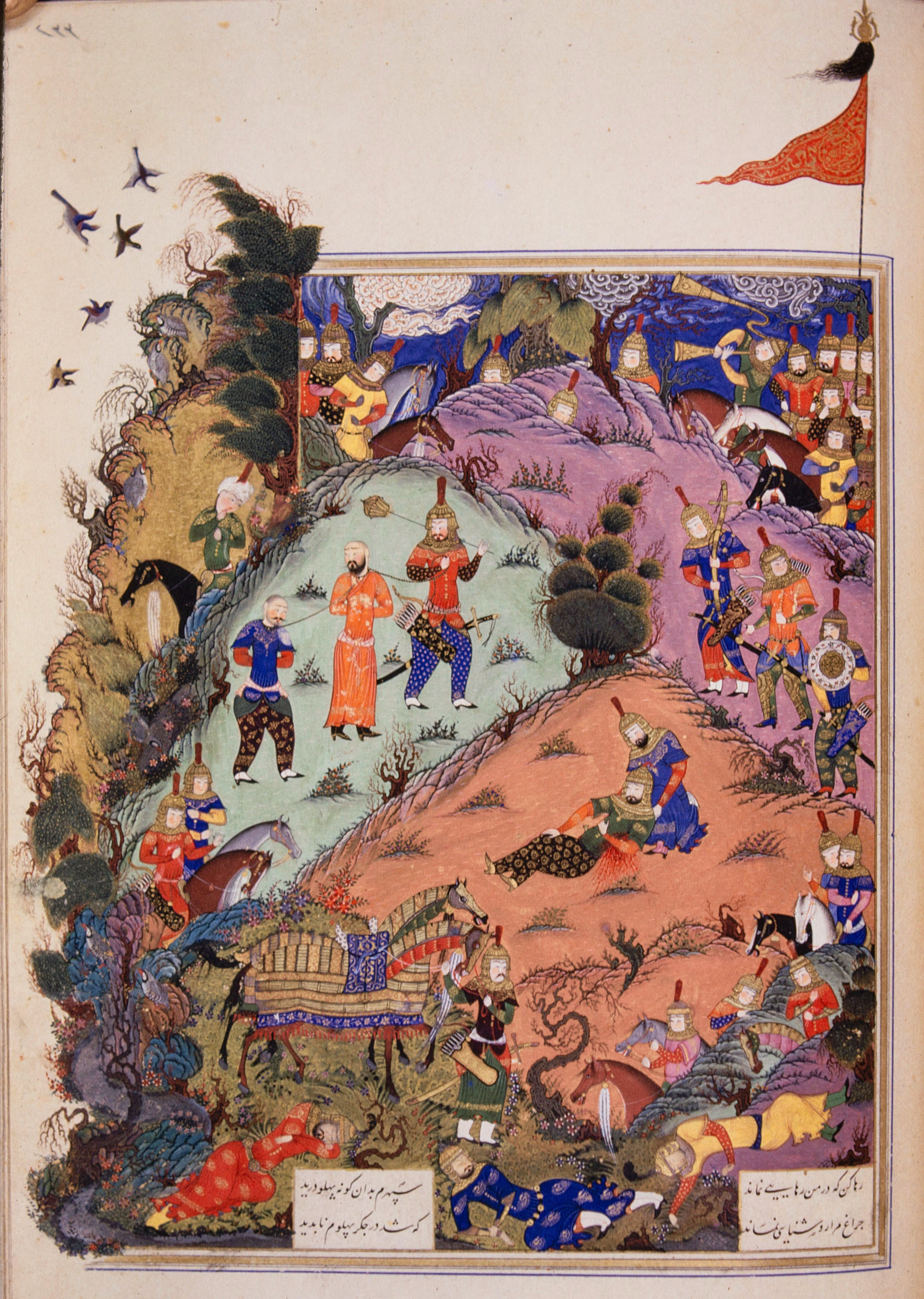
Iskandar comforting the dying Dara (folio 223r)

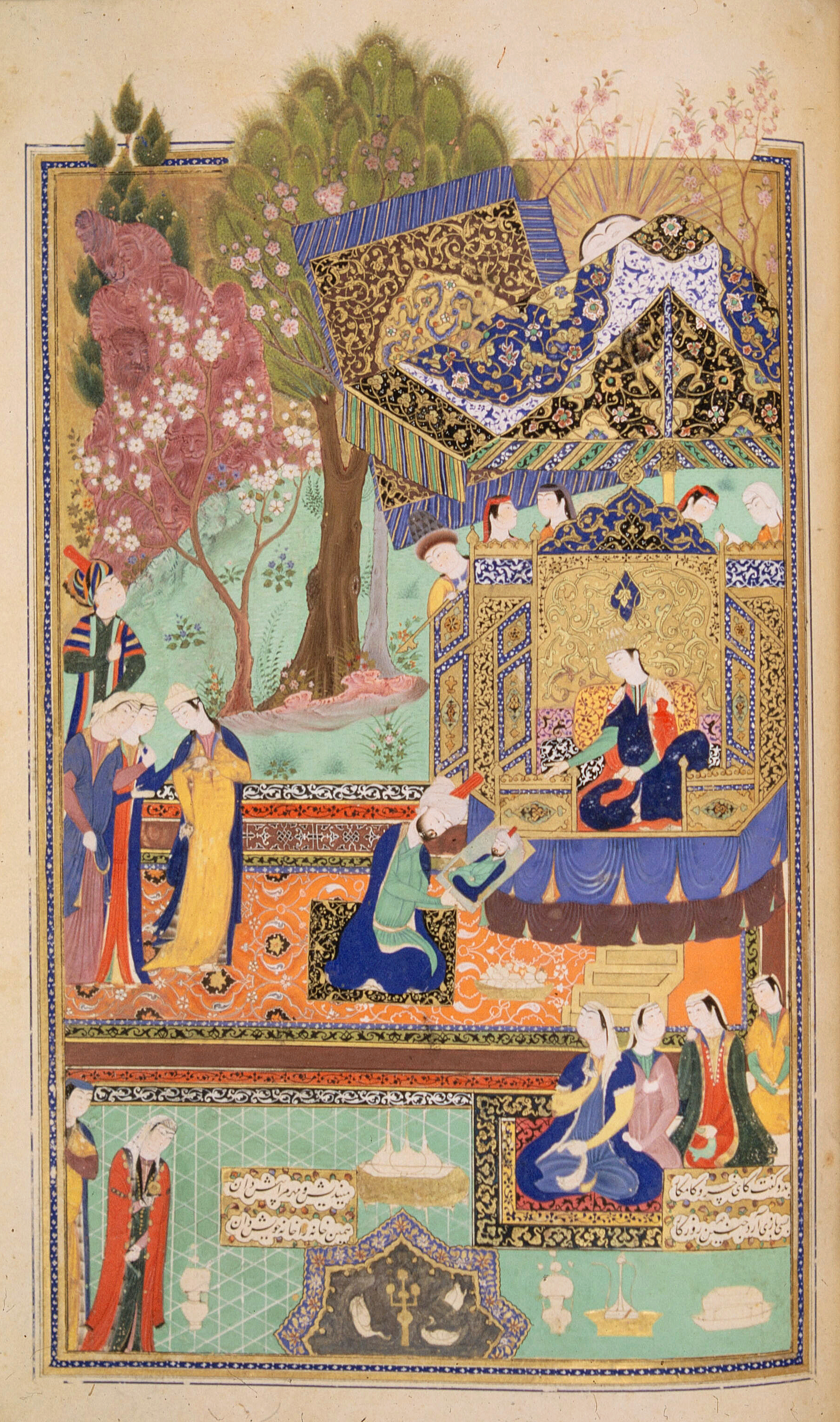
Nushaba recognizing Iskandar from his portrait (244r)

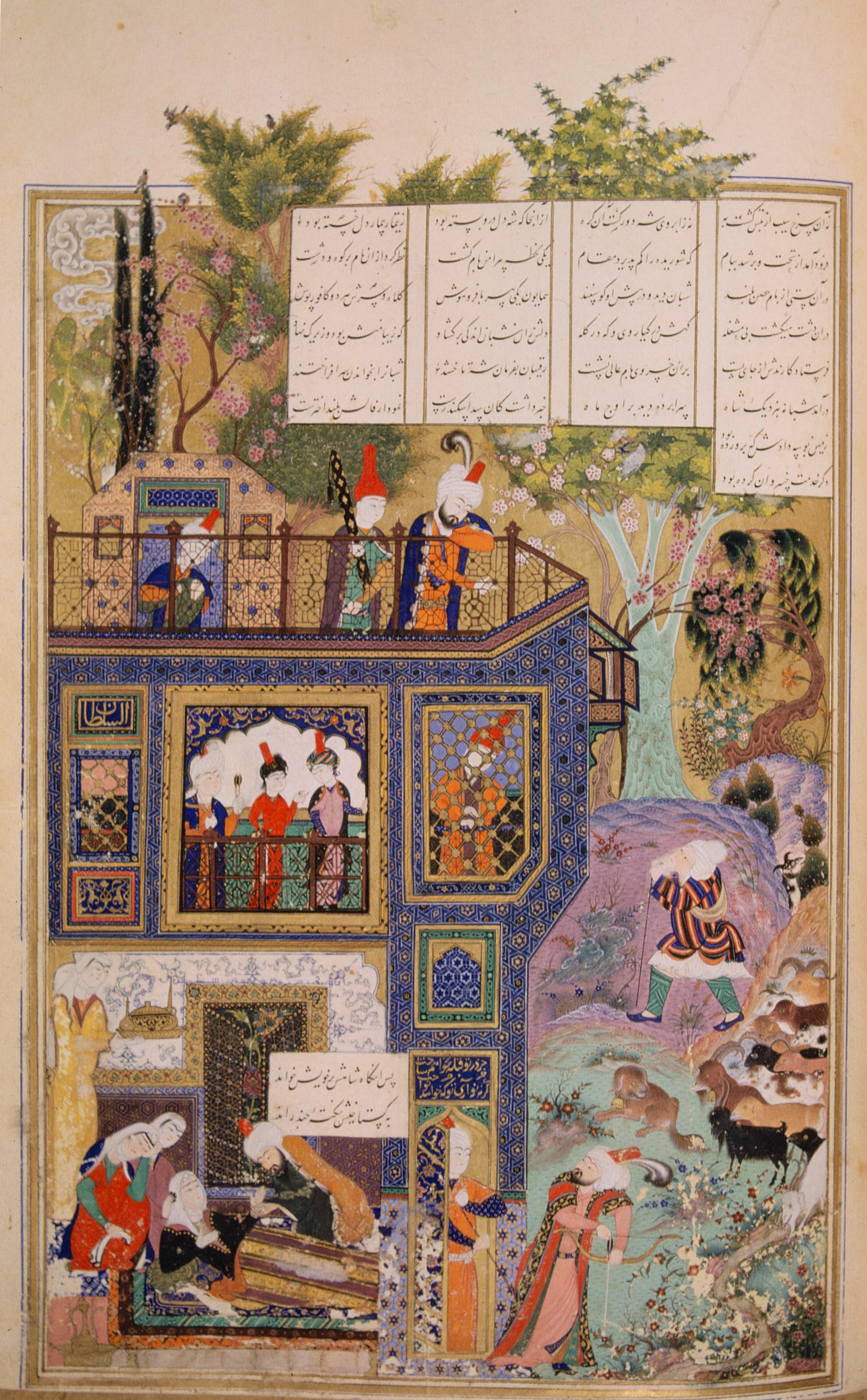
Iskandar conversing with a Shepherd (285r)

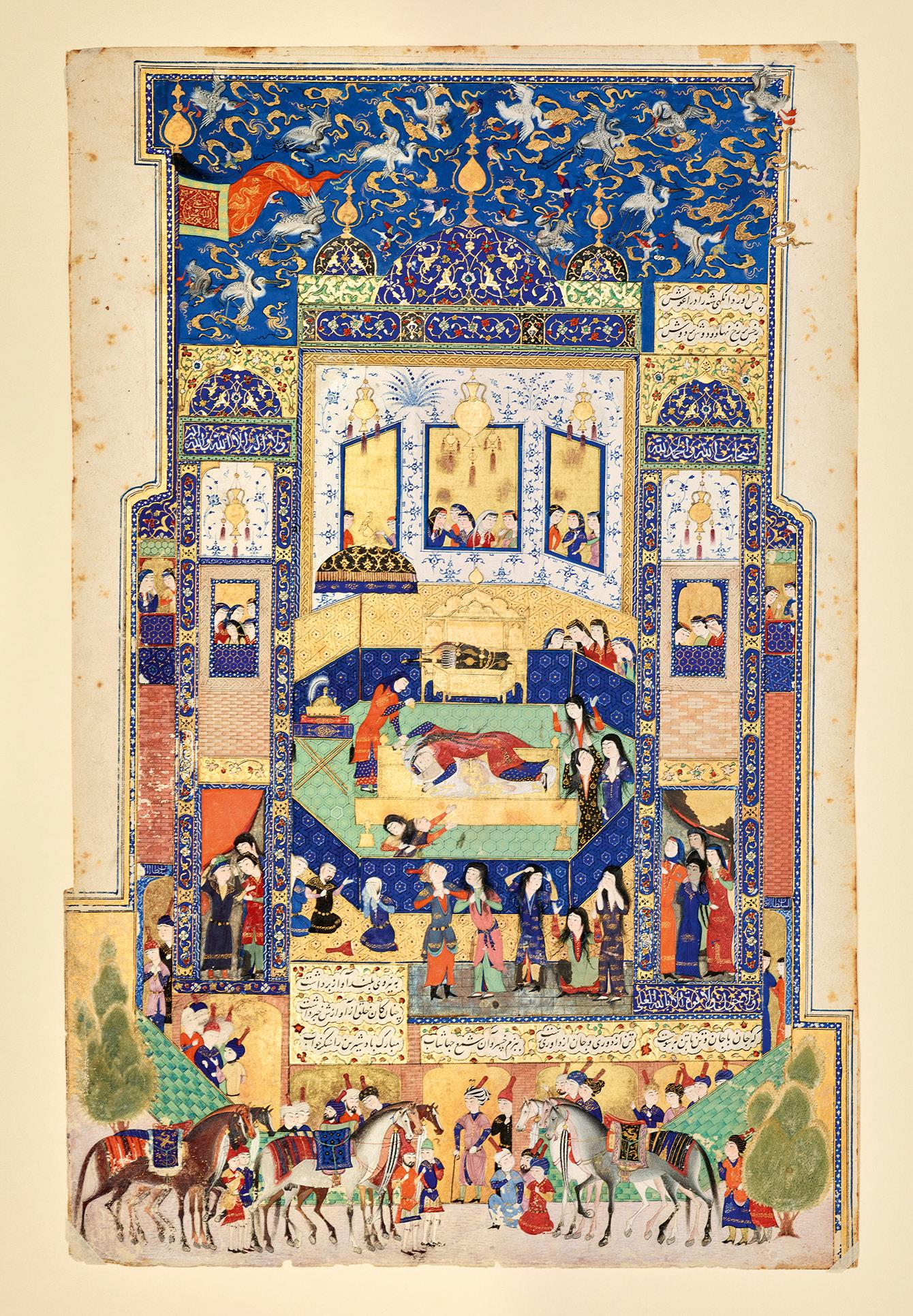
Shirin's Suicide (uncertain folio, Keir collection)

== Sources ==
- Blair, Sheila S.; Bloom, Jonathan M. (25 September 1996). The Art and Architecture of Islam 1250-1800. Yale University Press. p. 68. ISBN 978-0-300-06465-0.
