= Bagratid flag =

Bagratuni flag
- Adopted: 10th century (traditional)
- Design: A gold lion (or leopard) passant on a red field, with a checkered cross above it

The flag of the Bagratunis (Armenian: Բագրատունիների դրոշ) is a medieval Armenian royal symbol associated with the Bagratuni dynasty, which ruled the Kingdom of Armenia from the 9th to the 11th centuries. The tradition of a Bagratuni lion-with-cross standard is based on a relief of a lion on the gates of the medieval Armenian capital of Ani. The symbol features a lion (or leopard) passant with a checkered cross above it, which modern scholars believe to be the emblem of Ani and the Bagratids in general.

== Historical background ==
The Bagratuni dynasty rose to prominence in the 9th century, eventually establishing the Kingdom of Armenia with its capital at Ani from 961 onward. The lion emblem of the Bagratunis was carved on the city wall near the main gate, known as the Avag Dur (Principal Gate). This bas-relief is considered the city emblem of the Bagratunis.

The emblem is said to have been adopted in the 960s, during the reign of King Ashot III the Merciful, when Ani became the capital of the kingdom. The first line of Ani's walls ("Ashotian line") was built in 963–964, and under Ashot's son, Smbat II the Conqueror (977–990), the outer great walls — the "Smbatian line" — were erected, and at the main gate, on the wall, he had the image of the coat of arms placed.

In 855, Ashot Bagratuni was appointed ruler of Armenia, subject to the Arab Caliphate, and in 862 he became prince of princes. In 885, he restored Armenia's independence, lost in 428, and was crowned King of Armenia in his residence of Bagaran by Catholicos Gevorg II Garnetsi.

The Armenian Bagratid kingdom reached its peak of power under King Gagik I (990–1020), when Dvin and Nakhchivan were reconquered, and the Arax again became the border between Armenia and Atropatene.

During the 10th century, in the era of feudal fragmentation, the kingdoms of Vaspurakan, Kars, Tashir-Dzoraget, Syunik, and the principalities of Khachen-Parisos and Taron emerged in Armenia, which were subordinate to the central Bagratid kingdom.

== Description ==
The emblem consists of a lion (or leopard) passant—shown in a walking or striding pose—within a rectangular frame. Above the animal is a checkered cross, symbolizing the union of secular and religious authority.

The lion is depicted with its head turned backward, body elongated, and tail raised. The cross above it is formed by diamond-shaped stones, and a circular indentation in the center represents the orb, a symbol of royal power.

According to heraldist Tigran Hayazn, the symbols of Armenian princely houses, particularly the Bagratunis, were formed over a long historical period, and the leopard on the walls of Ani is one of the best-preserved testimonies to this.

The lower, or first, tier of the coat of arms is a two-story rectangular frame of church type, separated from the common wall by a high frame. In the first tier, or in the large rectangle, a leopard (or panther) with its head turned to the left is sculpted in a running pose. The leopard's body is elongated lengthwise, the long neck is stretched upwards, the back is curved downwards, the left front paw is thrown back, the hind leg is forward, ensuring a realistic run, the tail is parallel to the body, extended in the air. The sculpture is executed in a flat style.

On the stone of the second tier of the frame, a round recess is carved, replacing the orb — the sign of power. From the center of the second-tier frame upwards, as on a church dome, a colored, rhomboid cross is placed. The cross rests on a triangular rhombus. In the center of the central rhombus of the cross, a recess is also carved as a sign of power.

== The lion emblem in Kars ==
The earliest known lion emblem of the Bagratunis is found on the southern facade of the Church of the Holy Apostles in Kars. Kars was made the capital by Abas Bagratuni (928–953), the brother of King Ashot the Iron. The church was built during his reign, between 930 and 943. The lion is depicted within a square, with its head turned to the right, looking at the viewer. As a sign of power, the right front paw is raised upward, and the tail is erect. Since the emblem is on the wall of the Church of the Holy Apostles, it most likely belonged to King Abas.

Subsequent sculptural representations of the emblem were found in Ani. The lion image on the stone slab is executed in a sculptural manner. The lion is turned to the right and exactly repeats the Kars sculpture. More detailed are the sculpted prominent chest, flat mane, thick and pronounced eyebrows, neck, and face.

== Symbolism ==
The lion represents the secular power of the Bagratuni dynasty, while the cross symbolizes the Armenian Apostolic Church and the spiritual authority that legitimized the monarchy. Together, they embody the union of church and state, a central theme of Armenian medieval kingship.

According to heraldic rules, the Bagratuni coat of arms is considered one of the pinnacles of medieval Armenian symbolic art. It reflects the ideology of Armenian statehood, where secular and spiritual powers are intertwined in a single symbolic image.

The symbolism of the Bagratuni flag is multi-layered. The leopard (or lion) as a royal animal symbolizes royal power, bravery and military might. The cross placed above the leopard emphasizes the role of the Christian faith and the church in governing the state.

== Modern usage and controversy ==
The Bagratuni flag has been adopted as a symbol of Armenian heritage and is sometimes used by Armenian diaspora groups. However, its historical authenticity is debated. The tradition of a Bagratuni lion-with-cross standard appears to be modern (possibly Soviet-era), based on the Ani relief and other artistic motifs such as lion-supported thrones.

The original relief on the walls of Ani was significantly altered during a Turkish restoration in the late 1990s. The checkered cross was removed, and the frame was reshaped into a rectangle. This alteration has been criticized as an intentional removal of a Christian symbol, seen by some as part of a campaign to erase the Armenian presence in Anatolia.

The photograph of the relief was taken in the early 20th century, before Turkish restoration work in the late 1990s significantly altered the sculpture: the cross was destroyed, and the frame was turned into a rectangle. According to Heghnar Zeitlian Watenpaugh, the restoration changed the appearance of the city's beloved symbol — the lion sculpture — by removing the colored cross made of rhomboid stones located above the animal. For many observers, this was seen as a deliberate removal of the cross as part of a campaign to erase the traces of Christian Armenian presence.

== See also ==
- Bagratuni dynasty
- Bagratid Armenia
- Ani
- Coat of arms of Armenia
