= Kiurike I =

Kiurike I Գուրգեն Ա
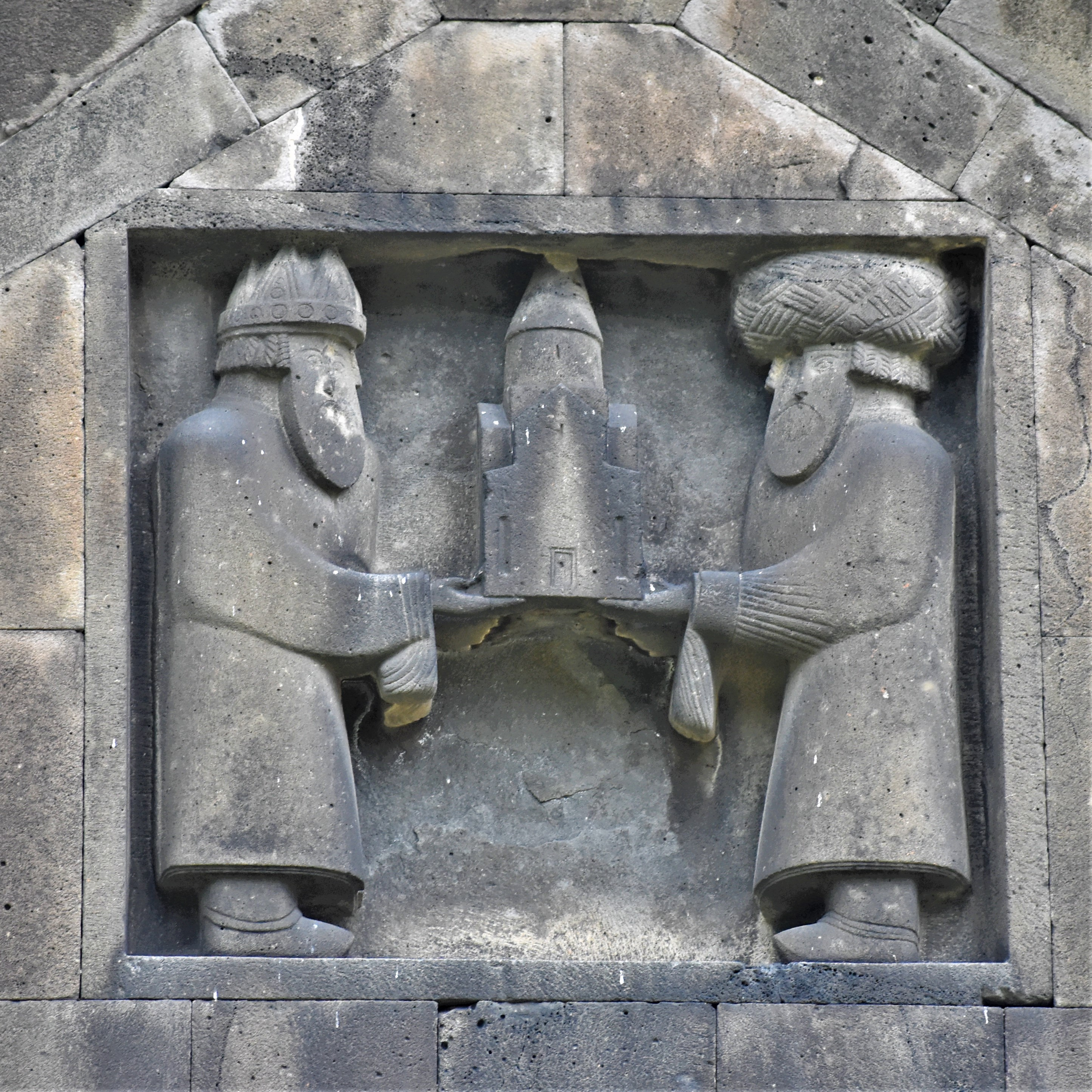
- Kiurike I (left), King of Lori, and his older brother Smbat II, King of Armenia, Haghpat Monastery.

King of Lori
- Reign: 982–989
- Predecessor: position established
- Successor: David I Anhoghin; Smbat I
- Died: 989
- Burial: Sanahin Monastery
- Issue: David I Anhoghin; Smbat I a daughter
- House: Kiurikian
- Father: Ashot III
- Mother: Khosrovanuysh
- Religion: Christianity

Gurgen I Kyurike (Armenian: Գուրգեն Ա Կյուրիկե) was the king of Lori from approximately 970 to 989 and the founder of the Kingdom of Lori (Kyurikian Kingdom).

His name was also pronounced or referred to in the local dialect as Kyurike, from which the dynastic name Kyurikian was derived.

== Biography ==
The Kiurikians were dependent on the Bagratids of Ani and received confirmation of their rights from them. He was the younger son of Ashot III the Merciful. The King of Armenia appointed him ruler of Tashir-Dzoraget, encompassing the basins of the Debed and Aghstev rivers and the adjacent districts.

In 974, he participated in the military campaign led by Ashot III, organized in connection with the Asia Minor expedition of the Byzantine Emperor John I Tzimiskes, when a threat had arisen along the southern borders of Armenia. During the reign of Gurgen Kyurike, the construction of the Holy Mother of God Church of Sanahin and the Holy Sign (Surb Nshan) Church of Haghpat was completed. Their construction had been initiated by his mother, Queen Khosrovanuysh.

Being a deeply devout and religious man, he later voluntarily abdicated the throne and spent eight years as a monk at Sanahin, where he died. He was buried in the Holy Mother of God Church of Sanahin. According to another account, in 989, the year of the death of his brother, Smbat II, King of Ani, Gurgen I, the founder and first king of the Kyurikian Kingdom of Lori, also died. His body was transferred to the royal mausoleum of the Holy Mother of God Church at Sanahin. “Outside, beneath the eastern wall of the Holy Mother of God Church, there is a plain triangular tombstone built of stone. Its beauty, shape, and the traces of arched carvings upon it suggest that an eminent person must be buried here. Approaching the tombstone and clearing away the grass growing around it, one can read the following inscription in one corner of the stone: ‘This is the resting place of Gurgen, son of Ashot the Merciful.’”

Gurgen I had two sons, David and Smbat I. The historian Aristakes Lastivertsi also mentions an unnamed daughter of Gurgen, who married the Emir of Dvin, Apusuarin. Gurgen I was succeeded by his elder son David Anhoghin, with his younger brother Smbat serving as co-ruler. The latter, in practice, took little part in governing the kingdom, leaving its administration entirely to his brother David, who became the most distinguished representative of the Kyurikian dynasty.

== Foundation of the Kingdom ==
As feudal relations deepened in Bagratid Armenia, the growing separatist ambitions of increasingly powerful local princes, combined with the negative influence of external powers, caused the state to embark on a gradual path of fragmentation and decline from the beginning of the 10th century. Political entities began to emerge that often only formally acknowledged the supremacy of the Bagratids of Ani, including local kingdoms and principalities. Among them was the Kyurikian Kingdom of Tashir-Dzoraget. During the early period of the Bagratid Kingdom, Tashir was administered by appointed governors or overseers who did not belong to the royal dynasty. Later, however, in view of their increasingly open separatist aspirations and the necessity of maintaining reliable control over this strategically important region through a member of the royal family, Ashot III the Merciful (953–977) appointed his eldest son Smbat, who had been his co-ruler since at least 958, as governor of Tashir before 972. After Smbat inherited the Armenian throne as sole ruler, he appointed his younger brother Gurgen, who also bore the additional name Derenik, as governor of Tashir in his place. It was Gurgen who, after his uncle Mushegh, founded a new kingdom belonging to the junior branch of the Bagratid dynasty and subordinate to the Bagratids of Ani. The designation Kyurikian, referring both to this local kingdom and its ruling dynasty, derives from the local pronunciation of Gurgen’s name as Kyurike. The establishment of the Kyurikian Kingdom was a gradual process, and the date of its proclamation remains disputed in historiography, with proposed dates ranging from 966 to 988. This is largely because, among the primary sources, only Mkhitar Ayrivanetsi records the year in which Gurgen became king. According to him, this occurred in 981. The other two authors who mention the event—the anonymous chronicler, presumed to have lived in the 12th century, and Vardan Vardapet—do not provide a date. According to the anonymous chronicler, after Ashot III’s death, his sons Smbat, Gagik, and Gurgen “amicably divided the kingdom among themselves, recognizing Smbat as the head of the family.” According to Vardan, Ashot III died “leaving three sons, Smbat, Gagik, and Gurgen; on that very day the eldest son Smbat received the crown… while the younger brother inherited Tashir together with the Sevordik and Dzoraget.”

Thus, according to all three primary sources mentioned above, Gurgen became king only after his father’s death—that is, after 977. This is clearly confirmed by a memorandum written in 979 by Simeon, secretary and scribe of Sanahin Monastery, in which Gurgen is referred to as “the prince of the land of Tashir.” In the inscription on a khachkar in the cemetery of Kurthan village, dated 986, Gurgen already appears under the name Kyurike with the royal title. It is true that Matthew of Edessa refers to Gurgen as the “King of Albania” in connection with the military campaign organized by Ashot III in 974 against the expedition of Emperor John I Tzimiskes, listing him among the participating rulers. However, this is an anachronism, since at that time the Kyurikians possessed no territories in Aghvank. Furthermore, among the rulers listed by Matthew, Abas became King of Kars only in 984, while Senekerim ascended the throne of Vaspurakan in 1003. As for King Philip of Kapan, who is also mentioned in the same list, he was in fact one of the princes of Artsakh. Therefore, the Kyurikian Kingdom of Tashir-Dzoraget must have been established after the death of Ashot III, between 979 and 985. Taking all the available evidence into account, the date proposed by Mkhitar Ayrivanetsi should be accepted, and Gurgen’s proclamation as king of Tashir-Dzoraget should be dated to 981. One might suppose that this event resulted from the weakening of the central Bagratid authority and associate it with the invasion of Armenia by the Sallarid Emir of Atropatene, Abu al-Hayja, in 982, thereby dating the proclamation to that year. However, although Abu al-Hayja—who invaded Armenia at the instigation of Mushegh, King of Kars-Vanand—captured Dvin, advanced into Shirak, and devastated Horomos Monastery, he was defeated and taken prisoner in battle against Abutlup, Emir of Goghtn, who had been sent against him by Smbat II. Moreover, Smbat II’s authority did not suffer any significant weakening. Consequently, the year 981, indicated by Mkhitar Ayrivanetsi, should be accepted as the year of the proclamation of the Kyurikian Kingdom of Tashir-Dzoraget.

As is evident from the above-mentioned chronicle, Gurgen recognized the supremacy of his elder brother and received part of the paternal inheritance on the condition of his unconditional submission to him. The boundaries of the Kyurikian Kingdom of Tashir-Dzoraget are known from the testimonies of the anonymous chronicler, presumed to have lived in the 12th century, Vardan Vardapet, and Mkhitar Ayrivanetsi, and especially from a decree of Smbat II (977–991), dated 979. According to the anonymous chronicler, Gurgen ruled over “the lands of Gugark, beginning from Gag, Kharra, as far as the Gates of Tiflis.” According to Vardan Vardapet, he received “Tashir together with the Sevordiks and Dzoraget; Kayen and Kaytson; Khorkhorunik, where Khora was built, namely Khozhorni and Khorakert; and Bazunik, that is Bazkert in the district of Tashir, together with other famous fortresses.” Mkhitar Ayrivanetsi confines himself to the brief statement: “Gurgen ruled in Virk (Georgia), and his brother Smbat ruled in Armenia.” The future boundaries of the Kyurikian Kingdom of Tashir-Dzoraget are described in greater detail in the decree issued by Smbat II during his visit to Sanahin in 979. The kingdom extended from the valleys of the Pambak and Aghstev rivers to the vicinity of Tiflis, as well as to the Tsaghkunyats Mountain Range and the district of Nig. To the north it bordered the Bagratid Kingdom of Georgia and the Arab Emirate of Tiflis; to the south, the principality of the Pahlavunis; to the east, Armenian territories under the rule of the Shaddadids; and to the west, the core domains of the Bagratids of Ani.

The region entrusted by Smbat II to Gurgen as governor and overseer constituted a separate administrative and political unit and therefore required a corresponding ecclesiastical organization—a diocesan jurisdiction encompassing its entire territory. By the mid-960s, after the construction of the Church of the Holy Savior (Amenaprkich) at Sanahin Monastery, Ashot III and Queen Khosrovanuysh had granted estates to the monastery, which became the center of the ecclesiastical diocese of Tashir, with the Church of the Holy Savior serving as its cathedral. By 970, the head of this diocese was Bishop Grigor, as confirmed by the above-mentioned testimony of Simeon, dated 972: “During the episcopate in our province of Tashir of the worthy shepherd Bishop Grigor, who had already held this office for two years.” However, the newly established administrative unit entrusted to Gurgen covered a considerably larger territory than that previously administered by Smbat, while the jurisdiction of the Diocese of Tashir did not extend over all its districts. According to established practice, the boundaries of secular and ecclesiastical authority within any administrative unit were expected to coincide. The need to eliminate this discrepancy, together with Smbat II’s desire to make the Holy Mother of God Church, the burial place of his ancestors, rather than the Church of the Holy Savior, the cathedral of the newly established diocese, explains his visit to Sanahin in 979 and the issuance of the corresponding decree.

By this decree, through Catholicos Khachik I, Smbat II elevated the Holy Mother of God Church of Sanahin to the status of cathedral of the ecclesiastical organization encompassing the territories entrusted to Gurgen and established a new diocese under the leadership of Bishop Isaiah. It included: “The whole land of Tashir, Upper and Lower, from Mount Bazum on both sides to the borders of Gugark, to the frontiers of Tiflis and Georgia, to the borders of the district of Nig, to the boundaries of Kayen, to the borders of Tsaghkots, and as far as the borders of the house of Shirak.”

After the capital of the Armenian state was transferred to Ani and the Armenian kingdom became stronger, autonomous principalities and kingdoms began to emerge that recognized the supremacy of the Bagratids of Ani, while maintaining internal independence. Tashir was administered by appointed governors who did not belong to the royal dynasty. Taking into account the separatist ambitions of local princes and the strategic importance of the region, Ashot III the Merciful (953–977) appointed his eldest son and co-ruler, Smbat, as governor of Tashir. Smbat ruled Gugark for fourteen years, from 958 to 972. After becoming king, Smbat appointed his younger brother Gurgen, also known as Gurgen-Derenik, as governor of Tashir..

Following the death of his father in 977, Gurgen apparently became the sole ruler of the region. However, the new king, Smbat II the Conqueror (also known as Smbat the Universal Ruler), formally recognized Gurgen as king in 982. The newly established Kyurikian Kingdom of Tashir-Dzoraget included not only the entire former administrative district of Tashir but also a number of adjacent territories.

Gurgen Kyurike continued the construction and embellishment of the monastic complexes of Sanahin and Haghpat, as evidenced by his donation of two large and magnificent chandeliers to Sanahin Monastery. In 988, he participated in Smbat II’s military campaign against King Smbat of Abkhazia, supporting David Kuropalates and King Bagrat III of Georgia.

Smbat II died under suspicious circumstances. The middle brother, Gagik I (990–1020), who ascended the throne afterward, confirmed both his younger brother Gurgen and his uncle Mushegh, King of Kars-Vanand, in their respective thrones, on the condition that they acknowledge his supremacy. Being a deeply pious and devout man, Gurgen later voluntarily abdicated the throne, spent eight years as a monk in Sanahin, and died there. He was buried in the Holy Mother of God Church of Sanahin. He had two sons, David and Smbat.

== Construction of the Sanahin Monastic Complex ==
The first church of the monastery, the Holy Mother of God (Surb Astvatsatsin) Church, was built in the 930s–940s, during the reign of King Abas I Bagratuni. In 966, King Ashot III the Merciful and Queen Khosrovanuysh built the Church of the Holy Savior (Surb Amenaprkich) for the prosperity and long life of their sons, Kyurike (Gurgen) and Smbat. They also founded a monastic brotherhood and a higher ecclesiastical school, inviting clergymen, learned vardapets (doctors of the Church), and manuscript scribes. The first abbot of the monastery was Polycarpos, who was succeeded by the scholar-vardapet Hovhannes.

In 979, by decree of King Smbat II, the Sanahin Monastic Complex became the episcopal seat of the newly established Kyurikian Kingdom (remaining so until the middle of the 11th century), and Isaiah was ordained as Bishop of the Diocese of Tashir. Among its distinguished abbots was Dioskoros of Sanahin, known as the “Great Orator,” who led the monastery from 1039 to 1063. During his tenure, the scriptorium and the Chapel of Saint Gregory were constructed. The ecclesiastical school developed into a major educational center, the library was enriched, and numerous manuscripts were written, illuminated, and copied. Among his pupils, as well as scholars who taught and worked at the school, were the learned monks Anania of Sanahin and Hakobos Karapnetsi. Besides theology, the curriculum included philosophy, rhetoric, music, medicine, chronology (calendar studies), and other sciences. According to tradition, Grigor Magistros Pahlavuni also taught at the school. The hall constructed between the Holy Mother of God and Holy Savior churches was consequently named the “Magistros Academy (Magistros Seminary).”

During the second half of the 11th century, with the beginning of the Seljuk invasions and throughout Seljuk domination, as well as after the fall of the Kyurikian Kingdom in 1113, Sanahin Monastery experienced a prolonged period of decline. At the end of the 12th century, after becoming the property of the Zakarian princes as part of the district of Tashir, the monastery regained its prominent role in the religious, educational, and cultural life of the country. During this period, extensive construction was also undertaken. From the 1180s until the 1230s, the following structures were built: the gavits (narthexes) of the Holy Savior and Holy Mother of God churches, the bell tower, the outer hall of the scriptorium, a guesthouse (which has not survived), the hereditary mausoleum of the Zakarian family. At the same time, the highly artistic khachkars of Grigor Tuteordi and Sargis were erected, and the Holy Savior Church was restored. At the end of the 12th century, the famous Sanahin Bridge over the Debed River was constructed, carrying the road leading to the monastery, while a public fountain was also built in the village.

During the 12th and 13th centuries, notable abbots of Sanahin included Grigor Tuteordi, Hovhannes Khachentsi (teacher of the Zakarian princes Zakare and Ivane), and Vardan. Particularly renowned was Abbot Grigor Rabunapet, whose work “The Broad and Subtle Explanation of the Scriptures, Drawn from the Holy Fathers and the Doctors of the Church” also served as a textbook. Grigor Rabunapet donated thirteen manuscripts to the monastery and authored several other scholarly works. The normal life of the monastery was again disrupted by the Mongol invasions, which began in the 1230s, and continued throughout the period of Mongol rule. At the beginning of the 14th century, the power of the Zakarian princely house declined, and by the end of the century it had fragmented. As a result, the village of Sanahin, together with its surrounding lands and monastery, became the property of the Arghutyan-Yerkaynabazuk family, descendants of the Zakarians, remaining in their possession until the beginning of the 20th century.

During the 14th and 15th centuries, the art of manuscript copying flourished once again at Sanahin Monastery. Of the manuscripts copied there, 35 are preserved today in the Matenadaran. Particularly noteworthy is the “Kotuk” of Sanahin (Manuscript No. 3032), which contains the monastery’s chronicle and valuable information concerning the history of its monastic brotherhood.

In the mid-17th century, during the leadership of Archbishop Sargis Arghutyan, the monastery’s principal buildings, which had suffered damage from time and earthquakes, underwent extensive restoration. In 1831, Archbishop Harutyun Ter-Barseghyants, the hereditary head of the monastery, built a single-arched fountain adjoining the northern wall. Its poetic inscription, composed by him, has been preserved on the façade. He also carried out the decipherment of inscriptions and restoration work on the monastery’s buildings. At the beginning of the 20th century, the monastery ceased to function as an active religious institution.

During the Soviet period, Sanahin Monastery was protected by the state as a historical and cultural monument, and structural reinforcement and restoration work was carried out. In 1998, by a decision of the Government of the Republic of Armenia, the monastery was transferred to the administration of the Mother See of Holy Etchmiadzin.

According to popular etymology, the name “Sanahin” means “this is older than that (Haghpat),” or alternatively “old cauldron” (san-hin). Together with Haghpat Monastery, Sanahin is inscribed on the UNESCO World Heritage List.

== Construction of the Haghpat Monastic Complex ==
The monastery’s first church, the Church of the Holy Sign (Surb Nshan), together with its monastic brotherhood, was founded in 976 by King Ashot III Bagratuni and his wife Queen Khosrovanuysh for the prosperity and long life of their sons, KIurike (Gurgen) and Smbat. The founding abbot was Simeon, who, together with the elder Tiranun, supervised the construction of the church, completed in 991, and established the monastery’s ecclesiastical school. Learned monks and teachers were invited from Sanahin Monastery and other centers, and before long the total number of monks in these two monasteries of the Kyurikian Kingdom reached 500. During the first quarter of the 11th century, two chapel-mausoleums (1005–1020) were built against the northern wall of the Church of the Holy Sign, along with the Church of Saint Gregory (1005) and the monastery’s original defensive wall. In the 11th century, the monastery’s scriptorium was also constructed; its original wooden roof was later rebuilt in stone.

In 1064, King Kyurike I Bagratuni of Tashir-Dzoraget, after recognizing the supremacy of the Seljuk Turks, succeeded in preserving his kingdom and its spiritual centers in a semi-independent status. At the same time, he transferred the episcopal see from Sanahin to Haghpat, where in 1081 he supported Bishop Barsegh of Ani-Shirak in his consecration as Catholicosal Locum Tenens (he later became Catholicos Barsegh I of Ani, Catholicos of All Armenians from 1105 to 1113). Bishop Sargis was appointed head of the ecclesiastical diocese of the Kyurikian Kingdom at Haghpat. In 1105, Emir Qizil attacked, devastated, and plundered numerous settlements and monasteries, including the monastic communities of Sanahin and Haghpat.

== Kiurikian dinasty ==
Name	Years	Notes
Kiurike I	982-989	Brother og Smbat II, King of Tashir Dzoraget
David Anhoghin	989-1050	Son of Kiurike I, King of Tashir Dzoraget
Kiurike II	1050-1089	Son of David Anhoghin, King of Tashir Dzoraget
Abas I	1089-1113	Son of Kiurike II, King of Tashir Dzoraget
	1113-1145	Trout of Tavush
David II	1089-1113	Son of Kiurike II, King of Tashir Dzoraget
	1113-1145	Trout of Matsnaberd
Kiurike III	1145-1170	Trout of Matsnaberd
Abas II	1170-1176	Trout of Matsnaberd
Aghsartan I	1176-	Trout of Matsnaberd
Aghsartan II		Trout of Matsnaberd
Taghiadin I		Trout of Matsnaberd
Sargis I		Trout of Matsnaberd

== See also ==
Kiurikian dynasty

== Sources ==
- Grousset, René (1947). Histoire de l’Arménie des origines à 1071 (in French). Paris: Payot.
- Toumanoff Cyrille. Les dynasties de la Caucasie chrétienne de l'Antiquité jusqu'au. — Rome, 1990.
- Ստեփանոս Տարոնեցի (Ասողիկ), Պատմութիւն տիեզերական, ՍՊԲ, 1885.
- Մատթեոս Ուռհայեցի, Ժամանակագրություն, Վաղարշապատ,1898․
- Արիստակես Լաստիվերցի, Պատմություն, Երևան, 1663․
- «Լօռիի Կիւրիկեան թագաւորներու պատմութիւնը», Ղևոնդ Մովսիսյան, Վիեննա, 1923, էջ 24, 26-28․

Kiurike I Kingdom of Tashir-Dzoraget Born: ? Died: 989
Preceded by Kingdom established	King of Lori; 982-989	Succeeded by David I Anhoghin; Smbat I
