= Smbat II of Armenia =

King of Armenia from 977 to 989

Smbat II Սմբատ Բ
- King of Armenia; King of Ani
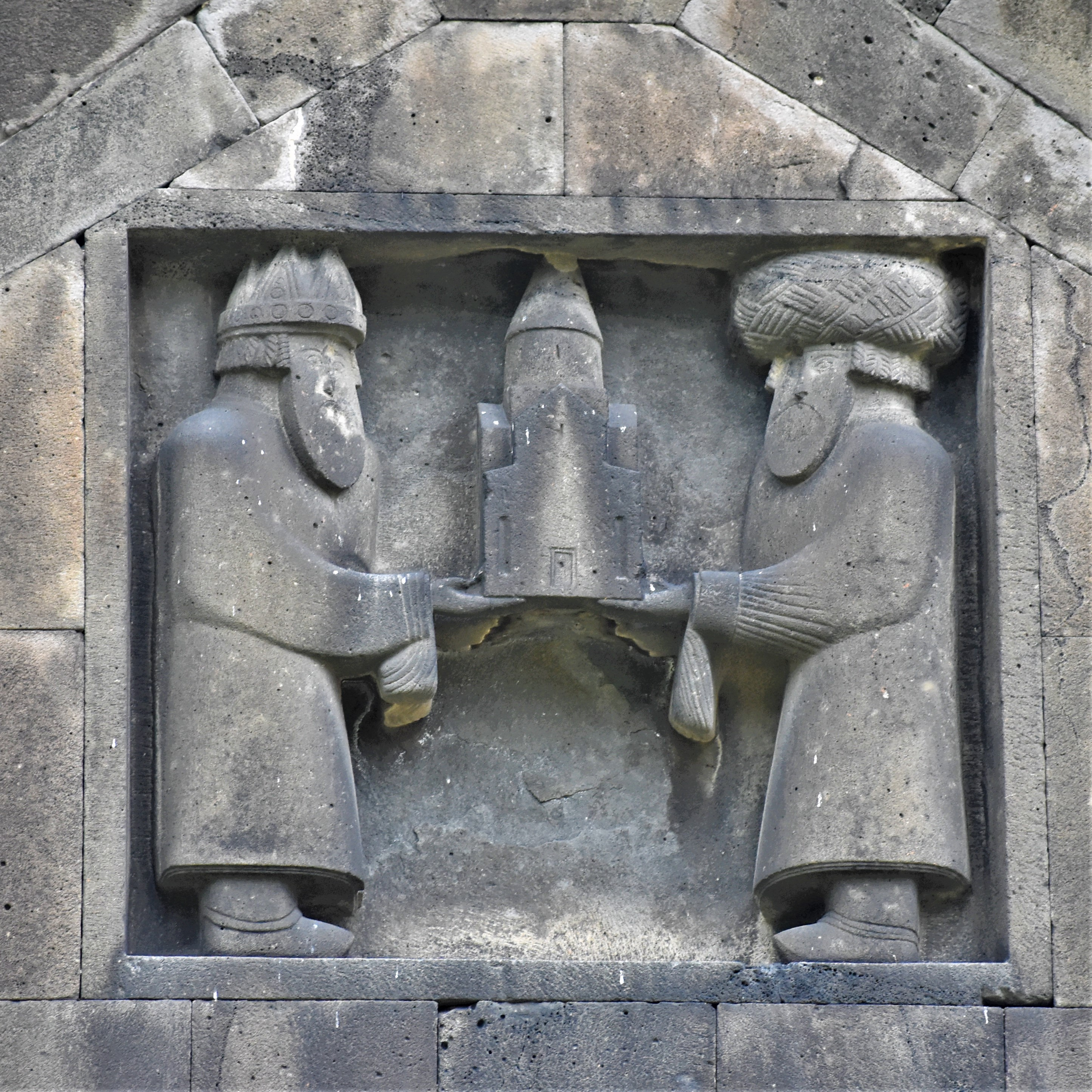
- Smbat II Bagratuni (right), King of Armenia, and his younger brother Gurgen (Kiurike) I, King of Lori, Haghpat Monastery.

King of Armenia
- Reign: 977–89
- Predecessor: Ashot III
- Successor: Gagik I
- Died: 989; Ani
- Burial: Ani
Names
- Smbat II Bagratuni
- Dynasty: Bagratuni
- Father: Ashot III
- Mother: Khosrovanuysh
- Religion: Armenian Apostolic

Smbat II the Master of the Universe was a king of Armenia from the Bagratuni dynasty. He was the son of Ashot III the Merciful and Queen Khosrovanuysh, and the brother of Gagik I and Gurgen. In primary sources, he is mentioned with the titles “Master of the Universe” and “Shahanshah of Ani”.

The reign of Smbat II coincided with the deepening political fragmentation of Bagratid Armenia, the increasing activity of neighbouring Muslim emirates, and the reorganisation of the eastern policy of the Byzantine Empire. During his reign, the kingdoms of Tashir, Parisos, and Syunik were created or took their final form, although their rulers continued to recognise the supremacy of the Shahanshah of Ani. Smbat II’s most notable undertaking was the construction of Ani’s new defensive system, the Smbatashen Walls. The Cathedral of Ani was also founded during his reign, and its construction was completed by Queen Katranide during the reign of Gagik I.

== Origin and accession to the throne ==
Smbat was the eldest son of Ashot III the Merciful. According to the contemporary historian Stepanos Taronetsi Asoghik, immediately after the death of Ashot III, his son Smbat ascended the throne and ruled for thirteen years. Based on a comparison of the data of the movable Armenian calendar, Ashot III’s death is dated to 3 January 978, and Smbat’s reign therefore began at the beginning of 978.

The view that Smbat had already been his father’s co-ruler from 958 has occasionally been advanced in historiography. This opinion was based mainly on the phrase “the residence of Smbat, king of the Armenians”, mentioned in the work of Anania Mokatsi. However, the reference concerns not Smbat, the son of Ashot III, but Shirakavan, also known as Yerazgavors, the former residence of Smbat I. The wording of contemporary and later historians, according to which Smbat became king on the very day of his father’s death, likewise does not support the co-rulership hypothesis.

== Political situation at the beginning of the reign ==
Smbat II ascended the throne under circumstances in which the territorial and military foundations of the Bagratid kingdom had been significantly weakened. Byzantium had already taken possession of Taron, separate claims to royal precedence continued to exist among the Artsrunis of the Kingdom of Vaspurakan, and a separate Bagratid kingdom had been established in Kars in 975. Local principalities were becoming stronger within the kingdom, while the Muslim emirates to the south and south-east were being reorganised.

The Arab Caliphate had lost effective control over most of its Middle Eastern territories. The Buyids had acquired a dominant position in Baghdad, the Sallarids and Rawwadids were competing in Azerbaijan, and the emirates of Goghtn, Dvin, and Manzikert remained influential within Armenia. At the same time, David the Curopalate and Bagrat III, the future founder of a united Georgian kingdom, had become more powerful in the South Caucasus.

== Reconstruction of Ani and its defensive system ==
=== The Smbatashen Walls ===
Smbat II’s first major undertaking was the protection of the new districts of Ani that had spread beyond the Ashotashen wall. Asoghik reports that the king constructed a new, towering wall with towers and strongly fortified gates, extending from the gorge of the Akhurian River to Tsaghkotsadzor. In the work “History of the City of Ani”, the foundation of the wall is dated to the year 428 of the Armenian calendar, corresponding to the period between March 979 and March 980. The same account associates the construction with the fourth year of the reign of Emperor Basil II and the first year of Smbat II’s reign. Samuel of Ani likewise emphasises that construction of the wall began immediately after Smbat’s accession to the throne.

Toros Toramanian considered that work on such a scale would have required between five and ten years, while Marie Brosset suggested a period of approximately eight years. On the basis of these estimates, the principal stage of construction is placed approximately between 979 and 989.

According to Toramanian’s measurements, the Smbatashen wall was more than 2,500 metres long and reached a height of 8–10 metres. Towers were constructed along the wall at intervals of 10–20 metres. Most were semicircular, although square-plan towers were also found in the areas of Igadzor and Gayladzor. Ani’s defensive system included dozens of towers and numerous gates and passages. The principal entrances included the Great Gate, the Kars Gate, and the Dvin Gate. A sculpture of a leopard, regarded as one of the heraldic symbols of Ani, was placed above the Great Gate.

A lower second wall existed in front of the main wall, and some sources also mention a broad moat that could be filled with water. The expression “double wall” may mean either a “second” wall or a “paired” wall, and several researchers therefore consider the Smbatashen system to have originally consisted of two lines of fortification. In accounts of the siege of Ani in 1064, the city’s fortifications are described as exceptionally powerful and difficult to penetrate.

=== Urban development programme and the architect Trdat ===
The relationship between the locations of the Smbatashen walls, the bridges over the Akhurian River, the principal streets, and the Cathedral of Ani has provided grounds for the assumption that a unified urban development programme was implemented during Smbat II’s reign. Its designer and construction supervisor is considered to have been Trdat the Architect. According to S. Mnatsakanian, Trdat not only designed the fortification wall but also developed the general plan of the new city, with a principal axis extending from the main Smbatashen entrance towards the city centre and the cathedral.

Settlement and construction in the new part of Ani had begun earlier, but during Smbat II’s reign the area received a unified defensive and urban system. These works contributed to the rapid growth of the capital and transformed it into a city described by contemporaries as “world-renowned” or “universal”.

=== Foundation of the Cathedral of Ani ===
According to Asoghik, Smbat II laid the foundations of a great church in Ani through the work of the architect Trdat. The cathedral was constructed outside the Ashotashen wall, in the central part of the new city, and its foundation must therefore have followed the principal construction stage of the Smbatashen defensive system. One of the most widely accepted dates for its foundation is 989.

In August 989, an earthquake in Constantinople damaged Hagia Sophia. Trdat was invited to the imperial capital and directed the restoration of its dome. Construction of the Cathedral of Ani was probably temporarily suspended because of his departure. After the death of Smbat II, the work was continued and completed by Queen Katranide, the wife of Gagik I. An inscription in the Cathedral of Ani states that the queen completed the cathedral founded by “the great Smbat”.

== “Master of the Universe” and other titles ==
Smbat II’s title “Master of the Universe” did not literally signify dominion over the entire world. It was part of the titular tradition of the Bagratid court and had first been used with significant political meaning during the reign of Smbat I. Smbat I had established supremacy over several rulers of Armenia and Christian Transcaucasia, and the title “Master of the Universe” therefore emphasised regional overlordship.

In a colophon dated 965, the Byzantine emperor is called “Master of the Universe”, while Abusahl-Hamazasp, king of Vaspurakan, is called the “second Master of the Universe”. This usage indicates a particular hierarchy: the emperor was regarded as the supreme ruler of the entire Christian world, while the Armenian king was the overlord of regional kings who were subordinate to or allied with him.

In his charter of 979, Smbat II presents himself as a descendant of Smbat I, the “Master of the Universe and great king”, without repeating the title beside his own name. This shows that Smbat II bore the title by virtue of inheritance and court tradition, regarding Smbat I as its original and authoritative holder.

The form “Shahanshah of Ani” is also mentioned among his titles. The title “shahanshah”, or “king of kings”, emphasised the supremacy of the king of Ani over the kingdoms of Kars, Tashir, and the other local Armenian kingdoms.

== Relations with the Kingdom of Kars ==
During the first years of Smbat II’s reign, relations with his uncle, King Mushegh of Kars, became strained. The subject of the conflict was the fortress of Shatik, near which an important commercial road passed through the Aghtodzor mountain pass of the Armenian Range. The fortress also had customs significance.

Smbat captured Shatik, but Mushegh appealed to David the Curopalate for assistance. The combined forces of Kars and Tao advanced into Shirak and halted in the Bava Valley. Smbat II did not enter into a large-scale war and returned the fortress to Mushegh in exchange for peace. Asoghik specifically states that, owing to the peaceful disposition of David the Curopalate, Smbat’s country was not subjected to devastation. The event is dated approximately to the period between 978 and 982.

In 982, the army of the Sallarid Abu al-Hayja invaded Shirak and devastated Horomos Monastery. Asoghik’s account indicates that the emir had previously been summoned by Mushegh but had failed to join the forces of Kars and Tao in time. Despite this crisis, relations between Ani and Kars were later normalised. After Mushegh’s death in 984, the accession of his son Abas was confirmed with the consent of the supreme king of Ani.

== Deepening fragmentation of the Bagratid kingdom ==
=== Foundation of the Kingdom of Tashir ===
Following the death of Ashot III, his sons divided their father’s domains, recognising Smbat as the “head of the family”, meaning the supreme authority of the dynasty and its subordinate rulers. Gurgen received the extensive territories of Tashir and the surrounding districts. Based on a comparison between the memorial record of Sanahin Monastery and Smbat II’s charter of 979, the most likely date for Gurgen’s proclamation as king is 978.

The Kingdom of Tashir included the eastern part of Gugark, Tashir, the district of Dzoraget, and neighbouring fortresses, extending to Kayan, Kaytson, Khorakert, and, in the north, to the borders of Tiflis. Gurgen’s kingdom was formed not as the result of a rebellion against Smbat II, but through the division of the Bagratid royal domains and the creation of a subordinate royal authority. Gurgen and his successors recognised the overlordship of the Shahanshah of Ani.

=== Kingdom of Parisos ===
The Kingdom of Parisos was formed in the eastern regions of Armenia on the basis of the authority of the descendants of Sahak Sevada, who ruled Gardman and the surrounding districts. Movses Daskhurantsi reports that Hovhannes-Senekerim was proclaimed king and received crowns from the “king of Persia” and David the Magistros.

The expression “king of Persia” is identified with the Buyid ruler Adud al-Dawla, while David the Magistros is identified with David the Curopalate. The most likely date for the proclamation of the Kingdom of Parisos is considered to be 982, when Smbat II’s central authority was under pressure from the actions of Kars, Tao, and the Sallarids. Senekerim’s brother Grigor is likewise mentioned in the sources as the lord or king of Parisos.

=== Establishment of the Kingdom of Syunik ===
The principal source concerning the foundation of the Kingdom of Syunik is the history of Stepanos Orbelian. According to his account, Smbat Sahakyan, the presiding prince of Syunik, established diplomatic relations with the ruler of Tabriz, the emir of Shirvan, the rulers of Aghvank, and the supreme Buyid ruler, after which he was crowned.

The date of the proclamation of the kingdom has been interpreted in different ways in historiography, ranging from the 970s to 987. However, a comparison of the chronology of the sources and the fact that the Rawwadids still ruled only Tabriz provide grounds for placing the coronation at approximately 983. Although Smbat of Syunik was crowned with the support of external powers, he did not sever his ties with the court of Ani. During the campaign of 988, the army of Syunik participated in the united Armenian army led by Smbat II, demonstrating that the supremacy of the Shahanshah of Ani was maintained.

In its initial period, the Kingdom of Syunik included most of the districts of the province of Syunik: Vayots Dzor, Tsghuk, Chahuk, Haband, Yernjak, Dzork, Baghk, Arevik, and Kovsakan. Gegharkunik remained under direct Bagratid rule, while Sotk and Aghahechk were connected with the princes of Khachen.

== Relations with Byzantium and Tao ==
At the beginning of Smbat II’s reign, Byzantium was occupied with suppressing internal rebellions. During the rebellion of Bardas Skleros, Emperor Basil II appealed to David the Curopalate for assistance. David sent 12,000 cavalrymen to the emperor and, in return, received lifetime possession of a number of districts in western and central Armenia, in the direction of Karin, Basean, and the neighbouring regions.

Byzantine sources describe the territories granted to David as lands liberated from rebels and bestowed by the empire. Their legal status was not hereditary: after David’s death, the territories were to pass to the empire. This condition subsequently became one of the important foundations for Byzantine expansion into Armenian and Georgian territories.

Relations between Smbat II and David the Curopalate were initially tense because of the issue of Kars, but cooperation later developed between them. David had become one of the most influential rulers of the South Caucasus, while Smbat was the supreme king of the Armenian kingdoms. Their interests coincided in maintaining the regional balance of power.

== Participation in the politics of the South Caucasus ==
In 978, David the Curopalate and Smbat II supported Bagrat III’s establishment on the throne of Abkhazia. This step contributed to the process of uniting Abkhazia and Kartli and to the future creation of a unified Georgian kingdom.

The subsequent strengthening of Bagrat III came into conflict with the interests of David the Curopalate. Around 988, Bagrat III’s army marched against David. David appealed for assistance to Smbat II and to the Georgian king Bagrat of Khevi. Smbat assembled a united Armenian army that also included troops from subordinate kingdoms and principalities. The concentration of forces was sufficient to persuade Bagrat III to abandon the war and conclude peace. In return for his support, Smbat II received the fortress of Sakuret.

This intervention demonstrates that during the final years of his reign, Smbat II had restored a considerable part of his authority. Although Bagratid Armenia had been divided into several kingdoms, the Shahanshah of Ani was able, when necessary, to assemble a pan-Armenian army and act as a regional mediator.

== Relations with the Muslim emirates ==
=== The Sallarids and the Emirate of Goghtn ===
In 982, after invading Shirak, the Sallarid Abu al-Hayja fought against Abu Dulaf, the emir of Goghtn, was defeated, and was taken prisoner. In exchange for his freedom, he lost Dvin and the other cities of Armenia. Abu Dulaf subsequently controlled Dvin until 987.

For a time, Smbat II had an alliance with the emir of Goghtn confirmed by an oath, but he attempted to support the deposed Sallarid emir. Asoghik presents this act as a violation of an oath, although it may have been a diplomatic attempt to counterbalance the growing power of the emir of Goghtn and establish control over Dvin. The plan was not carried out, and Smbat later renewed his alliance with the emir of Goghtn through the mediation of Catholicos Khachik I.

=== Pressure from the Rawwadids ===
From 983, the Rawwadids became the dominant power in Azerbaijan. Smbat II probably assumed a formal tributary obligation towards them from around that time, although he did not pay the tribute regularly. In 987, the Rawwadid Abu al-Hayja attacked the Emirate of Goghtn with a large army, captured the former Sallarid cities and Dvin, and then demanded from Smbat the tribute owed for previous years. The Armenian king sent the tribute together with valuable gifts and thereby prevented the hostile army from invading his immediate domains.

After the death of the Rawwadid emir in 988, the emir of Goghtn regained control of Dvin and concluded an alliance with Smbat II. As a result, the Kingdom of Ani was temporarily freed from direct pressure from Azerbaijan and secured its southern frontiers. The widespread view that Dvin was annexed to Smbat II’s domains lacks a firm basis in the sources: during the late 980s, the city continued to pass from one Muslim emir to another.

== Final years of the reign ==
Asoghik writes that Smbat II’s “internal and external affairs succeeded”, while the abundance of bread and wine increased in the country. This statement has been interpreted as an indication of economic revival and political stabilisation.

By the end of the 980s, the local kings who had earlier acquired independence with external support had once again united around the Shahanshah of Ani. Smbat II had also begun to expand the royal domains towards Vayots Dzor, Khachen, and Parisos. According to Asoghik, Gagik I subsequently made greater conquests in these directions than his brother, suggesting that the initial steps of expansion had already been undertaken during Smbat II’s reign.

== Death and burial ==
The principal details concerning the death of Smbat II are provided by Asoghik. The historian accuses the king of three actions: an unjust execution, the violation of his oath to the emir of Goghtn, and a prohibited marriage to his sister’s daughter. Researchers use Asoghik’s moralising account with caution. The first two cases may have been exaggerated or presented with a political subtext, while there is no independent confirmation of the third.

The king became seriously ill and died in the year 438 of the Armenian calendar, corresponding to the period between March 989 and March 990. Since Asoghik assigns thirteen years to his reign and notes that Gagik I ascended the throne in winter, the most likely date of Smbat II’s death is January or February 990. Mikayel Chamchian dated it to November 989, and the year 989 is also widespread in some encyclopaedic publications.

After Smbat’s death, a rumour spread in Ani that the king had not died but had been buried alive while in a state of unconsciousness. On the orders of Gagik I, the grave was opened and the king’s body was shown to the people and the army. This incident indicates that Smbat enjoyed considerable authority, particularly among the population and garrison of Ani.

The hypothesis of a conspiracy organised by Gagik I or the Armenian nobility has also been proposed in historiography. It is based on references in later sources to the “premature” nature of Smbat’s death and on Asoghik’s suggestion that Gagik had committed some evil act. However, no direct evidence exists, and the hypothesis remains speculative.

Unlike his father Ashot III, who was buried at Horomos, Smbat II was buried in Ani. The exact location of his grave is unknown. Some researchers associate his burial in Ani with the secure defences of the capital, while others connect it with the fact that the new and magnificent Ani was largely the result of Smbat II’s own building activity.

== Assessment and legacy ==
For a long time, Smbat II was presented in historiography primarily as a peaceful builder and the constructor of the walls of Ani. More recent studies assess his reign more broadly. The king was unable to prevent the fragmentation of the Bagratid kingdom, but he preserved the shahanshah’s supremacy over the local kings, avoided several dangerous wars, restored relations with the emir of Goghtn, and, by the end of his reign, succeeded in uniting Armenian military forces.

His most enduring legacy was the urban transformation of Ani. The Smbatashen walls, towers, gates, the defensive system of bridges, and the foundation of the cathedral transformed Ani into one of the largest urban and political centres of medieval Armenia. The programme acquired its completed form during the reign of Gagik I, but its foundations were laid under Smbat II.

== See also ==
- Smbat Walls

== Bibliography ==
- Yeghiazaryan, Arman, “Smbat II the Master of the Universe, King of Armenia”, Yerevan, Yerevan State University Press, 2021.
- Yeghiazaryan, Arman, “The Era of Smbat II the Master of the Universe: Part I”, “Vem”, 2020, no. 4.
- Yeghiazaryan, Arman, “The Problem of Succession in Bagratid Armenia and the Co-Rulership Hypothesis”, “Etchmiadzin”, 2015, no. 12.
- Adontz, Nicholas, “Works”, vols. I and V, Yerevan, 2006 and 2012.
- Arakelyan, Babken, et al., “History of the Armenian People”, vol. III, Yerevan, 1976.
- Alishan, Ghevont, “Shirak”, Venice, 1881.
- Alishan, Ghevont, “Ayrarat”, Venice, 1890.
- Alishan, Ghevont, “Armenian History”, vol. II, Venice, 1901.
- Grigoryan, Grigor, “The Feudal Principality of the Bagratunis of Taron in the Ninth–Tenth Centuries”, Yerevan, 1983.
- Harutyunyan, Babken, “The Date of the Foundation of the Kingdom of Syunik”, “Bulletin of Yerevan University”, 1969, no. 1.
- Harutyunyan, H., “Armenia in the Ninth–Eleventh Centuries”, Yerevan, 1959.
- Harutyunyan, Varazdat, “The City of Ani”, Yerevan, 1964.
- Hakobyan, Tadevos, “Ani the Capital”, Yerevan, 1988.
- Hasratyan, Murad, “The Architecture of Ani”, “Historical-Philological Journal”, 2011, no. 3.
- Margaryan, H., “The Title ‘Master of the Universe’ of the Bagratid Kings”, “Issues of Armenian History”, 2005, no. 6.
- Matevosyan, Karen, “Ani as Capital and Catholicosal Residence”, “Historical-Philological Journal”, 2008, no. 3.
- Matevosyan, Karen, “Ani: Ecclesiastical Life and Manuscript Heritage”, Holy Etchmiadzin, 1997.
- Matevosyan, Rafael, “The State Structure and Administrative System of Bagratid Armenia”, Yerevan, 1990.
- Mnatsakanian, Stepan, “Masters of Masters: Manuel, Trdat, Momik”, Yerevan, 1982.
- Movsesyan, Ghevont, “History of the Kiurikian Kings of Lori”, Vienna, 1923.
- Ormanian, Malachia, “National History”, vol. I, Constantinople, 1912.
- Ter-Ghevondyan, Aram, “The Arab Emirates in Bagratid Armenia”, Yerevan, 1965.
- Toramanian, Toros, “Extracts from My Recollections of Ani”, “Ethnographic Review”, 1912, no. 2.
- Ulubabyan, Bagrat, “The Principality of Khachen in the Tenth–Sixteenth Centuries”, Yerevan, 1975.
- Hakobyan, Aleksan, “Royal and Princely Dynasties in Albania Proper and the Eastern Regions of Armenia”, Yerevan, 2020.
- Manuk-Khaloyan, A., “In the Cemetery of Their Ancestors: The Royal Burial Tombs of the Bagratuni Kings of Greater Armenia (890–1073/79)”, “Review of Armenian Studies”, 2013, vol. 35.
- Minorsky, V., “Studies in Caucasian History”, London, 1953.
- Marr, N., “Ani: The Written History of the City and Excavations at the Site of the Settlement”, Leningrad–Moscow, 1934.
- Toumanoff, C., “The Bagratids of Iberia from the Eighth to the Eleventh Century”, “Le Muséon”, 1961, vol. 74.
- Yuzbashyan, K., “The Armenian States of the Bagratid Era and Byzantium, Ninth–Eleventh Centuries”, Moscow, 1988.

Preceded by Ashot III	King of Armenia (Bagratid Kingdom of Armenia); 977–989	Succeeded by Gagik I
