= David I Anhoghin =

David I Դավիթ Ա

King of Lori
- Reign: 989–1046/1048
- Predecessor: Kiurike I
- Successor: Kiurike II
- Co-ruler: Smbat I
- Died: 1046/1048
- Spouse: Zorakerstel
- Issue: Kiurike II; Gagik of Kakheti; Smbat II; Adarnaze
- Dynasty: Kiurikian
- Father: Kiurike I
- Religion: Christianity

David I Anhoghin also known as David the Landless (Դավիթ Անհողին in Armenian) was the King of Lori (989/990–1048/1050), son and successor of Kiurike I, grandson of King Ashot III of Armenia, and nephew of Gagik I Bagratuni.

== Biography ==
In succeeding his father Gurgen, David shared the throne with his younger brother Smbat, whose role in the governance of the kingdom was rather modest and thus largely overlooked by primary sources. Unlike his brother, David inherited his father's throne at a young age; however, this did not prevent him from understanding the challenges facing his kingdom and successfully resolving them.

David was married to Zorakrtsel, the daughter of David (976–1010), the last chorepiscopus of Kakheti. She was also the sister of Kvirike III the Great (1010–1038), the first king of the Kingdom of Kakheti-Hereti.

He built the Lori Fortress along with twelve other strongholds, whose costly construction works indicate that the Kingdom of Tashir-Dzoraget was experiencing an economic rise during that period.Following the death of King Hovhannes-Smbat of Ani (1022–1041), he proclaimed himself King of all Armenia and, in 1042, launched a campaign against Ani, but faced resistance from Vahram Pahlavuni. Later, when Gagik II (1042–1045) was detained in Constantinople, a faction of Ani's residents decided to surrender the city to David, considering that David’s sister was Gagik’s wife; however, this plan was never realized. He passed away in 1050, and his remains were laid to rest next to his father in the Holy Mother of God Church in Sanahin.He had four sons—Kyurike, Gagik, Atrnerseh, and Smbat—and one daughter, Hranush.He was succeeded by King Gurgen II (1050–1089).

== The Creation of the Kyurikian or Tashir Dzoraget Kingdom ==
The Kiurikian Kingdom, also known as the Kingdom of Tashir-Dzoraget, was one of the vassal kingdoms of Bagratid Armenia, formed in the second half of the 10th century and enduring until the early 12th century. It mainly comprised the cantons of Tashir and Dzoraget in the province of Gugark. The political and spiritual centers of the kingdom were the fortress-city of Lori, as well as the monastic complexes of Sanahin and Haghpat. The formation of the kingdom was linked to the Bagratid system of governance. Unlike the kingdoms of Vaspurakan and Syunik, which were established on the hereditary domains of local princely families, Tashir-Dzoraget—prior to the establishment of Kiurikian rule—was part of the Bagratid royal domains and directly subordinate to the King of Armenia.

The exact year of the kingdom's foundation remains a subject of debate in historiography. Various scholars consider the establishment date to be 979, 980, or 982. However, a number of studies, relying on primary sources and data regarding the founding of the Sanahin Monastery, trace the origins of Kiurikian rule back to the year 966.At that time, King Ashot III the Merciful assigned the governance of Gugark to his sons, Smbat and Gurgen (Kiurike), who acted as co-rulers.

In 977, following Smbat II's accession to the Armenian throne, the governance of Gugark passed entirely to Gurgen. According to a number of historians, in 979 Smbat II reconfirmed Gurgen's rights at Sanahin Monastery, recognizing him as the local king of Tashir-Dzoraget. However, the Kiurikian Kingdom remained under the suzerainty of the Bagratids, and its rulers held the status of vassal kings.

The founder of the Kiurikian dynasty was Gurgen (Kiurike I), who ruled in the second half of the 10th century. Under his reign, the monasteries of Sanahin and Haghpat became the hereditary spiritual centers of the Kiurikian house. According to some sources, near the end of his life, Gurgen renounced worldly power and retired to a monastery.

Gurgen was succeeded by his son, David Anhoghin (David the Landless). According to the 12th-century work 'The Last Kings of the Bagratids', Gurgen passed the authority to David, who inherited his ancestral realm. During the reign of David Anhoghin, the territory of the Kiurikian Kingdom expanded significantly. According to the chronicle 'The Last Kings of the Bagratids', the Kiurikian domains in Gugark extended from Gag and Kharay to the very gates of Tbilisi. Around the same period, several fortresses and strongholds in the Tavush canton of Utik were also incorporated into the kingdom.

During the reign of David Anhoghin, Tashir-Dzoraget preserved its standing as a northern vassal kingdom within Bagratid Armenia. St. Astvatsatsin (Holy Mother of God) Church in Sanahin continued to serve as the diocesan seat, exercising jurisdiction over the districts and settlements of the Tashir region.

== Emirate of Tiflis ==
During the reign of David Kiurikian (David Anhoghin), the Kiurikian Realm of Tashir-Dzoraget attained the height of its power, establishing him as the most illustrious figure of the Kiurikian lineage. David I established the northern border fortress-city of Shamshulde as the royal seat of his kingdom. His objective was to neutralize the imminent threat originating from the north and west—specifically from the Arab Jafarid Emirate of Tiflis and its vassal Emirate of Dmanisi.

In the mid-990s, he conquered the Emirate of Dmanisi and annexed it to his kingdom.This expansion ended Shamshulde's isolation from the other districts via the Shamshulde–Dmanisi road and secured the western borders. Following a military confrontation with Ali ibn Jafar, the Emir of Tiflis, David Anhoghin crushed and subjugated him, eliminating the grave northern threat to his realm, particularly to Shamshulde. These strategic moves not only served his kingdom's interests but also fortified a crucial section of Bagratid Armenia's northern frontiers.

Subsequently, David set about expanding the borders of his kingdom toward Utik. During that period, the most powerful princes of the province of Utik were the lords of Gardman and Pharisos, the latter even being referred to as kings.This close proximity provided favorable conditions for David Anhoghin to direct his expansionist ambitions toward Utik, and as the Kiurikian Kingdom pushed deeper into this province—which formed part of Caucasian Albania—David’s realm was increasingly referred to as the Kingdom of Albania. At that time, the Shaddadid emirate dynasty of Kurdish origin was established in Aghvank․

== Emirate of Gandzak ==
Beginning in the 970s, the Shaddadid emirate of Kurdish origin established itself in Gandzak (Ganja). Having grown powerful under Fadl I (985–1031), this emirate attempted to halt the further rise of the Kiurikian Kingdom of Tashir-Dzoraget. Three brothers from a branch of the Shaddadids ruling in Dvin moved to Gandzak, assassinated the local emir, and seized control of the Emirate of Gandzak. One of these brothers, Fadl, upon taking the helm of the emirate, marched primarily against David Anhoghin, sensing that David's gradual advance toward Gandzak posed a direct threat to his emirate.When Patloun I attacked David, apparently on the banks of the Kura, he suffered a humiliating defeat and narrowly escaped the battlefield.Nevertheless, David was unable to fully exploit the fruits of his victory to expand the borders of his kingdom at the expense of the Armenian territories held by the Shaddadids, although the looming threat was temporarily averted. Following this, David was forced to suppress a rebellion by Demetre, the prince and marzpan of Gag, who had exhibited centrifugal tendencies. The province of G,ag with its center in the fortress of the same name, served as the link between Gugark and the province of Utik.The ruler of that province, an Armenian noble, wishing to preserve his independence, sought the patronage of the Georgian king, adopted the Georgian Chalcedonian faith, was re-baptized and received the name Demeter. But his calculation did not come true, because David Ankhoghin, not paying attention to the fact that Demeter had received the title of "mampugh" (king) from the Georgians, easily conquered his province and fortresses.Having lost David's trust, he "abandoned the faith of his native Armenians and turned his back on the helper of the Lord" and became a Chalcedonian. David expelled him from Gag and seized all his fortresses and domains, condemning him to a life of wandering.

== The campaign of Gagik I and the origin of the nickname "Anhoghin" ==
In the winter of 1001, King Gagik I of Ani marched with a large army against the Kiurikian Kingdom of Tashir-Dzoraget. He entered Tashir, besieged Shamshulde, devastated the Georgian plain, and then descended into the Aghstev region via the Gag fortress. All of this took place in just three months.David attempted twice to engage his uncle in battle; however, due to the obvious disparity in strength, he was forced to abandon this intention and appeal to the Catholicos for assistance. Through the mediation of Catholicos Sargis I, David went to Shirakavan to meet Gagik I and offered his submission. Despite his promise to love his nephew like a father, Gagik seized the Aghstev region along with the Kayan and Kaytson fortresses from him, handing them over to his eldest son, Hovhannes-Smbat.

Although some researchers have attempted to link David’s epithet "Anhoghin" ("Landless") to the loss of lands during those events of 1001, according to an inscription from Haghpat dated NKhE (996)—which is now lost and known only through R. Yerznkyants's reading—David was already called by that name prior to those events.There are no sufficient grounds to emend the date of the inscription, as it is dated as NKHE (996) twice—both at the beginning and at the end. Even if we were to replace the unit of the date in the inscription, E (Ե), with E (Է), it would yield the year 998, which is only three years prior to 1001 and does not significantly alter the overall picture. Furthermore, Father Simeon, mentioned in the inscription, served as the leader of Haghpat starting from 991. Equally important is the fact that had this inscription been carved after 1001, David—who had submitted to Gagik "like a son to a father" and had been deprived of a portion of his domains—would by no means have been referred to as an "autocratic king".

No reliable information has been preserved regarding David Anhoghin’s activities over the next two decades. Most likely, during this period he was focused on strengthening the defensive system of his kingdom, which resulted in the construction of the fortress-city of Lori and twelve other fortresses.

When the Bagratid Kingdom of Ani was partitioned between King Gagik I’s sons, Hovhannes-Smbat and Ashot IV, following Gagik's death in 1020—with the latter receiving the "outer lands" (Druc Ashkharh)—David Anhoghin became his direct subordinate.During this time, Fadl I (Padlun I) had not abandoned his expansionist plans and had begun to harass his neighbors. The forces of the Georgian-Abkhazian kingdom, the troops of Jafar, the Emir of Tiflis, and David Anhoghin's army launched a preemptive strike, invading Shirvan. Probably in 1031, on the banks of the Ekletsi River, they completely routed Fadl, sending him fleeing and capturing immense spoils of war.

== Relations with Georgia ==
In 1037, following the murder of Kvirike III (Kyurike III), who left no male heir, the throne of Kakheti-Hereti passed to his nephew Gagik, the son of David Anhoghin. Thereafter, the younger branch of the Kiurikians ruled in Kakheti-Hereti, naturally bringing the realm under the political sphere of influence of the Kiurikian Kingdom of Tashir-Dzoraget. Bagrat IV (1027–1072), King of the Georgians and Abkhazians, viewed this development with hostility, deepening the tensions between the Georgian Bagratids and the Kiurikians.When the new Shaddadid Emir, Abu al-Aswar ibn Fadl, invaded the Kiurikian Kingdom of Tashir-Dzoraget from the direction of Gandzak with a massive army in 1040 and captured most of its territory within a year, Bagrat IV was in no hurry to help David Anhoghin. The extreme disparity of forces compelled the latter to forego giving battle and appeal for assistance to Hovhannes-Smbat, who until then had been passively watching the devastation.

In order to secure assistance from Hovhannes-Smbat, David threatened that he would otherwise submit to Abu al-Aswar and launch a joint attack on Shirak with him. Convinced that David Anhoghin—who had nothing left to lose—would carry out his threat, Hovhannes-Smbat not only provided him with auxiliary troops but also urged King Smbat II of Syunik to do the same, leading both to send forces to Lori. Driven by the exact same political calculus, Georgian troops dispatched by Bagrat IV also joined David. The King of Lori was further aided by Catholicos Hovsep of Aghvank. Consequently, the entire clergy of the Armenian Church of Aghvank and a multi-thousand-strong popular militia arrived at David Anhoghin's military camp.

The battle ended in the defeat of Abu al-Aswar's numerically superior army, which had been overconfident in its strength. Not only did it retreat with heavy losses, but it was also pursued for five consecutive days by the emboldened opponent, suffering numerous additional casualties. Within three days, David Anhoghin reconquered all his territories that had fallen into the Emir's hands, and he distributed the immense spoils captured from the enemy among those who had come to his aid.

== Recent years ==
In 1041, following the death of Hovhannes-Smbat, the throne of the Bagratid Kingdom of Ani fell vacant. David marched his army into the territory of the Bagratid Kingdom of Ani. Through a policy driven by his narrow personal self-interest, David Anhoghin "brought the Christian nation into the pit of suffering", earning the new, derogatory moniker Davih (the Deceitful). After the destruction of the Bagratuni Kingdom of Ani by Byzantium in 1045, both the Kyurikyans of Syunik and Kars-Vanand, as well as Tashir-Dzoraget, found themselves in an independent status. However, the Tashir-Dzoraget Kingdom was gradually threatened by a new threat, in the form of the Virabkhazian Kingdom, which had taken the path of power during the reign of Bagrat IV. Based on this, David Anhoghin tried to hinder Bagrat IV's important efforts to unify, since the independence of the Kakhet-Heret Kingdom belonging to his son Gagik was at stake. This explains David Anhoghin's open support for Bagrat IV's most powerful centrifugal opponent, Prince Liparit Bagvash of Treghq. In the summer of 1047, at a place called Sisaret, Liparit, whose assembled army included the troops of David Anhoghini and Gagik, the prince of Kakheti, defeated the army of Bagrat IV.

David I Anhoghin Kingdom of Tashir-Dzoraget Born: ? Died: 1046/1048
Preceded by Kiurike I	King of Lori; 989–1046/1048 with Smbat I	Succeeded by Kiurike II; Smbat II
