= Smbat I of Lori =

Smbat I Սմբատ Ա
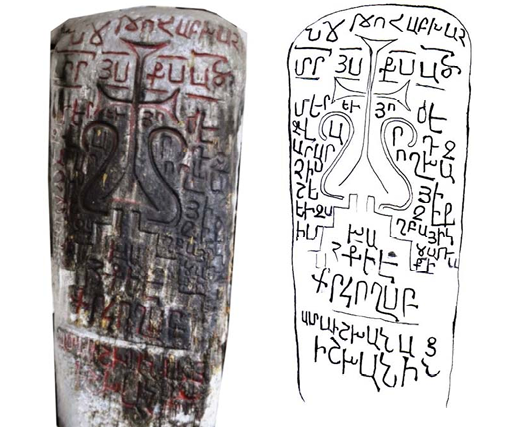
- The inscribed khachkar from Tetritskaro mentions Smbat I and refers to him as "prince of princes"

King of Lori
- Reign: 989–?
- Predecessor: Kiurike I
- Successor: David I Anhoghin as sole king
- Co-ruler: David I
- Died: 1051-1061
- House: Kiurikian
- Father: Kiurike I
- Religion: Christianity

Smbat I (in armenian, Սմբատ Ա) was the King of Lori alongside his brother David I Anhoghin(989/990–?). He was the son and successor of Kiurike I, grandson of King Ashot III of Armenia, and nephew of Gagik I Bagratuni.

== Biography ==
In succeeding their father Kiurike I, David and Smbat shared the throne. However, Smbat's role in the governance of the kingdom was rather modest and thus largely overlooked by primary sources who sometimes forget to count his co-reign. It seems that despite being older than David, David was more capable than Smbat in managing the kingdom and became one of the greatest kings of Lori.

After this nothing much is known about Smbat, according to an article, he died between 1051 and 1601.

== Khachkar inscription from Tetriskaro ==
Inside the Armenian medieval church in the Georgian town of Tetritskaro there a lapidary inscription on the khachkar which consists of 13 lines. It was created by master Vard in 1051 in memory of himself and his brother Aghbayrik, who was a priest.

At the end of the inscription, Smbat is mentionned as prince of princes of the Tashir-Dzoraget kingdom as well as ruling alongside his brother David.

It is assumed that the khachkar was moved from the Samshvilde fortress, whose ruins are located 5 km southeast of Tetritskaro town. Shamshvilde was the early capital of the Armenian kingdom of Tashir-Dzoraget.

Smbat I of Lori Kingdom of Tashir-Dzoraget Born: ? Died: ?
Preceded by Kiurike I	King of Lori; 989–?	Succeeded by David I Anhoghin
