= Ashot III of Armenia =

King of Armenia from 952/53–77

Ashot III Bagratuni Աշոտ Գ Ողորմած
- Shahanshah; King of Armenia; King of Ani
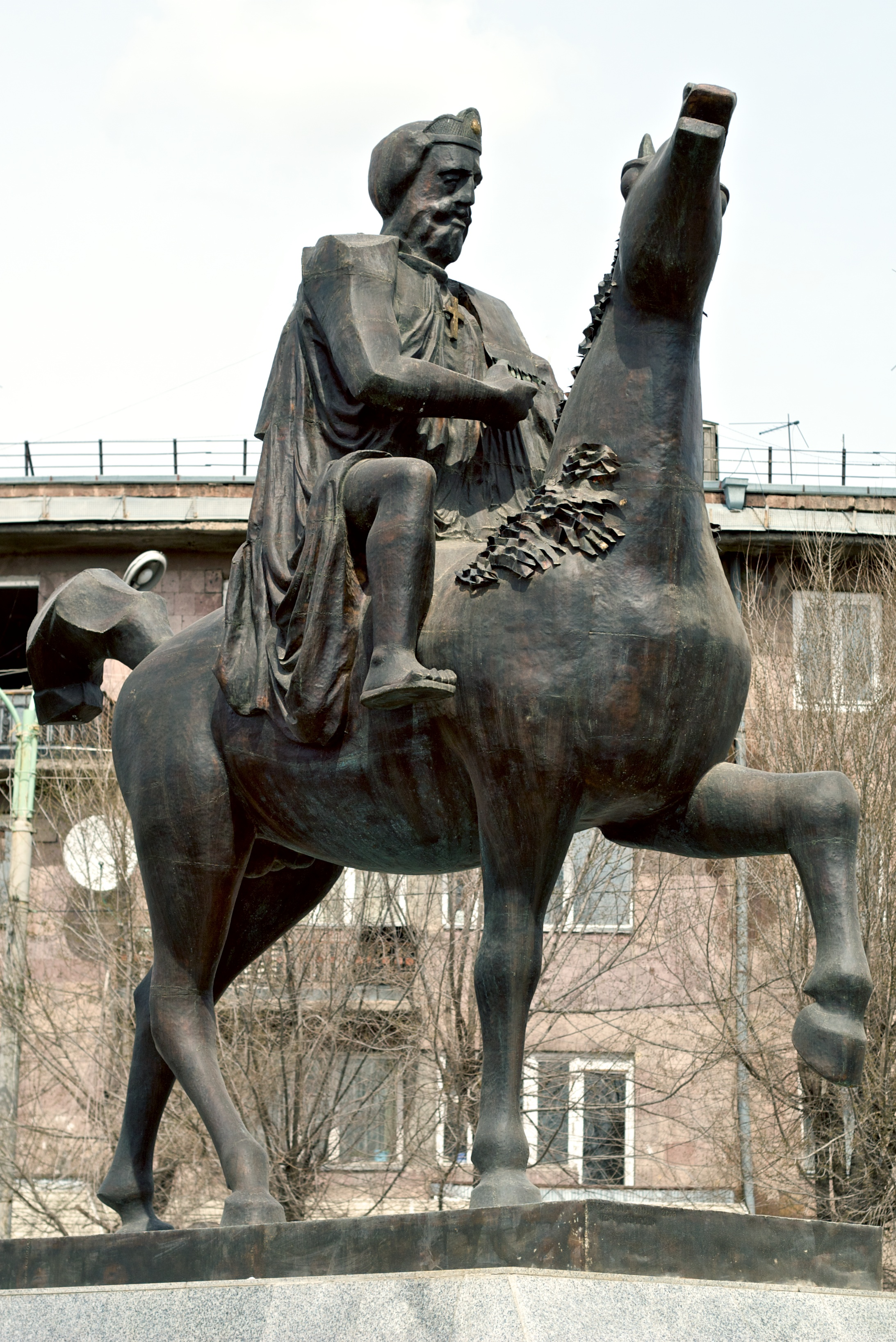
- A statue of Ashot III in Gyumri.

King of Armenia
- Reign: 953–77
- Predecessor: Abas I
- Successor: Smbat II
- Died: January 3/May 20, 977
- Burial: Ani/Horomos
- Spouse: Khosrovanuysh
- Issue: Smbat II; Gagik I Kiurike I Hripsime
- Dynasty: Bagratuni
- Father: Abas I
- Religion: Armenian Apostolic

Ashot III (Armenian: Աշոտ Գ, romanized: Ashot G) was a king of Armenia, ruling the medieval kingdom of Bagratid Armenia from 952/53–77. Known as Ashot III the Merciful (Աշոտ Գ Ողորմած) and acknowledged by foreign rulers as the Shahanshah (king of kings) of Mets Hayk' (Greater Armenia), he moved his royal seat of residence to Ani and oversaw its development and of the kingdom as a whole. Armenia reached the height of its golden era during his reign and that of his sons and successors, Smbat II (977–89) and Gagik I (990–1020).

== Biography ==
King Abas (929–953) was succeeded by his son, Ashot III the Merciful (953–978), who enjoyed great authority both in Armenia and in neighboring countries. Ashot was the eldest among King Abas's sons. He had two brothers, Atrnerseh and Mushegh; the latter later ruled in Kars. During the reign of Ashot the Merciful, Armenia experienced an economic and cultural resurgence, and a relatively peaceful situation prevailed in the country. Under his rule, old cities expanded, and new ones were built. In 966, his wife, Queen Khosrovanuysh, founded the Sanahin Monastery, and in 976, the Haghpat Monastery, both of which quickly became scientific and educational centers. Ashot III opened schools, hospitals, and almshouses in the country's major cities, allocating certain revenues for their maintenance—an exceptional phenomenon for that time. Ashot III was a benefactor, which is why he was called "the Merciful" (Voghormats).

== Explanation of the title "Merciful" ==
King Ashot III is known in historiography as "the Merciful" (Voghormats). He appears under this epithet in the works of 12th- and 13th-century historians. For example, Mkhitar of Ani calls him as such ("Ashot the Merciful, son of Abas"), Kirakos Gandzaketsi refers to him similarly ("...by order of King Ashot, who was called the Merciful"), as does Vardan Vardapet ("Ashot..., called the Merciful").Meanwhile, his contemporary, Catholicos and author Anania Mokatsi (Catholicos of Armenia: 941–966), as well as Asoghik—an author who lived and wrote shortly after his reign in the second half of the 10th and early 11th centuries—do not refer to him as "the Merciful." Anania Mokatsi, who had personal contact with Ashot III, mentions him as "...the pious King Ashot of Greater Armenia..." Asoghik simply writes that "...after Abas, his son Ashot, who was also called Shahanshah, reigned." Subsequently, in his eulogy, the author attributes "mercifulness" and "charity" to him.

The first uses of the epithet "the Merciful" (Voghormats) appear after the death of Ashot III. Specifically, an edict by Smbat II (978–990) dated to 979 states: "...I, Smbat Bagratuni, King of Armenia, grandson of the Universal and Great King Smbat, son of King Ashot, called the Merciful..." Ashot III's other son, Gurgen-Kyurike, is referred to as "...King Gurgen, son of Shahanshah Ashot the Merciful," while his tombstone (Sanahin, 989) reads: "This is the resting place of Gurgen Bagratuni, Shahanshah, son of Ashot the Merciful.".

An interesting story regarding Ashot III's epithet "the Merciful" (Voghormats) has been preserved in the folk memory over the centuries. According to a tradition kept among the elders of the city of Akhaltsikhe, Ashot resided in Kars, and people of various nationalities lived within his kingdom ("Among his subjects, you could find all kinds of nations"). Once, the people sent word to him through an overseer about their dire situation. Ashot III gave the overseer 500 gold coins to distribute to the people, but suspecting that greed would lead him to embezzle the poor people's share, he gave him an additional 100 gold coins on the condition that the full 500 gold coins would be distributed to the populace.However, the deceitful overseer falsely conveyed to the people that the king was angry and had ordered to tell them that even if they died of starvation, it was not his concern, and he kept the people's portion for himself. When Ashot III learned about this, he punished him, reclaimed the gold coins, and distributed them to the people. After that, he was called Ashot the Merciful.

== Reign ==
=== Beginning of the reign of Ashot III ===
During the reign of Abas Bagratuni, Ashot III held the office of the Prince of Princes (Ishkhanats Ishkhan) of Armenia. According to Anania Mokatsi, following the death of Abas, "...the throne of the kingdom was succeeded by his son, Lord Ashot, Prince of Princes of Armenia." During the reigns of the first four Bagratuni kings—Ashot I (887–891), Smbat I (891–914), Ashot II (914–929), and Abas (929–953)—this office was mostly held by members of the royal house who were next in line to inherit the Armenian throne .Ascending the throne in 953, Ashot III ruled for 25 years. According to Asoghik, "And after Abas, his son Ashot reigned—who was also called Shahanshah—for 25 years. And his brother Mushegh reigned in Kars alongside him".

During Ashot III’s reign, the Georgian Bagratids, who were related by marriage to the Armenian Bagratunis, recognized his suzerainty; thus, Ashot III maintained the title "Shahanshah of Armenians and Georgians". Ashot III's supremacy was also recognized by the rulers of local Armenian state entities—such as the kingdoms of Vaspurakan and Kars, as well as Khachen, Parisos, and Shirvan—who viewed the Bagratuni Kingdom as a unifying, viable, and powerful force. Ashot III sought to strengthen this confederation as much as possible, recognizing their rights and providing military assistance when necessary.

An Arab source helps clarify the situation during the first years of Ashot III Bagratuni’s reign. According to this source, around 953, "over the province of Georgia and other parts of Armenia, there was a king named Ashut ibn al-Abbas (i.e., Ashot III, son of Abas) who bore the title of 'Shahanshah.' He attempted to besiege Dvin and fight against its people. He gathered an army of 30,000 men from among the Armenians, Lezgins, and other non-believers, and encamped near a place close to it (Dvin) called Nauard.He dispersed his troops to burn the crops and destroy the settlements." However, Ashot III's forces suffered a defeat at the gates of Dvin.Subsequently, Ashot III abandoned the idea of capturing Dvin, as a result of which the Emirate of Dvin continued to exist in the heart of Armenia.In 954, they re-established control over Dvin, turning the city into a powerful stronghold for military campaigns against the Bagratuni Kingdom.

An Arab source helps clarify the situation during the first years of Ashot III Bagratuni’s reign. According to it, around 953, "over the province of Georgia and other parts of Armenia, there was a king named Ashut ibn al-Abbas (i.e., Ashot III, son of Abas) who held the title of 'Shahanshah.' During the first year of his reign Ashot launched a military assault to free the city of Dvin from Muslim rule, an undertaking that ultimately ended in failure. Despite this setback, he took steps to centralize power in the kingdom, patronizing the Armenian Church in exchange for its support. He gathered an army of 30,000 men from among the Armenians, Lezgins, and other non-believers, and encamped near a place close to it (Dvin) called Nauard.He dispersed his troops to burn the crops and destroy the settlements." However, Ashot III's forces suffered a defeat on the approaches to Dvin. Consequently, Ashot III abandoned the idea of capturing Dvin, leaving the Emirate of Dvin to persist in the heart of Armenia . This information from the Arab source is important, as it reveals other valuable facts as well. In fact, Georgia (Virk) was under the suzerainty of Ashot III; additionally, he held a significant position among the Caucasian mountaineers, as evidenced by the participation of Lezgin troops in the operation to liberate Dvin. Furthermore, it turns out that from the very beginning of his reign, he bore the title of "Shahanshah." It is known that among the Bagratunis, Ashot Iron was the first to hold it, whereas King Abas is not mentioned with this title. However, it is impossible for Ashot III, having only newly ascended the throne, to have independently attained both the status of King of the Armenians and Georgians and the title of "Shahanshah." Therefore, the only plausible conclusion is that he inherited it from his father, King Abas, who, although not explicitly mentioned with this title, actually bore it.

It is very important that in a manuscript used in the latest edition of Samvel Anetsi's work, the following line is present: "НЕ (408). Ashot defeated Hamtun, which was suppressed by the governor...", which indicates that the army of the Hamdanian (Hamtun) amir was defeated by the army of the Armenian kingdom. By the way, this is probably about Sayf al-Dawla Hamdanian, who ruled, among other territories, Agdznik (Diyar Bakr), from where the invasion probably took place. One of Sayf al-Dawla's subordinates named Naja rebelled against him and entered Armenia. Here he took possession of the territories of the Arab Kaisik tribe and the surrounding cities: Khlat, Manazkert, Mush and other places.After that, he rebelled against Sayf al-Dawla. Finally, in 353 AH (January 19, 964 - January 6, 965), Sayf al-Dawla defeated Naja and took control of his lands, including those that Naja had captured from the Qaisiks. It was during these events that the Battle of Taron took place. According to Ibn al-Azrak, after defeating Naja, Sayf al-Dawla returned from Armenia in January 966. Therefore, most likely, the battle took place against Naja's army before his defeat by Sayf al-Dawla in 964. The reason for the clash with the Armenians was also clear: he had also captured Mush, which was not part of the Qaisiks' dominions. The Armenian army defeated Naja's army and liberated Mush and the surrounding area (the province of Taron). As a result of the Naja invasion, the Emirate of Qays was destroyed, and its territories passed to Sayf al-Dawla.

==== Capital Ani ====
Under the conditions of peace established in the country, from the 30s of the 10th century, the Bagratuni kingdom became more prosperous and powerful, its influence in the political life of neighboring state formations increased. Therefore, there was a need to establish a permanent center for the state. The former residences of the Bagratunis - Bagaran, Shirakavan, Kars - did not have a unifying ability, since they were located far from the central regions of the Bagratuni kingdom.The Bagratunis did not immediately make Ani their capital. They first settled in Bagaran, then moved to Yerazgavors (Shirakavan), and only then decided to make Ani their capital. Neither Bagaran nor Yerazgavors could compete with Ani in terms of natural defenses, which provided a safe haven in case of danger.In 961 Ani was proclaimed the capital of the kingdom, and Ashot set himself to enriching and expanding the city. Ashot constructed a wall enclosing Ani and that would later take its name after him, and sponsored the building of monasteries, hospitals, schools, and almshouses. His consort, Queen Khosrovanuysh, meanwhile sponsored the construction of the churches in Sanahin and Haghpat.

By capturing Dvin, Ashot III was attempting to resolve the issue of a permanent capital, as three different centers of the kingdom (Bagaran, Yerazgavors, and Kars) had been changed during the reigns of the first four Bagratuni rulers. Having failed in this endeavor, he focused on the developing city of Ani. During this period, Ani was an important trade hub on the route entering Armenia from the southeast and continuing through Dvin toward Trebizond and Constantinople, which is why one of Dvin's gates was called "Bab Ani" (Gate of Ani).Considering the historical significance of proclaiming Ani the capital, Leo named the historical period from that point until the fall of the kingdom the "Ani Period".He considers the primary reasons for selecting Ani as the capital to be its central location within the kingdom and the Bagratuni domains, as well as its naturally impregnable position. He also posits that while each previous Bagratuni king had moved the royal residence to his own personal domain, Ashot III managed to establish a system where, even though subsequent kings had their own separate seats, they did not relocate the capital from Ani.

After becoming the capital, the growth of the city accelerated rapidly. In the years 963–964, the so-called Ashotyan walls were built. Regarding these walls, the historian Vardan writes: "Ashot the Merciful built the small walls of the city of Ani, and completed all their towers in the year 423 of the Armenian era".According to Mkhitar Anetsi, after Ani was proclaimed the capital, Ashot "built the Small City," while according to the author of the «History of the City of Ani» and Vardan Vardapet, "He built a small wall in Ani." It can be concluded that Mkhitar Anetsi's "small city" should in fact be "small wall," which, according to Vardan Vardapet, was constructed in 964–965. Several towers containing chapels were built along the length of the wall. The Ashotyan walls, being constructed across the narrow neck of the promontory, protected the road leading to the Citadel (Mijnaberd).

Around 964, Ashot III constructed a new city wall across the narrowest part of Ani, spanning from south of the citadel to slightly north of it. It is believed that a defensive line—likely an earthen rampart—existed at that site even earlier, as researchers suggest the wall built by Ashot was erected either upon or supported by an earthen embankment.Ani expanded so rapidly that just a generation later, a new and longer system of defensive walls was built further north, known as the Walls of King Smbat. Consequently, Ashot’s wall lost its original significance over time and gradually fell into ruin.

In 961, an assembly was convened in Ani, attended by all the princes of Armenia, King Ashot III, Catholicos Anania I Mokatsi (946–968), and various bishops. Also present at the assembly were princes and military leaders, alongside Catholicos Hovhannes of Caucasian Albania (Aghvank) and 40 bishops. The purpose of calling the assembly was the coronation of Ashot III. Thus, in 961, the ceremonial festival proclaiming Ani as the capital and establishing the royal seat there took place.

=== The second period of the reign of Ashot III ===
The late 960s and the first half of the 970s marked one of the most complex and pivotal phases of Ashot III the Merciful's reign. At the peak of its power, the Armenian kingdom faced a grave threat during this period, as the Byzantine emperors Nicephorus Phocas (963–969) and John Tzimiskes (969–976) emerged in the East with exceedingly ambitious expansionist plans. Byzantium's primary goal was to conquer the territories extending from Cilicia to Palestine, but along the way, it sought to leverage the military support of the Bagratuni Kingdom on the one hand, while attempting to sow internal discord within Armenia and detach further provinces from it on the other. Targeted by Byzantium's expansionist policies were Taron-Turuberan and the canton of Basen in Ayrarat, with Vaspurakan also in sight for the future. In 974, John Tzimiskes invaded Taron with his army, encamping in the vicinity of the city of Mush. However, on the very first night, the Roman troops suffered severe hardships at the hands of the infantry from the Principality of Sasun.In the war between the Byzantine emperor John Tzimiskes and the Arabs, Armenia did its best to remain neutral and forced the two battling parties to respect the boundaries of its country. The Byzantine army began to march across the plain of Mush, thinking to strike the decisive blow against the Arabs from Armenia, but when they met with the 30,000-strong army of Ashot III, they altered their plan and left Armenia. Ashot instead provided Tzimiskes with 10,000 soldiers, who accompanied his men in their campaign in Mesopotamia. Ashot III managed to temporarily halt the advance of Byzantium, which had seized Taron in 968. Consequently, the empire would await a new opportunity to realize its objectives.

==== Religious policy ====
Ashot III also paid great attention to the policies pursued by the Church. However, during this geopolitically complex period, the spiritual life of the kingdom was far from peaceful. Amid the Byzantine advance, it once again faced the threat of the spread of Chalcedonianism, which, fortunately, was successfully neutralized. In 968, Ashot III convened a church council in Shirakavan. The assembled council decided to elect Bishop Vahan of Syunik as Catholicos to succeed the deceased Anania I Mokatsi.However, due to his leanings toward the Chalcedonian Church, he was deposed at a council convened in Ani in 969 by order of Ashot III.Following these events, Armenia remained without a Catholicos for one year․ By the king's order, select dignitaries and holy bishops gathered and elevated to the patriarchal throne the blessed man of God, Khachik—a relative of the great patriarch Lord Anania—who, through his doctrinal teachings, curbed the ambitions of the heterodox. He occupied the throne for 19 years.

During the reign of Ashot III, numerous settlements across the kingdom were built up, and monasteries and churches were founded, alongside which educational centers and manuscript workshops (scriptoria) were established. The schools opened adjacent to the monasteries frequently evolved into major centers of learning.

Ashot III's spouse, Queen Khosrovanuysh, was also renowned for her architectural achievements. In 966, she commissioned the construction of the famous Sanahin Monastery, and in 976, under her patronage, Haghpatavank—proclaimed the "capital of monasteries"—was erected. Construction efforts expanded further in subsequent years. In 972, with the assistance of Ashot III, the architect Trdat built the Mother Church and the Catholicosate in the patriarchal seat of Argina.

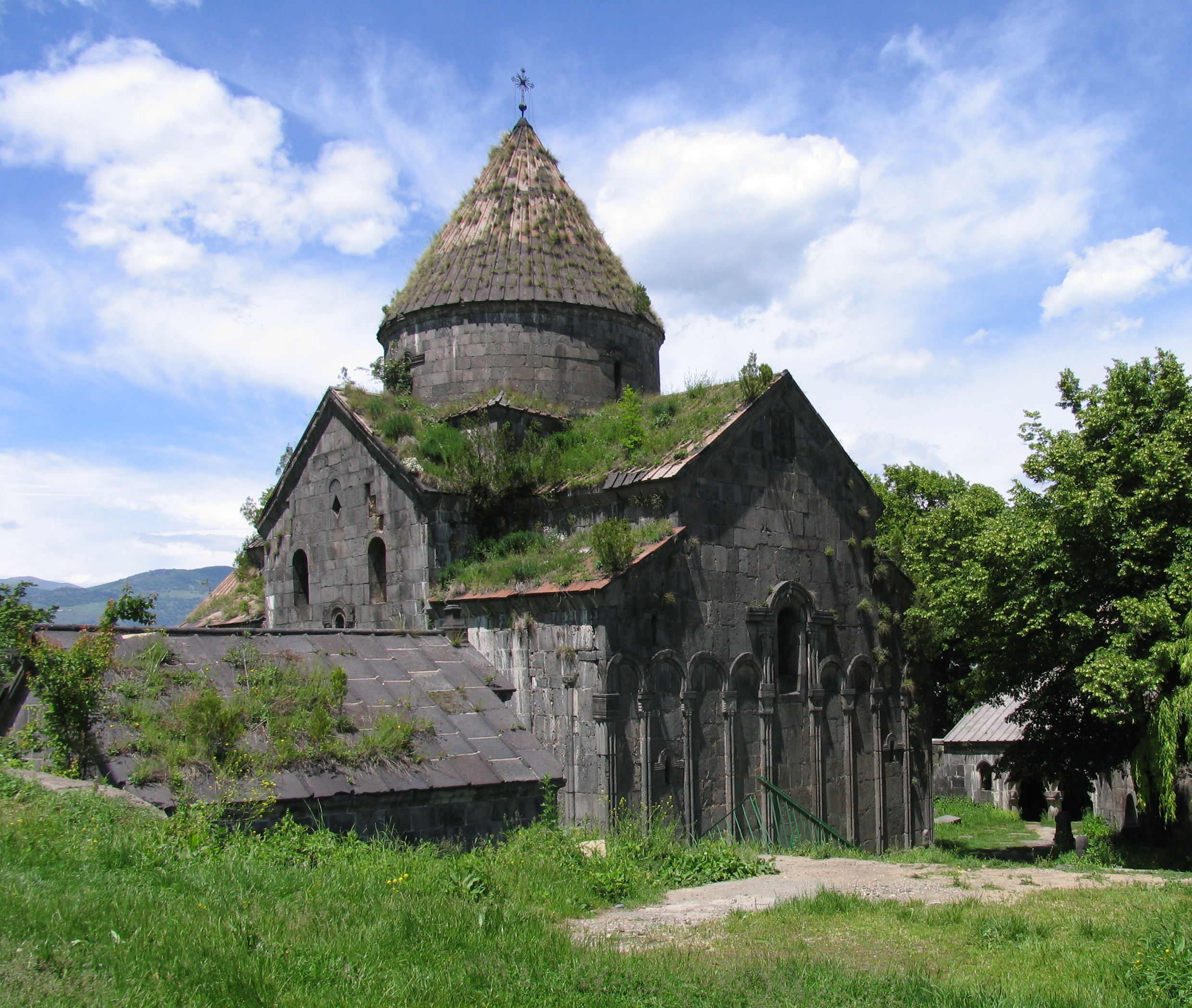
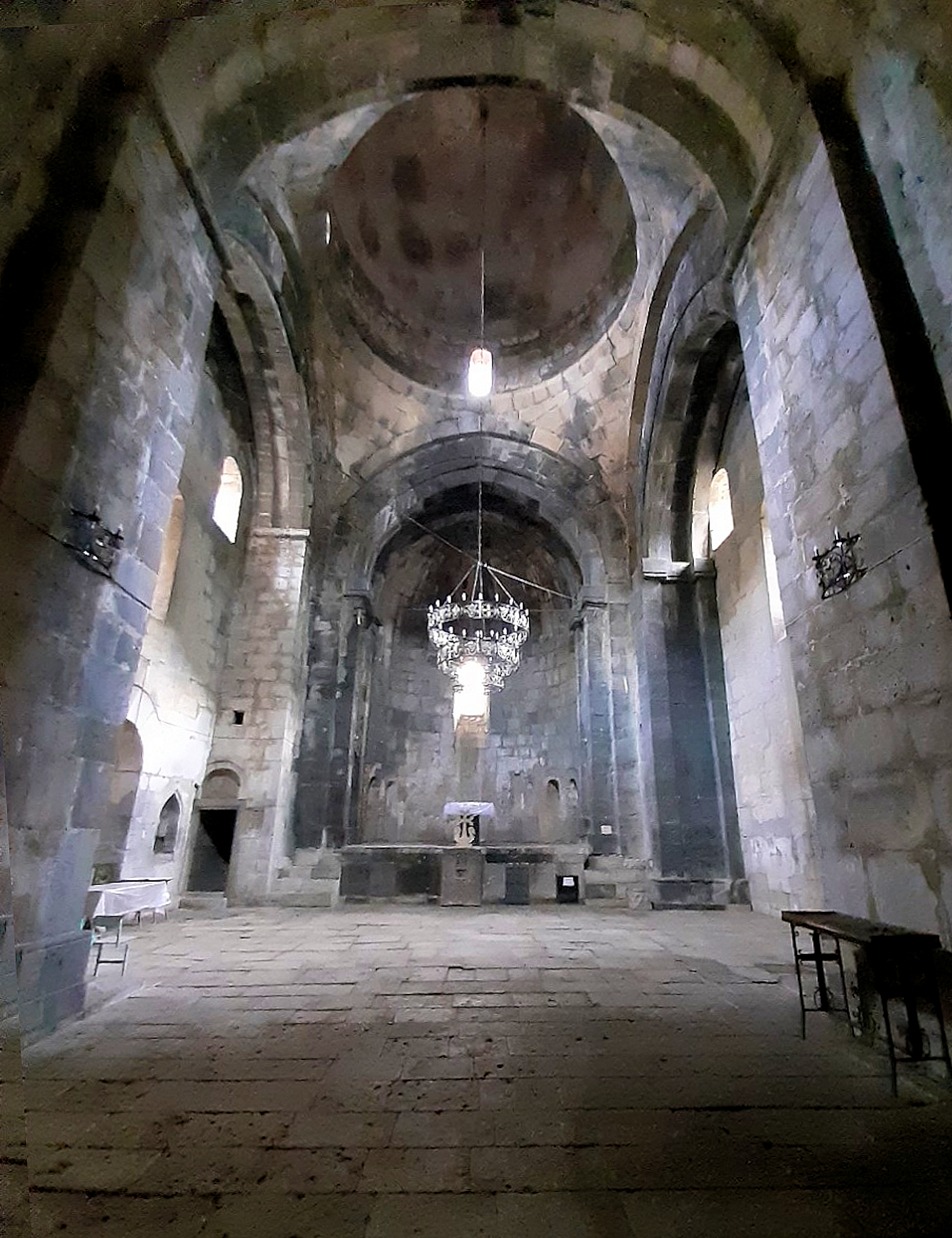
St. Amenaprkich (Holy Savior) Church in Sanahin Monastery was built by Queen Khosrovanush, wife of king Ashot III, in 966

==== Sub-kingdoms ====
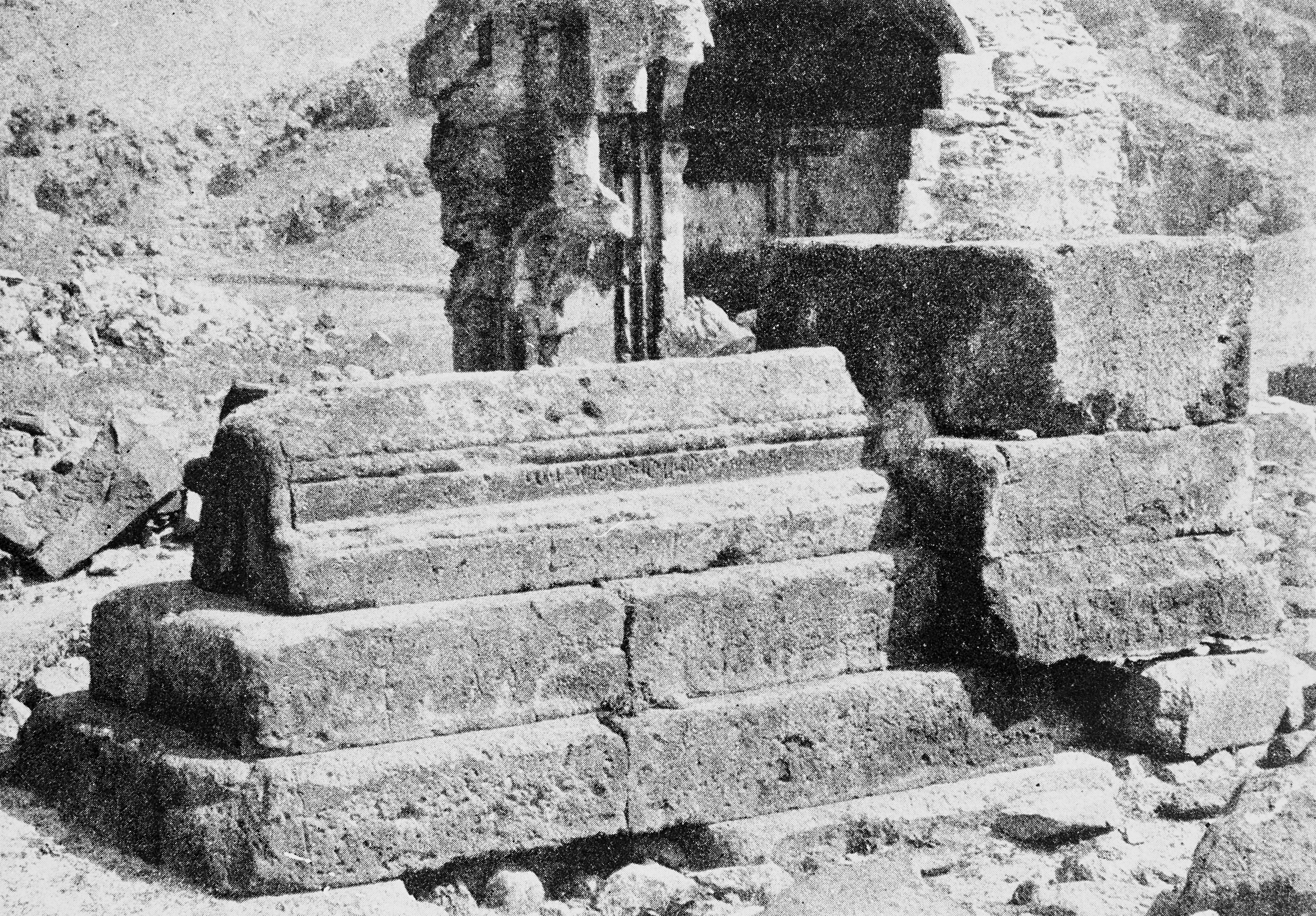
Tomb of King Ashot, Horomos Monastery.

A new phenomenon that began under Ashot III's reign and continued under his successors was the establishment of sub-kingdoms throughout Bagratuni Armenia. Ashot III had sent his brother Mushegh I to rule in Kars (Vanand) and had allowed him to use the title of king. The administrative district of Dzoraget near Lake Sevan was given to Ashot's son Gurgen, the progenitor of the Kyurikid line, in 966, who would later assume the title of king. The proliferation of so many kingdoms worked to the benefit of Armenia so long as the king in Ani remained strong and maintained his hegemony over other kings. Otherwise, the kings, as well their respective bishops who would claim the position of catholicos and formulate their own doctrines, would begin to test the limits of their autonomy.

== Death ==
The information provided by the historian Asoghik is of great importance for clarifying the dates of King Ashot III the Merciful's ascension to the throne and his death. He attributes a 25-year reign to Ashot III, starting from the year 402 of the Armenian era (April 953 – April 954), and dates his death to the year 426 of the Armenian era (March 977 – March 978). Based on these data, it is currently accepted in historiography that Ashot III reigned from 953 to 977. However, the interval between 953 and 977 does not amount to 25 years. In fact, the period between the Armenian years 402 (April 953 – April 954) and 426 (March 977 – March 978) counts as 25 years if his reign is dated from 953 to 978. The accuracy of such dating is demonstrated by valuable information preserved in the Synaxarion (Yaysmavourk), which notes that the memory (death) day of Ashot III was commemorated on the 13th of the month of Mareri. Since Asoghik was a contemporary of Ashot III, the probability that he made an error regarding the year of the king's death is extremely low. Therefore, the 13th of Mareri in the Armenian year 426 should be considered the exact day of the king's death, which corresponds to January 3, 978. On this basis, we can record that he reigned for 25 years, from 953 to 978. Scholars have suggested that he was buried either in Ani or at the nearby Horomos monastic complex. which served as the royal sepulcher during his reign. Near the St. Gevorg Church of the monastery, his tombstone—bearing the inscription "...King Ashot..."—was preserved until the beginning of the 20th century.

Preceded by Abas I	King of Armenia (Bagratid Kingdom of Armenia); 953–977	Succeeded by Smbat II
