= Khosrovanuysh =

- Born: Unknown
- Died: 977
- Spouse: Ashot III
- Issue: Smbat II; Gagik I Kiurike I Hripsime
- Dynasty: Bagratuni

Khosrovanuysh (Armenian: Խոսրովանույշ) was a fifth queen of Bagratid Armenia, and wife of Armenian king Ashot III.

== Biography ==
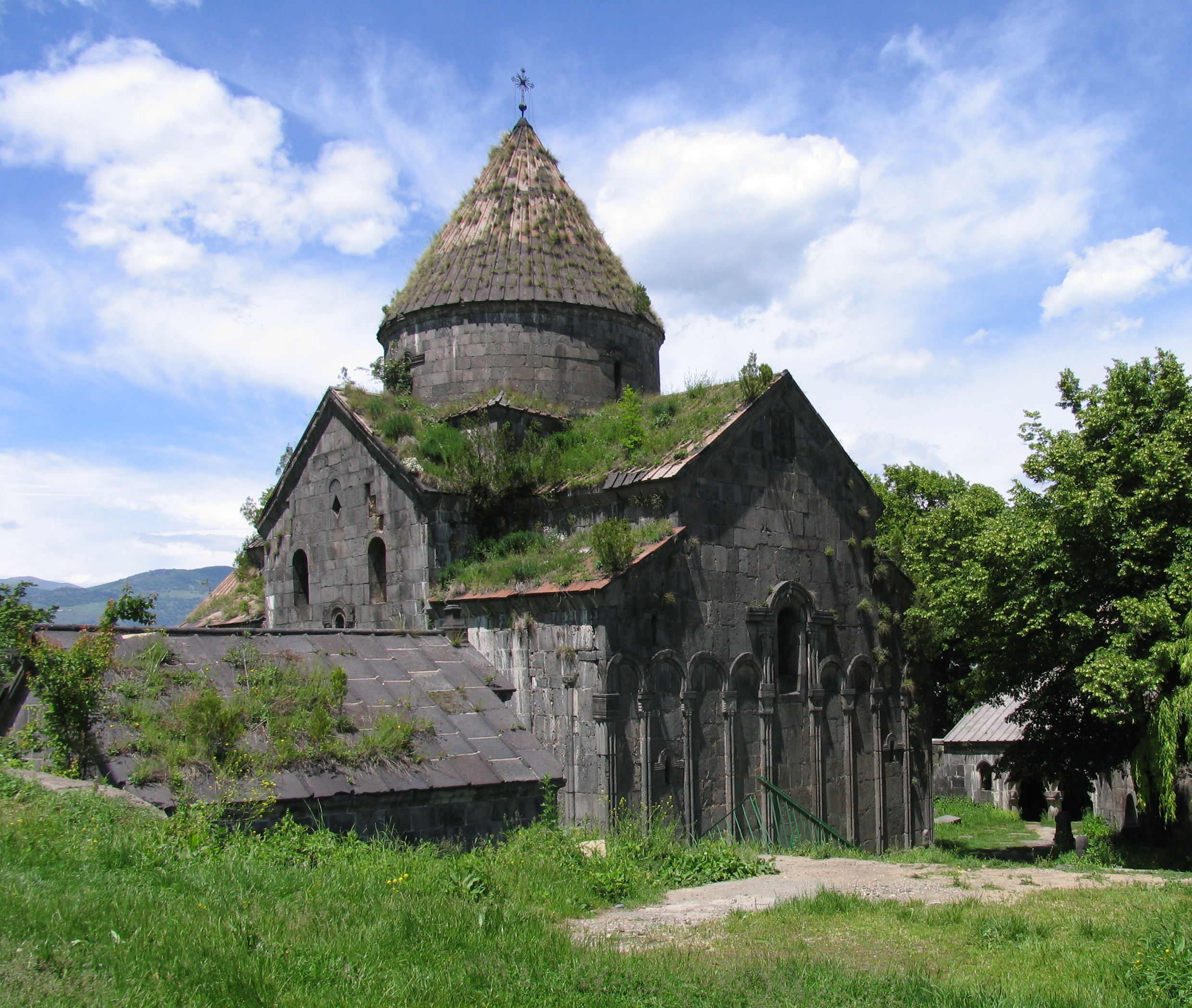
The Sanahin Monastery.

Queen Khosrovanuysh was a great philanthropist in medieval Armenia. There is little information about the queen's ancestors and lineage, and it is also unknown when she was born. However, the names of her children and grandchildren have been preserved. She had three sons, Smbat, Gagik and Gurgen, and one daughter, Hripsime. Smbat inherited his father's throne and became the king of Armenia in 977. In 990, he was succeeded by his brother Gagik, who reigned until 1020. Gurgen founded a separate royal branch in Lori (Kiurikian) and became the first monarch of the Kingdom of Tashir-Dzoraget. It is known that Hripsime became a nun.

Khosrovanuysh, with the help of her husband, began the construction of the Church of the Savior in 966. She dedicated it to her sons Smbat and Gurgen, which can be seen on a bas relief of the tympanum. In the same year, Khosrovanuysh built the Sanahin Monastery, and then, in 976, the Haghpatavank. These became scientific and educational centers in the Middle Ages. A university and a library were opened in Sanahin. The Cathedral of Surb Nshan (Holy sign) was also built around 967-976 by the queen.
