= Mkhitar of Ani =

Armenian historian and Christian priest

Mkhitar of Ani (Armenian: Մխիթար Անեցի; Mkhitar Anets'i, Mxit'ar of Ani) was an Armenian historian and priest of the second half of the 12th to the beginning of the 13th century. He studied at the monastery of Horomos, near Ani.

Demonstrating a strong enthusiasm for astronomy, Mkhitar translated a Persian text on the zodiac and eclipses and accompanied it with illustrative diagrams. No copy of the work, however, exists today.

== Universal history ==
Mkhitar is the author of Universal History, of which only the introduction survives. His work was patronized by Grigor, abbot of Harich. Like Samuel Anetsi, Mkhitar begins his work with a succinct summary of the patriarchs from the Old Testament.

A missing segment of Mekhitar's "Universal History" was found in a copy of Vardan Areveltsi's Historical Compilation. The segment consisted of information on the Ghaznavids and Seljuqs. From the fragments of Mkhitar's work it is clear he used Aristakes Lastivertsi, Hovhannes Imastaser, and Samuel Anetsi, while the information on the Seljuqs was translated from Persian.

== Sources ==
- Kouymjian, Dickran K. (1969). "Mxit'ar of Ani on the Rise of the Seljuqs'". Revue des Études Arméniennes. VI: 331–353.
- Kouymjian, Dickran K. (1973). "Problems of Medieval Armenian and Muslim Historiography: The Mxit'ar of Ani Fragment". International Journal of Middle East Studies. 4 (4): 465–475. doi:10.1017/S0020743800031123. JSTOR 162315.
- Thomson, Robert W. (1980). "Armenian Variations on the Baḥira Legend". Harvard Ukrainian Studies. 3/4, Part 2. Eucharisterion: Essays presented to Omeljan Pritsak on his Sixtieth Birthday by his Colleagues and Students: 884–895. JSTOR 41035880.
- Thomson, Robert W. (2011). "Medieval Chroniclers of Ani: Hovhannes, Samvel, and Mkhitar". In Hovannisian, Richard G. (ed.). Armenian Kars and Ani. Costa Mesa. pp. 65–80. ISBN 9781568591575.
