= Gavit (surname) =

Gavit is a Hindic surname that may refer to

- Vijaykumar Gavit, Indian politician
- Heena Gavit, Indian politician
- Rajendra Gavit, Indian politician
- Nirmala Gavit, Indian politician
- Manjula Gavit, Indian politician
- Manikrao Gavit, Indian politician

== See also ==
- court case
