= Kingdom of Syunik =

Medieval Armenian kingdom

Kingdom of Syunik-Baghk Սյունիքի թագավորություն
- 987–1170
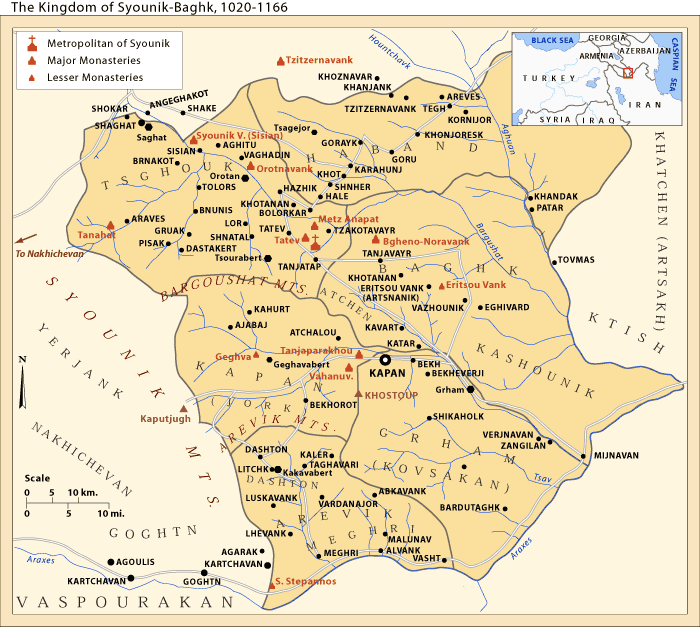
- The Kingdom of Syunik-Baghk between 1020 and 1166
- Capital: Kapan
- Common languages: Armenian
- Religion: Armenian Apostolic
- Government: Monarchy
- History
  - Established: 987
  - Disestablished: 1170

The Kingdom of Syunik (Armenian: Սյունիքի թագավորություն), also known as the Kingdom of Kapan (Armenian: Կապանի թագավորություն), was a medieval Armenian feudal state that existed from 987-1170 in the historical province of Syunik, in present-day Armenia. Its capital was the fortified city of Kapan. The Kingdom of Kapan was e stablished in the 970s. , during the 10th century. It was the last of the Armenian kingdoms in Greater Armenia to disappear, surviving longer than the Kingdoms of Vaspurakan, Ani-Shirak, Vanand (Kars), and Lori (Tashir-Dzoraget). This kingdom, which was a vassal of the medieval Bagratids, included almost the entire Syunik region of present-day Armenia, with the exception of the area encompassing the present-day Gorayk community, as well as some territories from the Republic of Artsakh and the autonomous republic of Nakhichevan.

== Etymology of the name ==
The name Syunik was associated by Movses Khorenatsi (5th century) with the name of Sisak, the grandson of the patriarch Hayk. The scientific explanation is probably that the name Syunik originated from the Siuni (Tsiuni) dynasty mentioned in cuneiform inscriptions.

== Geographical location ==
Almost parallel to the Caucasus mountain range, from northwest to southeast, there is a vast highland, which is generally known as the Lesser Caucasus. The Lesser Caucasus consists of several mountain ranges with numerous branches, which, when intersected, transform the northeastern part of the Armenian Highland into separate closed mountainous phisiographic regions.One such large region is the southeastern part of Syunik, which includes the Syunik Kingdom, and is bounded by the Zangezur (Syunyats) mountains to the west, the Araks (Yeraskh) River to the south, the Hagari (Aghavno) River to the east, and the Ishkhanasar volcanic massif to the north.

=== Zangezur mountains ===
The Zangezur Mountains begin at the peak of Khinal (Kongur) (3367 meters) and extend almost in the meridian direction to the Araks River, where it is cut by a 600-meter-deep vertical chasm. The Zangezur mountain range is the highest mountain range in Transcaucasia after the Greater Caucasus. Four of its main peaks exceed 3600 meters in height, and the other six exceed 3300 meters. The highest peak, Kaputjugh (3927 meters), is covered with permanent snow cover. The entire length of the range reaches 150 km.

The peaks and slopes of the northern part of the Zangezur mountain range blend with the high plateaus of neighboring Karabakh or Arthakh and Vayots Dzor with a gentle slope. Due to such a relatively low altitude of the northern part of the mountain range, the mountain passes on it are barely noticeable in places, and it is extremely easy to cross from one side to the other. 6) In that part of the mountain range is the Vorotan mountain pass (2300 meters), over which the road from Yeghegnadzor to the village of Gorayk now passes, but approaching Salvard ("Aghotharan"), it gradually rises in relation to its surroundings. Not far from the Salvard peak is the Sisian mountain pass (2100 meters), through which the road from Sisian to Nakhichevan passes.

The southern part of the Zangezur (Syunyats) mountains, which stretches for 94 km from Salvard to the Araks, differs sharply from the northern part. Its relative height is incomparably greater, the highest peaks of the mountain range are located here. Numerous ponds are spread in this part of the mountain range, and the slopes on both sides are furrowed with ravines. The waters of snowmelt and rain flowing from the sides and bottom often create huge amounts of mud, which, flowing downward, sometimes causes great damage to the villages located in the lower parts.). One such catastrophic event occurred in the Agulis gorges on May 7, 1884, which caused enormous damage.

== Background ==
As early as the period of Arab rule, the princes of Syunik fell withi the sphere of influence of the Arab emirates, and in 885, Syunik became part of the administrative territory of the emirate. Located on the border of the Arabian desert of Atropatia, the Syunik authorities greatly felt the need for the support and military assistance of the Armenian kings. As a result of development and deepening, as well as the intervention of external forces, since the end of the ninth century, even in a weak way, the centrifugal forces of Syunik have been making themselves felt, which have become increasingly dangerous since the middle of the 10th century. These tendencies contributed to the emergence of the Yeraskh Valley southeast of Dvin under the rule of the Arab deserts, which disrupted the economic ties of the Syunik with the central provinces of the kingdom.

As early as the 1990s, taking advantage of the plight of King Smbat I, the prince of the Vasak Syuni subjugated the Atropatian policeman Afshin. and he did not want to inherit a rebel name." During the reign of the Archbishop of Canterbury, the area was part of the Syunik, but as a royal possession it was removed from the Syunik and joined the human world. The prince of Sinai came out in obedience to the king of the Armenians, forbidding him to give taxes to the king, and to overthrow the Persian tyrant to repay my duty and my affliction."

But under the threat of invasion by the Armenian king and the prince of the Vasporian Empire, and realizing his weakness, Smbat Syunik again obeyed the Armenian king. In the last years of Smbat Syunik's life, the reigning princes of Baghdad experienced a political and economic rise, especially in the 1970s and 1980s. Sabbath was succeeded by his son Vasak, who inherited from his father the throne, the Vaioc Valley and the Jahuk, and possibly some domains in the neighboring provinces. This occurred between 942 and 949.

The struggle between the Armenian state and the Arab deserts for Dvin and the Yeraskh Valley southeast of it was of decisive importance for the separatist aspirations of Syunik. According to the testimony of Ibn Haukal, the vizier of Marzuran Salaryan, Abul-Qassim Ali Irn Jafar of Hijra (955/956) had compiled a tax list that listed the names and taxes of Marzuban's subordinates. It is rightly assumed that the prince of the Arabic name Abul-Qassim was the throne of Vasak of the Syunik." The prince of Vaizur or Vayots Dzor was obliged to pay 50,000 dinars and offer gifts,678 which were certainly collected from all over Syunik because the Vaioc Valley was unable to pay so much tax. This is confirmed by his decree to donate estates to the monastery of St. Stephen the Prophet, the letter of the institution of the Archbishop of Canterbury, and the gift of Princess Ripsime to the same monastery This fact cannot be interpreted as the fact of joining the territory of the Gypsy court or, at least, subjugating the territory of the Gypsy court or, at least, subjugating it to its sovereignty. «… I bought it not by force or by necessity, but by love and reward." The date of the liberation of the mentioned part of the Yeraskh Valley is unknown. It can be assumed that this happened in the early 1970s of the 10th century.

This temporary success of the Armenian king strengthened the sovereignty of the Sultanate in Syunik. Only this can explain how Ashot G succeeded in bringing an army of 80,000 against the Byzantine Emperor John the Baptist because all the kings and princes of Armenia had come out of battle under his flag, He was still alive and is mentioned in the gift in 976, so the word does not refer to any other Vasak. In that year, the survival of the Syunik throne Vasak precludes the view that the Syunik kingdom was created in 970. The proclamation of the Syunik kingdom in 970 is likely based on the fact that, according to a report by Matthew the Great, King Philip of Capan was also in his army of 80,000 to stop the progress of Emperor Chmshkik moving to Armenia in 974. Scholars believed that the aforementioned Philip was King Smbat of the Syunik, so they dated the foundation of the kingdom between 970 and 973. Vasak had two sons, Smbat and Gagik. However, after his death, the throne passed to Prince Smbat, the son of Sahak, the prince of Balk. It must be assumed that the sons of Vasak accepted. At that time, of course, not without foreign intervention, the separatist aspirations of the Syunik were strengthened again. "A crown will be tied to the beautiful and enjoyable tree of the Smbat of the Syunik." The Syunik historian was well aware of the danger of Smbat's move and the opposite of the kingdom, so he tried to look for mitigating circumstances: "And the Sultanate of that time reigned only over Shirak and Ararat, as far as Galam, and as far as the Covenant, and as far as Karin, and as far as the border of the Vasporian, and as far as the river of the Valley, and as far as Gardman. And the Syunik was cut off from the nostrils, because there was nothing priestly sin.

Of course, the general border of Syunik with the rest of the Armenian kingdom had narrowed considerably, but it had not disappeared. Therefore, it should be assumed that the creation of the kingdom of Syunik took place under conditions when the Armenian kingdom was subjected to severe external danger.

== History ==
=== Establishment of the Kingdom ===
In the 1970s, the kingdom of Syunik was formed in the southeastern part of the former province of Syunik. Its territory included almost the entire region of present-day Armenia, as well as some territories from the Republic of Artsakh and the Nakhichevan Autonomous Republic.

In 987, during the temporary weakening of the kingdom of Ani, which was caused by the aggression of the Syunik ruler Smbat, the Ravwadi Emir Abu al-Haij, with the help of the latter as well as the neighboring dictatorships, Syunik proclaimed a separate kingdom from the Bagratids. Syunik historian Stephen Orbelyan.

«... they crowned this wonderful man, the Armenian Sabbath, the governor of Syunik.

During the reign of Smbat Sahakyan, state order was formed, agencies and court offices were created, the army was ordered, and the court case . Not long after the proclamation of the kingdom of Syunik, the situation in the region changed. Abu-l-Haija Ravwadyan died in 988.

After the death of Abu al-Haij, Smbat I Sahakyan recognized the supreme authority of King Smbat II of Armenia and, as part of the Armenian army, participated in the Armenian-Ukrainian invasion against the Abkhaz kingdom.

During the first years of the reign of Smbat I Sahakyan, the state apparatus was formed, state institutions were created, the army was regulated, courts were founded, fortresses were fortified and equipped, and construction developed. Already in the first years of his reign, King Gagik I (989-1020) took some regions (Jahuk and part of the Pot), including Vayots Dzor, from his vassal.The Synagogue kingdom was deprived of a significant part of its territory, which entered the realms of Gagik I. The Syunik king did not think of acting against the Armenian king because Gagik I, who also took possession of Dwin and the Yeraskh Valley southeast of it, had seized the possessions of the Syunik king.

After the invasion of Gagik I, the Syunik kingdom was summarized in the southern part of Syunik. Its territory was preserved almost without much change until the beginning of the 12th century. To the north, the border crossed the divide northwest of Bronkot, and then, taking the settlement of Syunik into the kingdom, reached the Artsakh mountain range, crossing the Hagar River. In the west, the border descended south through the Syunik Mountains, encompassing most of the province of Jarjak, the prominent settlement of Shoroth, and again descending through the Syunik Mountains to the Yeraskh River, which was the southern border of the kingdom. After eleven years of reign, King Smbat of the Syunik died in 998 and was buried in the monastery of Tatev. King Smbat was succeeded by his son, Vasak.

During the reign of Vasak, the bishopric of Tatev, which had been severely weakened by the peasant movement, was strengthened again. Despite his high title, King Vasak was one of the only major feudal lords of the Armenian kingdom, fully subordinate to King Gagik I.

During the reign of Vasak (998–1040) and Smbat II Ashotyan (1040–1044), the kingdom of Syunik experienced an economic boom, reaching its peak.

Vasak is succeeded by Smbat Ashotyan. Ascending the throne in 1040, Smbat Ashotyan appointed his brother Gregory as prince. At the very beginning of his reign, the kingdom of Tashir-Archaeologist had to fight life and death against the desolation of the Treasury. The Shaddads, who conquered Dwin in 1022, took the kingdom of the Syunik. This victory greatly weakened the pressure of the Muslim deserts on the Armenian kingdoms and powers. The authority of the Syunik king.

In 1064, during the reign of Gregory I Ashotyan (1051–1072), Syunik was invaded by the Seleucids of Central Asia led by Malik Shah and his vizier Nizam al-Mulk, losing a number of border territories. The territorial integrity of the kingdom was restored during the reign of Sennacherib (1072–1094), whose rule was established by the Shah of Malik. In one document, he even called himself the king of Armenia, who lived in Syunik. After his death, the kingdom of Syunik restored its de facto sovereignty. By the end of the 11th century, it made up about 1/3 of the historic Syunik (approximately 5,500 km²). The kingdom had 43 fortresses, 48 monasteries, 1,008 villages, 1 city, and several settlements. For example, King Vasak participated in the Paris invasion of Karik I (1003), and Sabbath II Ashotyan provided a two-thousand-strong army to King David Anhoghin of Tashir-Archaeologist during his conflict with Shaddad Abul-Aswar (1040) one of the centers. The Encyclopædia Britannica notes that from the 10th to the 11th centuries, Armenian literature, art, and architecture in Syunik and other Armenian provinces developed more freely than at any time since the 5th century. At the end of the 10th century, the monastery complex was significantly expanded. The Church of St. Stephen in Vaghadi was built in 1000, the Church of St. Karapet in 1006, and the Church of the Holy Mother of God in Vahanavank in 1086. The city of Kapan has expanded, agriculture and livestock have developed, as well as the timber industry. Crafts have developed significantly in Kapan, Tatev, and elsewhere. In the 12th century, the political situation in the kingdom deteriorated. The Seleucid invasions have dealt a devastating blow to the Armenian ethnic group. Syunik and other regions of Armenia gradually became the target of their conquest In 1103, the Seleucids captured and destroyed Capan, in 1104 the fortress of Vorotni, and a year later Bgen. "Dense darkness enveloped the Armenian people," wrote Stephen Orbelyan, describing these disasters. King Gregory II (1096 or 1103–1166) attempted to activate his foreign policy by referring to the successes of the Armenian-Georgian armies. However, during the temporary setbacks of the Georgian kingdom, the Seljuk emirs again intensified their pressure on Syunik.

=== Decline ===
Pressure on the Synagogue kingdom intensified in the middle of the 12th century, when the governorate of the Treasury was taken over by the Eltkuzian (Ildigizian) or Parvanian (Pahlavani) dynasty of Atropatia. King Gregory of the Syunik, who had no male children, married his daughter, Kata, to the prince of Czechoslovakia and made him heir. However, under the strict dominance of enemy forces, the kingdom could no longer be saved. In 1152, the Turks succeeded in conquering the fortress of Slorou, and five years later, in 1157, the fortress of Mali fell. In 1170, because of the betrayal of "simple Christians" in the village of Achaghu near Capan, the Turks captured the fortress of Balbard in the Syunik world. Some scholars believe that Baghdad was the middle of the city of Capan which is unacceptable because the historic city of Kapan was located on the right bank of the Voghji River, and the fortress of Baghdad met the stone of Baghdad on the left bank of the river.

The dissolution accelerated when the Georgian kingdom moved its armies to Ani and Shirak, Dvin, and Ararat in 1161-1162. Between 1166 and 1169, they captured Grkam, Geghi, and Kakavaberd. In 1170, they besieged Baghdad, the last stronghold of the kingdom, where King Hassan was located. The situation became very serious. After being ordained fortress guards, Hassan Gerakari and his family left for the night to his father's estates in Czechoslovakia. The Seleucids deceived Baghdad and organized a great massacre. In the kingdom's most impregnable fortress, the riches and valuable items brought from various monasteries were preserved for a long time. Baghdad was plundered and subjected to terrible devastation, and most of the above-mentioned manuscripts were destroyed as a result of the kingdom's culture.

After the fall of Baghdad, the other fortresses were forced to submit to the Yeltkuz atabek, and many freedmen and princes left Kapan. Stephen Orbelyan, contradicting himself, writes that the Syuni kingdom survived for more than 120 years than the kingdom of the Armenian Sultanates, that is, until 1165, which is incorrect. In fact, the Syuni kingdom lasted for about 183 years and withdrew from the political scene in 1170. King Gregory II of the Syuni, who had married his only daughter Kata, the prince of Hachen, had died with his brother Smbat as early as 1166. The liberation of northern Armenia from domination.

== List of kings ==
In fact, the last political formation of Armenia (in Armenia) was eliminated from the field of history, the kingdom of Synagogue, which persisted for 200 years. 1. Smbat A, son of Sacred – 970 (987)–998, 2. Vasak, son of Smbat I – 998-1040, 3. Sabbath B, son of Ashot (Ashotic)—1040–1051, 4. Gregory I's son Ashot (Ashotic)—1051–1072, 5. Sennacherib, son of Sevada – 1072–1094(1096), 6. Gregory II, son of Sennacherib–1096–1166, 7. Hassan Czechoslovakia – 1166–1170.

Stephen Orbelyan observes: "There is no such thing as a vacuum cleaner. "

«… The last Sennacherib,

Also Gregory's son,

Then and on the pillow of the pillow,

In the time of Eltekus,

The nation is a corrupt Persian,

Soon to bind the Devil, Satan,

Six hundred in our number,

And ten and five eternals."
