= Stepanos Asoghik =

Armenian writer of the 10th–11th centuries

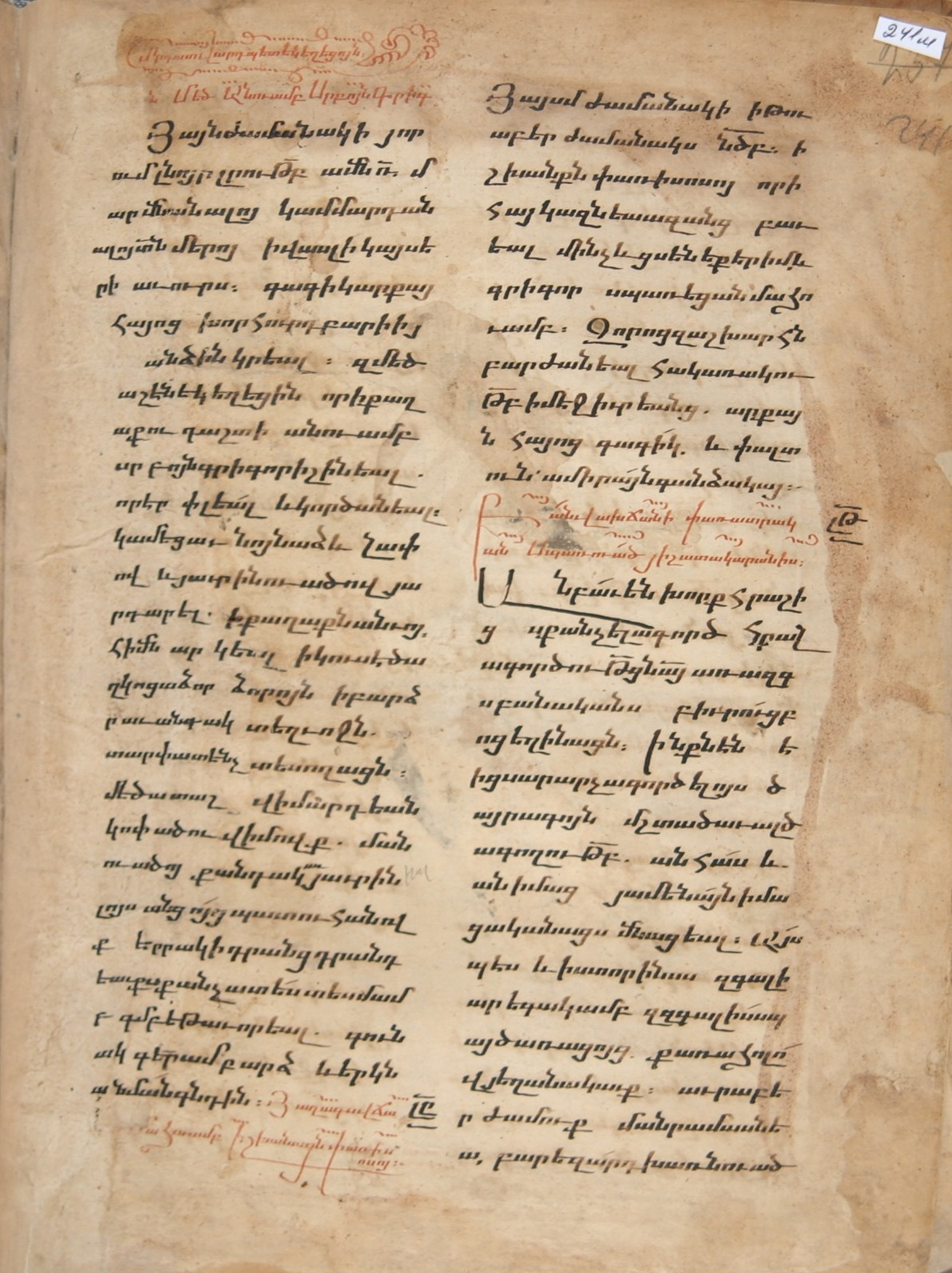
13th-century manuscript of Stepanos Taronetsi's Universal History

Stepanos Asoghik (Old Armenian: Ստեփանոս Ասողիկ, romanized: Step’anos Asołik), also known as Stepanos Taronetsi (Old Armenian: Ստեփանոս Տարօնեցի, romanized: Step’anos Tarōnec'i, lit. 'Stephen of Taron'), was an Armenian historian of the 10th–11th centuries.

The dates of his birth and death are unknown. His name indicates that he came from the region of Taron and earned the nickname Asoghik, meaning either 'little speaker' or 'singer'. He wrote a Universal History (Patmutiun Tiezerakan) in three books, which he completed in 1004 or early 1005. The first two books summarise the history of the world—with particular reference to Armenia—using the Bible, Eusebius of Caesarea, Movses Khorenatsi and others as sources. The third, most voluminous book deals with the history of the century leading up to Asoghik's own time.

== Life ==
Almost all that is known about Stepanos Asoghik's life comes from his own Universal History. His surname Taronetsi indicates that he was from the Armenian region of Taron. This is further supported by various statements that Asoghik makes in his history. He may have been born sometime between c. 950 and 970. He seems to have received a monastic education and was probably not a member of the princely dynasty of Taron. Stepan Malkhasyants believed that Asoghik studied at the Bagratid capital of Ani in his youth and served there for many years as a dpir (a lower rank in the Armenian Church), although Vardan Vardanyan writes that there is insufficient evidence to support this claim. He appears to have started out in a monastic community before going to live with an ascetic named Eremia (Jeremiah) near the hermitage of Teghenik in the canton of Nig in the foothills of Mount Aragats. He may have helped Catholicos Khachik I (r. 972/3–990/1) locate manuscripts for the catholicos's archives at Argina. At some point in the 990s, Khachik I's successor Sargis I ordered Asoghik to write his Universal History. At some point, probably while writing his history, he visited the monastery of Khladzor in the district of Derjan (around modern-day Tercan, Turkey) and conducted research there. His extensive knowledge of Armenian monasteries suggests that he made many such visits to different monasteries. He completed his three-book Universal History in 1004 or early 1005.

Stepanos's epithet Asoghik has been interpreted as 'little speaker' (asogh 'speaker' with the diminutive suffix -ik) or 'singer', in the sense of a church singer. Robert W. Thomson suggests the meaning 'teller [of tales]'. This name is never attributed to Stepanos in the extant manuscripts of his Universal History. The later 11th-century Armenian historian Aristakes Lastivertsi refers to him simply as Stepanos Taronatsi, but the 12th-century historian Samuel Anetsi calls him asghnik and specifies that he held the rank of vardapet. Later historians use the common form Asoghik. A reference to a certain "extremely old man Asoghnik" who wrote a commentary on the prophet Jeremiah by the 11th-century Armenian scholar Grigor Magistros is considered by some to be a reference to Stepanos. However, Tim Greenwood notes that this has not been proved and that it is possible that the historian Stepanos Taronetsi was later conflated with the author of the aforementioned commentary, Stepanos vardapet, called Asoghnik or Asoghik.

== Universal History ==
Stepanos Asoghik's Universal History (Patmutiun Tiezerakan) (Note: This title is not used in any of the extant manuscripts of Stepanos's history. In the manuscripts, it is always called the History (Patmutiun) of Stepanos Taronetsi.) covers all of human history from Creation to 1004/5. It covers both Armenian and non-Armenian history. It consists of three books of differing lengths, each divided into chapters. The first book is five chapters long and begins with Adam and ends with the beginning of the reign of Tiridates III of Armenia. The second book is six chapters long and extends from the time of Tiridates III to the restoration of the establishment of the Bagratid kingdom of Armenia in 884. The third book continues the history until 1004/5 and contains 48 chapters and a conclusion. The first two books are mostly, but not solely, derivative of other known sources. The third book is more original, particularly the sections on events that occurred during Stepanos's lifetime. The author names the sources that he used: the Old Testament, Josephus, Eusebius, Socrates Scholasticus, and nearly all of the Armenian historians which preceded him. In Greenwood's view, Stepanos also drew from a lost Byzantine chronicle for significant parts of the third book and perhaps also for information on Byzantine history in the first and second books. One feature of Stepanos's history which distinguishes it from earlier and later Armenian histories is his division of each chapter into sections on political events, religious history, and information on scholars and authors, in that order. According to Thomson, the third book resembles a "series of disconnected episodes" and lacks a cohesive narrative.

Within the Armenian historiographical tradition, Stepanos's history fills the gap between the earlier history of Hovhannes Draskhanakerttsi and the later history of Aristakes Lastivertsi. Stepanos wrote in a time of political and religious unrest in Armenia. Christological debates between dyophysites and monophysites were again raging. One half of the third book of the Universal History is the confession of faith of the Armenian Church, written by the order of Catholicos Khachik I and addressed to the Orthodox Metropolitan of Sebasteia.

== Translations ==
- Vseobshchaya Istoriya Stepanosa Taronskago, Asokh'ika po prozvaniyu, pisatelya XI stoletiya Всеобщая исторія Степаноса Таронскаго, Асох'ика по прозванію, писателя XI столѣтія (in Russian). Translation and commentary by N. Emin. Moscow: Lazarev Institute of Oriental Languages. 1864.
- Histoire universelle par Etienne Açoghʾig du Daron (in French). Translation and commentary by E. Dulaurier (part 1) and Frédéric Macler (part 2). Paris: E. Leroux. 1883–1917. (Part 1, part 2.)
- Des Stephanos von Taron Armenische Geschichte. Translation by Heinrich Gelzer and August Burckhardt. Leipzig: B. G. Teubner. 1907.
- The Universal History of Step'anos Tarōnec'i. Introduction, translation and commentary by Tim Greenwood. Oxford University Press. 2017. ISBN 9780198792512.
