= Shirakavan (ancient city) =

Historical capital of Armenia

- Շիրակաւան (Armenian)
- Yerazgavors (Armenian: Երազգաւորս)
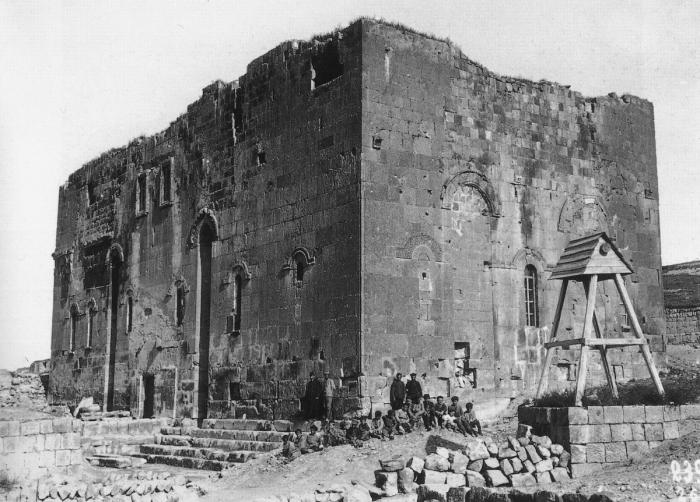
- The Armenian Church of Surp Prkich (Holy Saviour) in Shirakavan before 1923

- Location within Turkey
- 40°41′39″N 43°44′12″E
- Location: The location of the current village of Çetindurak, on the right bank of Akhurian River, Turkey

History
- Built: 7th century
- Abandoned: 1920

Shirakavan (Armenian: Շիրակաւան); founded as Yerazgavors and later Yerazgavork, was a medieval Armenian city and one of the 13 historic capitals of Armenia, serving as a capital city between 890 and 929 during the Bagratid Kingdom of Armenia.

The city was located on the right bank of Akhurian River to the northeast of Ani, corresponding with the current village of Çetindurak of Akyaka district of Kars Province, within the Republic of Turkey.

== History ==
A settlement existed on this territory as early as the 3rd–2nd centuries BC. This is attested by the Georgian chronicler Leonti Mroveli, who noted that during the time of Artaxias I, the Georgian king and the northern highlanders attacked Armenia, plundered Shirakavan and other settlements. Although very little information has been preserved about Shirakavan as a capital, it is mentioned in the works of Sebeos, Stepanos Asoghik, Samuel Anetsi, Vardan Areveltsi and other chroniclers.

In his 7th century History, historian Sebeos mentions Shirakavan as a village. This was the first mention of Shirakavan in Armenian historiography. In 869, a theological council chaired by Catholicos Zakaria I Dzaghetsi was held in Shirakavan. This fact indicates that even before being proclaimed a capital, Shirakavan was an important settlement.

In the 9th century, during the Bagratid Kingdom, the city had a fortress and other defensive structures, while the fortress of Tignis, located 3 km away, later became an important defensive stronghold of the capital Ani.

During the 160 years of its existence, the Bagratid Kingdom changed capitals four times. During the reigns of Smbat I and Ashot II the Iron, Shirakavan served as the royal residence and capital of the state for about 40 years. It was initially known as Yerazgavors, and later as Shirakavan. The historian Vardan Areveltsi writes that Smbat Bagratuni built the Church of the Holy All-Savior in Shirakavan and was crowned there. The church remained standing until the 1950s. During their reigns, Smbat I and Ashot the Iron strengthened the royal residence from a military standpoint. Shirakavan had fortresses and a number of defensive structures. During the reign of Abas I (928–953), the capital of the kingdom was moved from Yerazgavors to Kars.

In different historical periods, the city was repeatedly destroyed by the Seljuk Turks, the Tatar-Mongols, the Turkmens and the Persians. During the Seljuk Turkish campaign in the 11th century, in 1064, Shirakavan was destroyed. According to an inscription by Bishop Barsegh, in the second half of the 12th century the city was restored and experienced a period of development under the Zakarid principality. However, from the second half of the 13th century, it turned into an ordinary village.

During the period of Turkish rule, the name Shirakavan, as a result of phonetic changes, became Bash-Shoragyal. After its annexation to the Russian Empire, the village became part of Kars Oblast and experienced a certain degree of development. At the beginning of the 20th century, it was a large Armenian-populated village, with 208 houses and 1,601 inhabitants. In 1877, the Sahakyan school was opened in the village. Arshak Aslamazyan built a mill there using equipment he had brought from Germany. Inspired by the excavations of Ani carried out by Nikolai Marr and following his advice, Aslamazyan began excavations in Shirakavan, as a result of which a large amount of archaeological material was discovered.

Ashkharbek Kalantar, Joseph Orbeli, Taragros, Toros Toramanian, Nikolai Buniatyan and Avetik Isahakyan visited Shirakavan either to conduct excavations or as guests. The latter’s native village, Ghazarapat, was located not far from Shirakavan.

After Kars Oblast was handed over to Turkey in 1920–1921, the materials discovered during the excavations were destroyed or disappeared. The Armenian population of Bash-Shoragyal moved to Soviet Armenia. Some of the migrants settled in the modern village of Yerazgavors in Shirak Province.

== The 20th century ==
In 1914, prior to the Armenian genocide, Shirakavan was a quite large Armenian settlement with a population of 1220. After the Turkish–Armenian War of 1920, Shirakavan was abandoned and the Armenian population of the village moved to Eastern Armenia and settled in the newly-formed village of Yerazgavors. Later in 1921, the territory of Kars including Shirakavan, was officially handed over to the Turks by the Treaty of Kars.

The church of Surp Prkich was partly ruined by the beginning of the 20th century. After it was blown up by the Turks in 1954 during regular military training of the Turkish Army, only the western wall of the church survived. Other parts of ancient Shirakavan were flooded by the waters of a dam built on the Akhurian River.
