= Dzoraget =

Dzoraget Ձորագետ
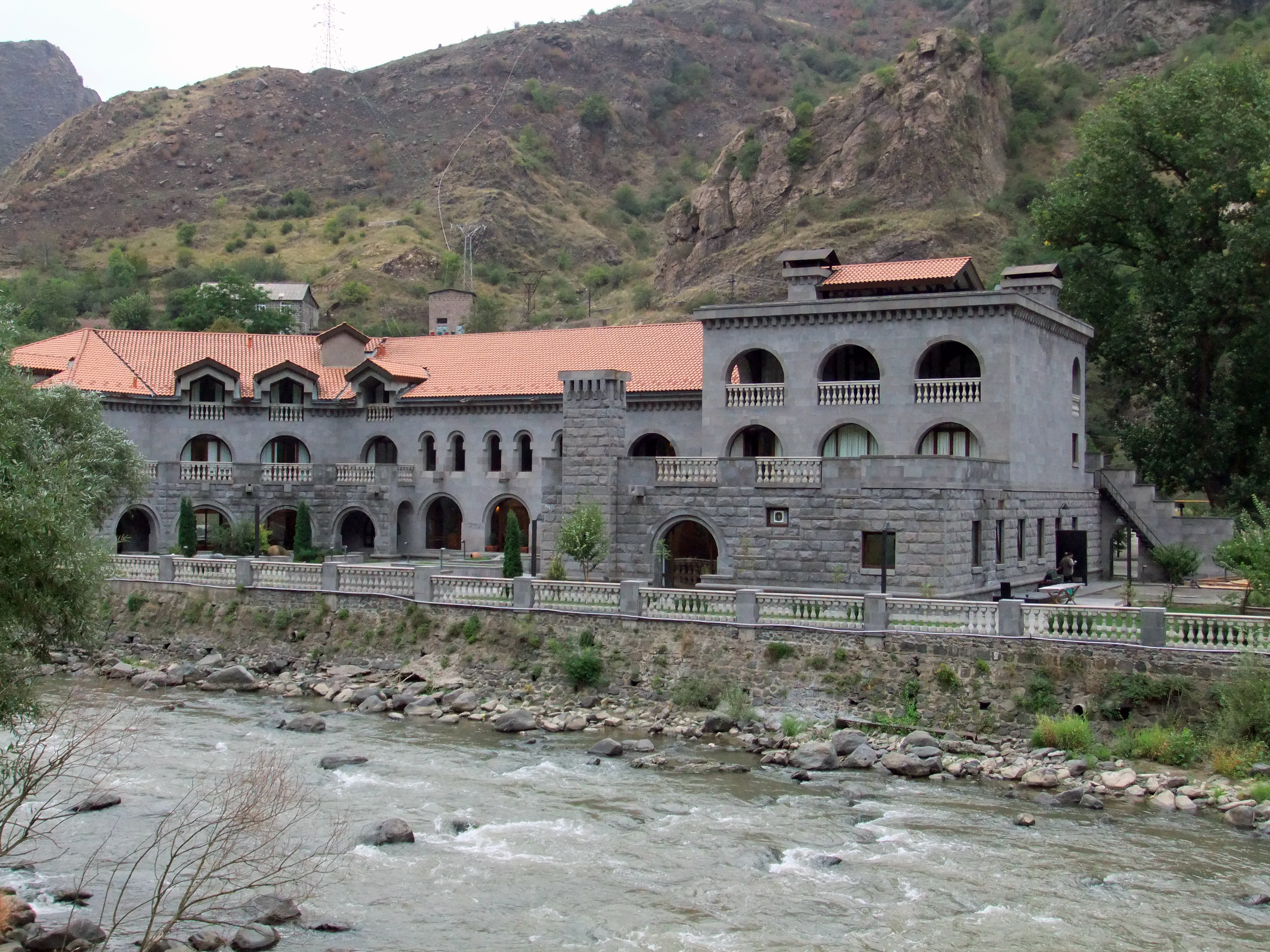
- Avan-Dzoraget resort on Dzoraget River

- Location within Armenia
- Coordinates: 40°56′N 44°34′E
- Country: Armenia
- Marz (Province): Lori Province
- Elevation: 1,000 m (3,300 ft)

Population (2011)
  - Total: 259
- Time zone: UTC+4 ( )

Dzoraget (Armenian: Ձորագետ), is a village in the Lori Province of Armenia.
