= Samuel Anetsi =

Armenian historian and priest of the 12th century

Samuel Anetsi also Samuel of Ani was an Armenian historian and priest of the 12th century. Samuel is known for his writing of history and chronicles a book where he is the first author to use the Armenian Chronology. Samuel was also a disciple of Hovhannes Imastaser. According to the Penny Cyclopaedia, "Samuel of Ani wrote a concise but accurate chronological work, extending from Adam to the pontificate of Gregory Vikayaser."

Samuel was born in Ani, the ancient capital of Armenia.
