= Armenian historiography of the 5th–18th centuries =

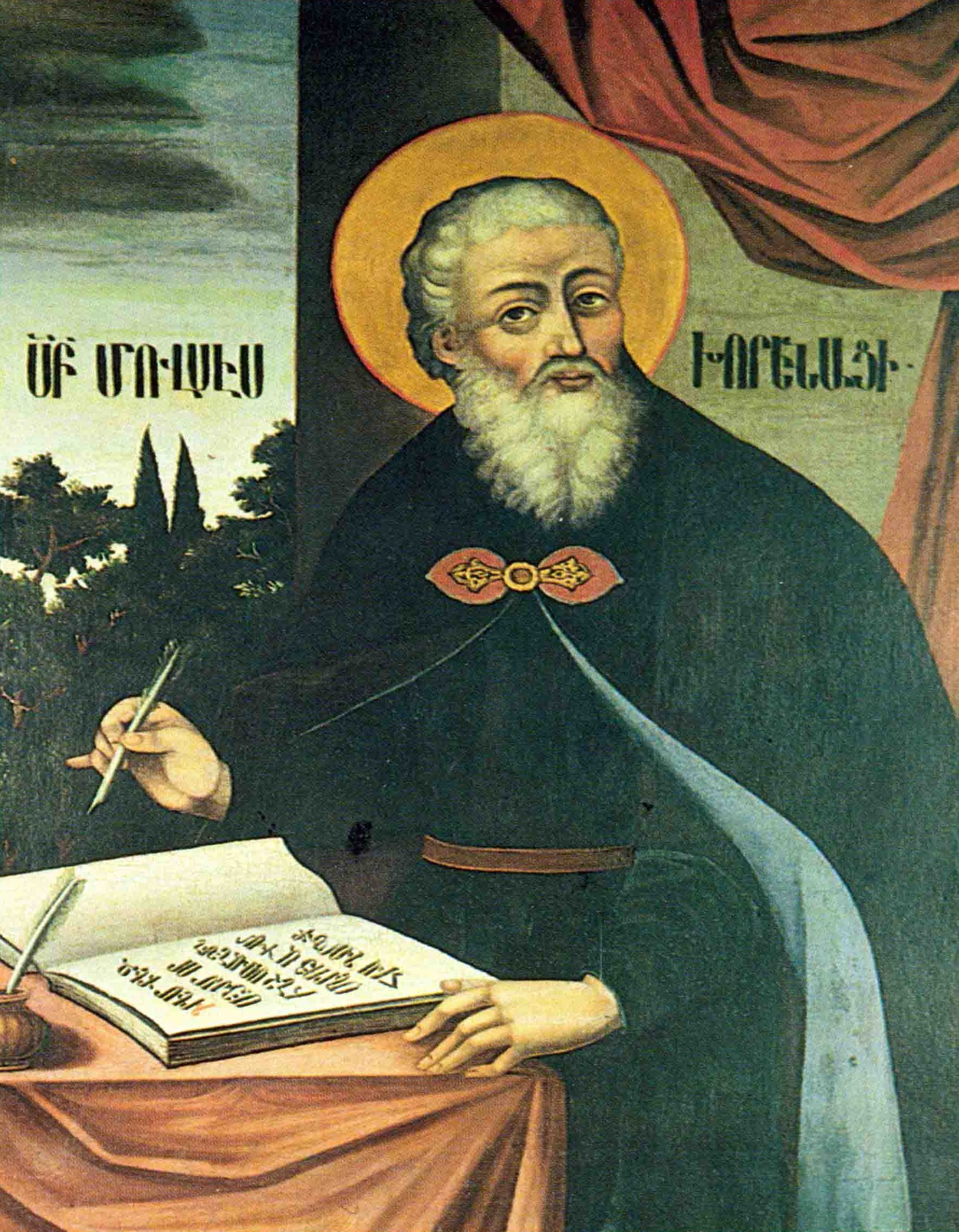
Movses Khorenatsi — "father of Armenian historiography". Painting by Hovnatan Hovnatanian, 18th century

Armenian historiography from the 5th to 18th centuries refers to the body of works by Armenian authors from the 5th to 18th centuries (chronicles, annals, and other sources) dedicated to the history of Armenia itself, while also containing extensive information about neighboring states and regions, including the South Caucasus, Byzantium, and the Middle East. Emerging at the twilight of antiquity, Armenian historiography held a dominant position in medieval Armenian literature. The 5th to 18th centuries encompass the pre-modern period of Armenian historiography.

Periods of decline and revival in Armenia's cultural activity corresponded to changes in its political situation. The earliest report of creating a historical narrative in Armenia dates back to the 1st century BCE. The writing, explanation, and preservation of the history of the Armenian people were initially among the primary tasks of the educated class, and the 5th century became the golden age of national literature. During this time, a continuous historiographical tradition emerged, where authors began their narratives from the historical period or date where their predecessors left off.

In the mid-6th century, the Armenian ecclesiastical calendar was introduced. From the 7th century, starting with the Arab conquest, due to the circumstances, the works of some historians took on a universal character in both chronological and geographical terms, giving rise to the genres of chronicles and historical geography.

A new surge in historiography occurred in the 10th to 14th centuries, primarily associated with the restoration of the Armenian state first by the Bagratids and later in Cilicia. The 14th century marked a period of decline, linked to the invasions of Tatar-Mongol tribes and the Mamluk incursion, lasting over two centuries, during which no significant historical works were produced. The historical literature of this period consists mainly of minor chronicles and manuscript colophons. The next revival of historiography occurred in the 17th century. The last major figure of Armenian medieval historiography and a precursor to modern historical scholarship is considered to be Mikayel Chamchian, author of the three-volume History of Armenia (1784–1786).

Since the late Middle Ages, historiography also developed among the Armenian diaspora in countries across Asia and Europe.

Armenian medieval historical philosophy centered on the idea of the chosenness of the Armenians. The loss of independence and hostile surroundings also shaped Armenian historical philosophy.

The works of Armenian historians and chroniclers are rich with data about neighboring states, regions, and peoples with whom the Armenians interacted.

There are several versions of the periodization of ancient and medieval Armenian literature. Henrik Bakhchinyan identifies the following four stages: 5th–9th centuries, 10th–12th centuries, 13th–16th centuries, and 17th–18th centuries.

== Armenian historiography before the 5th century ==
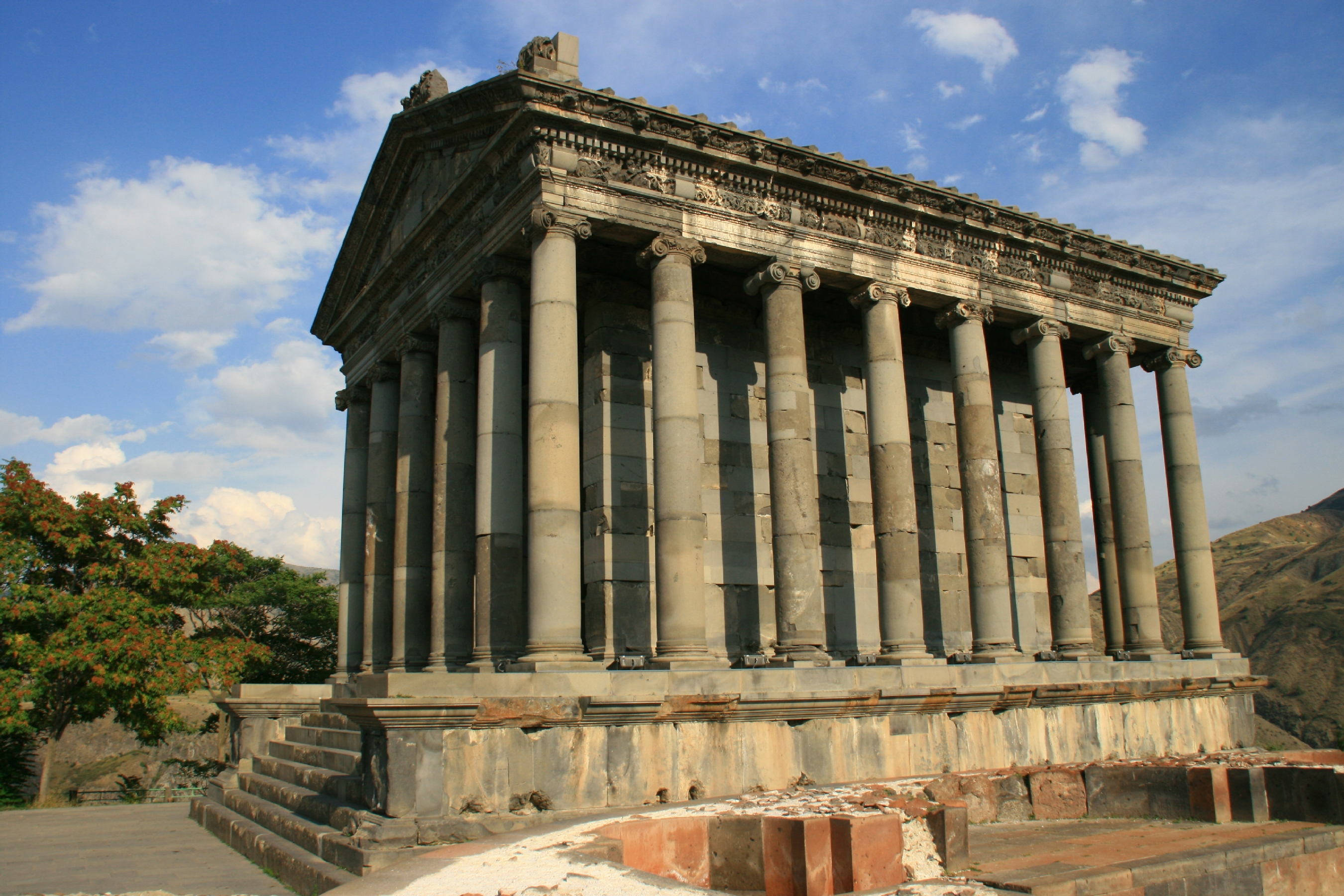
Temple of Garni, 1st century CE

According to M. Diakonov and O. Kudryavtsev, in the 3rd to 1st centuries BCE, the Armenians used special secret scripts to write temple books and chronicles. Other specialists, however, reject the assumption of the existence of literature in the Armenian language during the pre-Christian period. According to Robert W. Thomson, the Armenians were acquainted with classical culture long before the 5th century CE — ancient sources report the influence of Greek literature and ideas, especially in the Armenian royal court. However, literature in the Armenian language began its development relatively late. The political and social individuality of Armenia and the Armenians dates back to the time of the Ancient Persian Empire (6th–4th centuries BCE), but national Armenian literature, according to Thomson, was a product of Christian times.

Thomson noted that Armenians were known in the universities of the Greek-speaking world as teachers and scholars, and the king Artavasdes II, who lived in the 1st century BCE, gained a reputation as an author of plays and histories in the Greek language. As reported by Plutarch, Artavasdes' works survived into his time: "...Artavasdes even composed tragedies and wrote speeches and historical works, some of which have been preserved". The German historian A. H. Heeren hypothesized that the historical work of the Armenian king could have served as a source for Plutarch in some parts of his history, particularly regarding the biography of Crassus, his eastern campaign, and the Battle of Carrhae. While not denying this possibility, W. Tarn believed that Artavasdes was unlikely to have possessed historical thinking.

According to the accounts of Movses Khorenatsi, historical literature in Armenia, besides the royal court, also existed in pagan temples among the priesthood. Temples and priesthood played a significant role in the economic, social, and especially cultural life of the Ancient East and Hellenistic states. Temples were centers of cultural development, particularly for science and literature. The priesthood sought to monopolize literary activity in the state. Khorenatsi also mentioned temple histories compiled by Olympos, a priest of the sanctuary of Aramazd in Ani-Kamakh, comparing them to Persian books and Armenian epic songs. According to Movses, in the 2nd–3rd centuries, Bardaisan studied these histories and translated them into Syriac. In debate with G. Gelzer, K. Trever pointed to information about the archives of Armenian kings in Ani-Kamakh as evidence of the existence of Armenian literature in the Hovhannesian tradition. James Russell believed that the historian of the temple of Ani could have been a local priest with a Greek name, like his colleagues in Lydia.

== Armenian historical philosophy ==
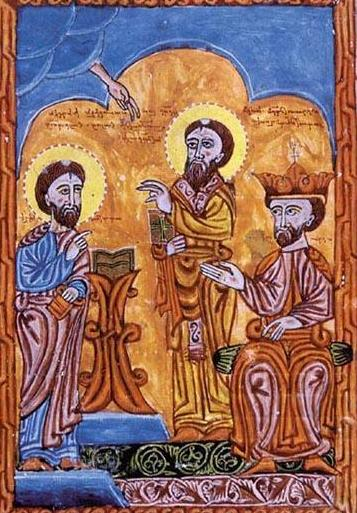
Historian Agathangelos, Gregory the Illuminator, and King Tiridates III, 16th-century manuscript

From the outset, Armenian historiography pursued both informative and moralistic objectives: to help the reader avoid evil and follow examples of virtuous behavior. The course of history was considered the result of God's providence. Robert Thomson emphasized that the moral ideals of Armenian historians were shaped under the influence of ancient Hebrew literature and were more connected to the struggle for the survival of the Armenian people and the preservation of their traditions than to Christianity. According to Thomson, "Armenian historians saw parallels between the fate of Israel and the fate of their own country". Tara Lee Andrews noted that Armenian historical philosophy initially viewed Armenia's past as a continuation of the biblical history of the chosen people. Petra Košťálová argued that the concept of the history of a chosen people is one of the main features of Armenian collective identity. Whether through the example of the outstanding deeds and wisdom of their political patrons or on more general principles, historians sought to teach the true model of behavior. Thomson considered Agathangelos, Yeghishe, and Movses Khorenatsi the three main authors who "defined the Armenians' relationship to their place in the world".

After the emergence of Islam in the 7th century, no drastic change occurred in the understanding of the goals of historiography. Only conceptual questions arose regarding the struggle against the new adversary. According to Theo Maarten van Lint, the era posed a complex question: "why did the Arabs, now Muslims, suddenly disrupt the existing order of things". A contemporary of the early Arab invasions, Sebeos, sought explanations for dramatic changes in biblical prophecies. At the end of the 9th century, the restoration of the Armenian state confirmed the historical philosophy of Ghewond, who wrote about Armenia's liberation from Muslim rule. By this time, the main concepts and philosophy of Armenian history had already been formed. This pertains to both the theoretical questions of historiography, its frameworks, and goals, as well as the conceptual questions of Armenian history. Following the classics of the golden age, in the early 10th century, Hovhannes Draskhanakerttsi wrote about the educational significance of history. In the early 11th century, amid increasing pressure from Byzantium, Armenia's political and ecclesiastical institutions gradually weakened. On the eve of major historical transformations, Stepanos Taronetsi proposed his definition of Armenian identity, which he based on shared cultural memory and did not tie to ecclesiastical-political institutions. According to Tim Greenwood, such a structure of identity was capable of withstanding political and social upheavals. In the long term, it proved remarkably resilient. From the second half of the 11th century, historians again faced the task of interpreting the reasons for the loss of independence and the conquest of the country, this time by the Seljuks. Aristakes Lastivertsi saw the cause of God's wrath and the ensuing immediate retribution in the sins of the Armenian people. He emphasized that understanding the past was a means of repentance and avoiding spiritual ruin. As in the times of the Arabs, large-scale transformations in the geopolitical landscape were interpreted through the Bible. In the early 12th century, Matteos Urhayetsi adapted the image of the fourth beast in the vision of Daniel to the Turks. All calamities were seen as God's warnings, and the study of history could serve the salvation of the soul. Within the already established historical philosophy, he believed that "the recent failures to which the Armenians were subjected were signs of God's displeasure with His people". Efforts continued to develop methodological principles for writing history. Thus, in the late 12th century, Samuel Anetsi proposed a tripartite division of time into past, present, and future. Anetsi noted that "the interests of humanity seem more connected to the past and the future than to the present". Decades later, Mkhitar Anetsi understood the study of the past as a means to achieve spiritual enlightenment. In the Armenian version of Michael the Syrian's Chronicle, the purpose of historiography was declared to be the fight against ignorance and the instruction of the Christian reader. From the 13th–14th centuries, some historians, as an introduction to Armenian history, included not only the story of Adam and his descendants but also reflections on the nature of God Himself. Vardan Areveltsi found that creativity was a way to know the Creator, with perfect knowledge belonging only to Him. Through their inquiries, humans merely prepare to understand eternal truths. The subsequent Turkish-Persian yoke, similar to the Seljuk conquest and the Mongol invasion, was explained by the "sinfulness" of the Armenians.

As noted by Oxford specialist in ancient Armenian literature Robert Thomson, medieval Armenian authors created their own high ideals—both religious and national. Although steeped in knowledge of Greek and Syriac literature, they nevertheless managed to form an original interpretation of history. Their political, cultural, and national ideals and ideas profoundly influenced the collective consciousness of the Armenians. For example, the political image of Armenia projected in Khorenatsi's work retained its influence into modern times, as did the concept of nahatak introduced by Yeghishe — a person who died for the defense of faith and country.

== Historiography of the 5th to 9th centuries ==
=== Golden Age: historical ideals' formation ===
As noted by James Howard-Johnston, Armenia in late antiquity was a crucial component of the South Caucasus. Occupying a vast geographical zone, the Armenians were a more powerful force than their northern neighbors, the Iberians and numerous peoples of the Caucasus, and in the east, they brought the Albanians into their cultural orbit. In the early 4th century, Greater Armenia adopted Christianity as the state religion, leading to an orientation toward Western civilization. The Armenian worldview, previously within the Iranian cultural and religious orbit, underwent a radical transformation. The new "Christian perspective" became dominant in historiography as well. In 387, Armenia was partitioned between the Rome and Persia, with the larger part ceded to the latter. In 428, at the request of Armenian nakharars, the Sasanian shah abolished royal authority in Armenia, and the country was henceforth governed by appointed marzpans. Adhering to Zoroastrianism, the Sasanians repeatedly attempted to impose their religion on the recently Christianized Armenians, leading to serious conflicts. Following the Battle of Avarayr in 451 and the war of 484, the Armenians secured religious autonomy within the Persian Empire.

For roughly a century after the official adoption of Christianity, the Bible was available only in Greek and Syriac. To facilitate the translation of the Holy Scriptures, the Christian preacher Mashtots created the Armenian alphabet around 406, which modern scholars view as part of the country's Christianization process. Soon after, a widespread translation movement emerged in Armenia, and by the mid-5th century, the first original works began to appear. Despite the complex political situation, the 5th century became the Golden Age of Armenian literature of literature, with historiography reaching its peak in the second half of the century. A significant number of historical works emerged, and the main characteristics of historical prose were established. The initial stage of written historiography marked a radical shift in the principles of preserving historical memory. As noted by Theo Maarten van Lint, prior to this, the Armenians had a well-developed tradition of transmitting memory orally through gusans — poet-performers. O. Kudryavtsev attributed the richness of Armenian literature compared to Middle Persian literature partly to the accessibility of the newly created script. Robert Thomson explained the rapid development of literature immediately after the creation of the script by the Armenians' familiarity with late antique culture and support from higher authorities—the king and the catholicos. The translations of Eusebius of Caesarea's Ecclesiastical History and Chronicle played a significant role in the further development of historiography. According to Thomson, the Ecclesiastical History served as a model for writing history in a Christian context, while the Chronicle was a primary source for later knowledge about the empires of the ancient world. It was one of the main sources about the non-Armenian world. By adopting the Chronicle as their model, Armenian authors accorded their country an equal place in world history. By integrating oral traditions about the origins of the Armenians into this framework of world history, they demonstrated the antiquity of Armenia as a distinct and unique nation. Additionally, according to Theo van Lint, the religious struggle with the Persians throughout the 5th century left a profound mark on historiography. The motif of loyalty to the homeland and Christian faith in the works of early classical historians became part of historical thought. Another characteristic of historical works from this period, according to Tara Lee Andrews, is that they were written from the perspective of the Sasanian half of Armenia and contain little information about relations with the Western world. French Armenologist Jean-Pierre Mahé characterized pre-Arab Armenian historiography as biblical, national, unitary, and Mamikonian-focused, centered around the leading noble family in the country after the departure of the Arsacids from the historical stage. The historians traditionally associated with the Golden Age of Armenian literature include Koryun, Agathangelos, Yeghishe, Faustus of Byzantium, Ghazar Parpetsi, and Movses Khorenatsi.

The first known original historical work, written in the Armenian language, is Koryun'sThe Life of Mashtots, authored by Mashtots' disciple. Written between 443 and 450, the Life describes the life of his teacher, the creation of the Armenian alphabet, the establishment of the first schools, and the emergence of Armenian literature. For Koryun, the Bible and the Old Testament were testimonies to the history of the chosen people. In his historical philosophy, he proposed an expanded interpretation of this concept, considering Christians, and in this case, the Armenians, as the new people of God. He based this on the advent of the Christian era and the Armenians' conversion to it. As Jean-Pierre Mahé noted, the history of the Armenians after their baptism acquired, in Koryun's eyes, the same significance and value as the Holy Scriptures.

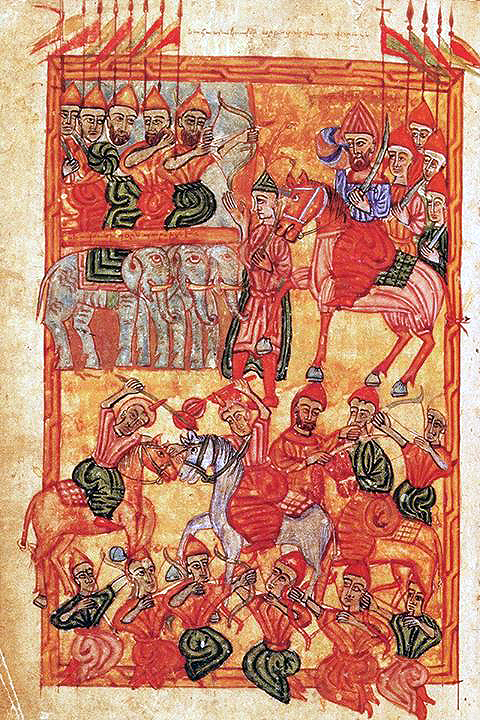
On Vardan and the Armenian War by Yeghishe, 1569 manuscript

Koryun's work served as one of the sources for Agathangelos' History of Armenia. Written in the last third of the 5th century, the book contains important information about the social structure of Greater Armenia during the reign of Tiridates III, the adoption of Christianity as the state religion, the activities of Gregory the Illuminator, and the struggle against ancient Armenian religion. Overall, the History of Armenia covers a period of over a century, from 224 to the death of Gregory around 330. The surviving text is a redaction from the 7th–8th centuries. The work was translated early into other languages: in the 5th century into Greek, in the 7th–8th centuries into Arabic, with various versions preserved in medieval Latin, Ethiopic, and Slavic literatures. Agathangelos was the first author to shape perceptions of the origins of Christianity in Armenia. The Tiridates III and Gregory the Illuminator's times, as described by Agathangelos, later became for Armenians an image of the golden age of their history. For many centuries, their authors wrote about the need to restore Armenia's independence, understood as the restoration of the secular and spiritual authority of the descendants of Tiridates and Gregory.

Like Agathangelos, the historian Yeghishe was a pivotal figure who influenced subsequent Armenian chroniclers. His work On Vardan and the Armenian War recounts the history of Armenia from 428 to 465. The work narrates events from the fall of the Arsacid state to the Battle of Avarayr in 451, including details of the battle itself. Like Koryun, Yeghishe embraced the historical philosophy of the chosenness of the Armenian people. Using a wide range of literary sources, including the Books of Maccabees, Yeghishe drew parallels between the history of the Armenians and the Jews, who fought for their religious freedom. Yeghishe had two priorities—recording history and creating a code of conduct for future generations, asserting the moral duty of the historian. According to Howard-Johnston, Yeghishe's moral ideals centered on protecting Armenian traditions, promoting virtue, and condemning vice.

The history of Faustus of Byzantium, Buzandaran Patmutyunk, had somewhat less influence than Yeghishe's work. It survives partially, lacking the first two chapters on the pre-Christian era. Written in the 470s during preparations for an Armenian uprising against the Sasanians, the chronicle is valuable for understanding the socio-political and cultural history of the nation during the transitional period between 330 and 387. In contrast to Agathangelos, Faustus demonstrated that the Christianization of Armenia was a long and gradual process. The work reflects Roman-Armenian and Armenian-Persian relations. With Buzandaran Patmutyunk, the continuity of Armenian historiography emerged, where each historian viewed their work as part of a unified, continuous narrative. Faustus began his history where Agathangelos' account ends. In Theo van Lint's words, Buzand "builds his work as a brick in the wall of the building of Armenian historiography".

Decades later, Ghazar Parpetsi considered his history a continuation of Buzandaran Patmutyunk. Although Parpetsi held a low opinion of Buzand, following the established historiographical tradition, he referenced Agathangelos and Buzand as his predecessors. Parpetsi saw his task as historically organizing the diverse events of Armenia's past. Biographical details indicate that he served for some time as the abbot of the Vagharshapat Monastery, from which he was forced to leave under pressure from a conservative faction of the clergy. His History of Armenia was written at the turn of the 5th–6th centuries, around 500. It consists of three parts, covering the period from the First Partition of Armenia in 387 to the end of the 5th century. The book narrates the Armenian uprisings against Persian rule in 449–451 and 481–484, and the restoration of Armenian self-governance. Parpetsi's narrative clarifies and complements Yeghishe's work.

==== The First Universal History of Armenia's creation: Movses Khorenatsi ====
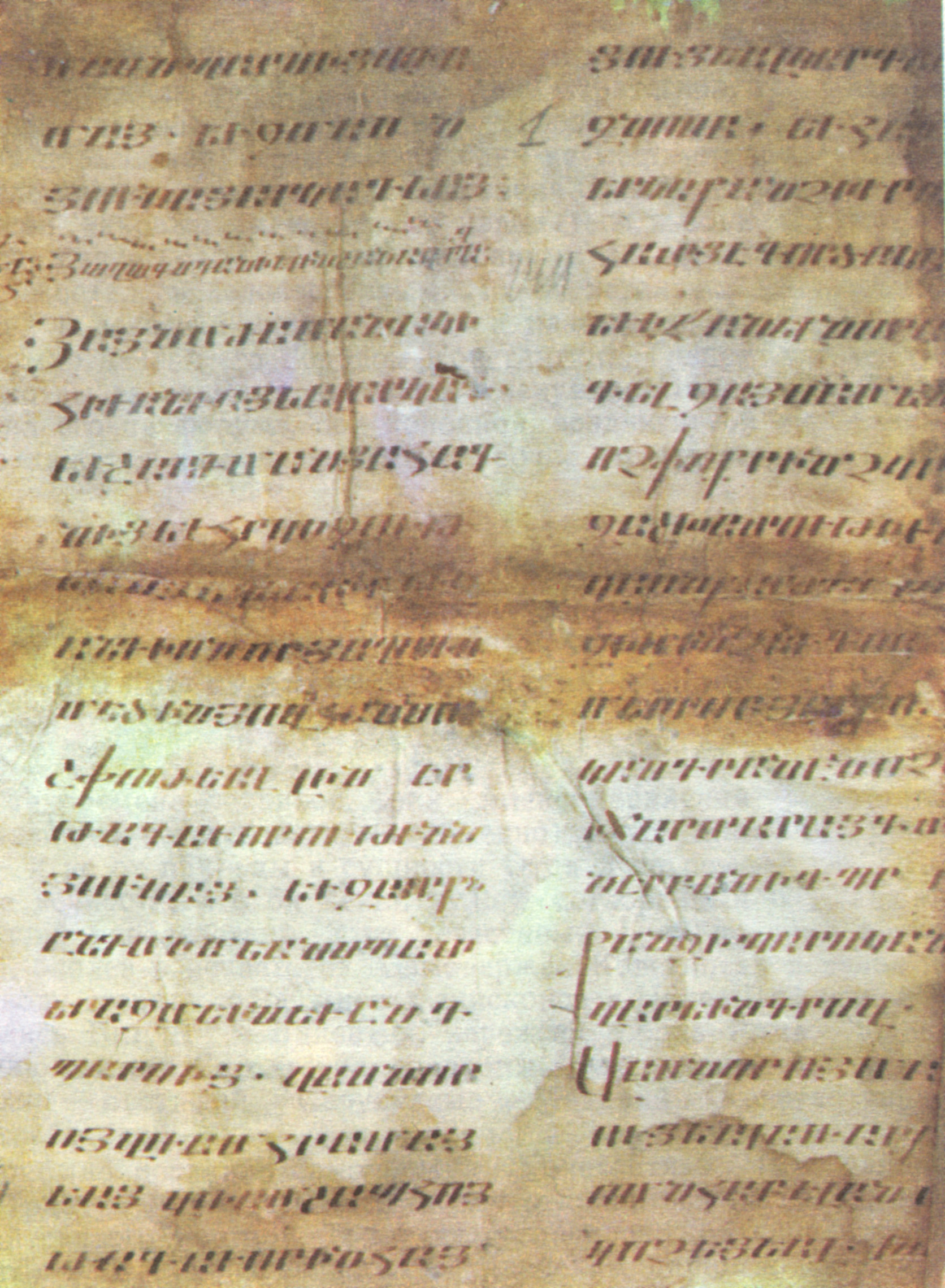
History of Armenia by Movses Khorenatsi. Page from a 10-11th manuscript

The most prominent historian of the early classical period is Movses Khorenatsi, author of the monumental History of Armenia. According to the prevailing opinion, Khorenatsi worked in the 5th century, though some scholars place him in the 7th–9th centuries. For example, Howard-Johnston dates his life to the early 8th century.

Khorenatsi's History of Armenia is the first universal history of Armenia, and its author is the first Armenian historian to elaborate clearly on the goals and methods of historical work. Khorenatsi used a wide range of external sources, including Greek secular and ecclesiastical literature. The reliability, conciseness, and chronological accuracy of his narrative align it with the works of classical antiquity authors. To maintain these standards, Khorenatsi employed a method of comparative source analysis. Additionally, the historian valued the importance of oral traditions, though he noted their symbolic rather than literal significance. According to Theo Maarten van Lint, Khorenatsi, along with Faustus of Byzantium, is the primary author who recorded and preserved fragments of pre-Christian Armenian oral literature. By incorporating these traditions into the framework of Eusebius's Chronicle, he placed Armenia in the context of ancient world history. Like Eusebius, Khorenatsi began his narrative from the creation of the world according to the Book of Genesis. According to his concept, through Japheth and Togarmah, the genealogy of the Armenians traces back to the biblical Noah. In three books, he chronicled from legendary times, discussed Armenia's known role between the Parthia and the Greco-Roman world, and concluded with events of the Christian era. As noted by A. Novoseltsev, the historian brilliantly executed this grandiose plan for its time, and although he is not the first Armenian historian chronologically, he was dubbed the "father of Armenian historiography". This epithet is found as early as the 10th century.

According to the Oxford Dictionary of Byzantium, Khorenatsi was the first Armenian historian to develop a clearly defined historical philosophy. In Robert Thomson's view, the works of Khorenatsi, Yeghishe, and Agathangelos are among the primary sources for understanding the Armenian perspective on history and their traditional values. Unlike Yeghishe, Khorenatsi emphasized secular virtues. According to Howard-Johnston, while not denying spiritual values or pious deeds, Khorenatsi saw the primary purpose of history as recording great deeds for future generations. Using Josephus's Jewish War as a source describing Armenia's role in the Roman-Parthian conflict, he employed it as a literary model, constructing an image of Armenia as a small country whose history deserved worldwide recognition.

Khorenatsi had the greatest influence on subsequent generations and was one of the most widely read authors in the Armenian cultural milieu. Almost all medieval Armenian historians followed Khorenatsi's concept of writing history from Adam to their own time, emphasizing the unity of the history of the creation of the world and the Armenian people. Throughout the rest of the Middle Ages, Armenian historiography adhered to Khorenatsi's principles and methodological guidelines. The glorious past of Armenia he portrayed, as a country asserting its rights in dealings with the great empires of antiquity, remained a source of inspiration for subsequent generations.

=== Further historiography development ===
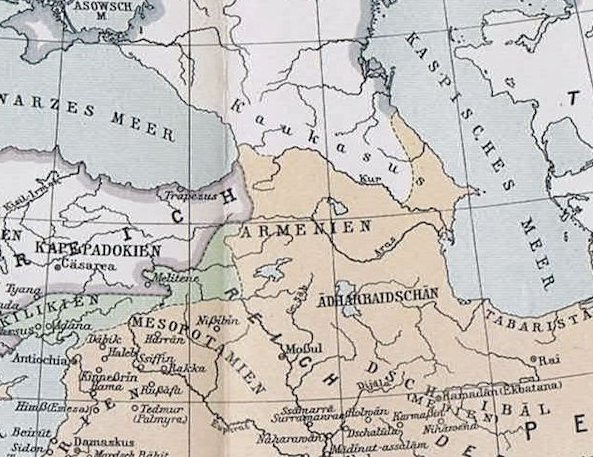
Armenia within the borders of the Arab Caliphate, circa 750

For nearly the entire second half of the 6th century, Armenia was a battleground in the Byzantine-Sasanian War, and in 591, roughly two centuries after the first partition, it was partitioned again. For services rendered to the recently ascended young shah Khosrow II, Emperor Maurice received the larger part of Sasanian Armenia. In external Byzantine and Syriac sources, Armenians feature as key players in the wars between the region's major powers — Byzantium and Persia. For various military-political reasons, Armenian soldiers and their families were deliberately relocated to different regions of the Byzantine Empire. A similar policy was enacted in the east, where Armenians were required to serve in the Sasanian army. This led to the formation of Armenian colonies outside Armenia.

Historiography in the 6th century experienced a decline; the only surviving work from this era is the Chronography of Atanas Taronatsi. The author provided important chronological references, particularly for the history of the first centuries CE. Using the works of 5th-century historiographers as sources, Taronatsi's Chronography became particularly significant for compiling critical texts of earlier Armenian historians. Like his predecessors, Taronatsi structured his narrative by the reigns of kings, but after 552, historians adopted the Armenian era of chronology.

The fall of the Sasanian Empire and the establishment of Arab hegemony in Armenia around 650 drastically altered the political landscape. Armenians had to adapt to life within the new Islamic world. Mountain fortresses, ancient local nobility, and the new Christian religion became means of resistance to emerging challenges. Since late antiquity, the latter played a crucial role in preserving Armenian identity and semi-independence. James Howard-Johnston emphasized the constant awareness among Armenian historians of their country's precarious position between the region's major powers. Historiography saw innovations, notably an expanded geographical scope of reported information. While events in neighboring states were previously mentioned only when directly related to Armenia or the activities of prominent Armenians, this changed thereafter. According to Tara Lee Andrews, after the capture of Jerusalem in 637, Armenian historians needed to explain the rise of the Arabs, with which their secular and religious elite sought reconciliation. Unlike the works of the 5th–6th centuries, which focused primarily on Armenia, new works became chronologically and geographically more universal. The collapse of the old world order, which allowed Armenia to balance between Rome and Persia, necessitated a new perspective on the historical process. Historians sought to understand distant events that impacted their country's fate. Nevertheless, Armenian historical philosophy did not undergo a drastic change. Historiography became characterized by apocalyptic themes, prophecies, visions, and laments, though these are not present in all works. With the creation of the Ashkharhatsuyts, historical geography emerged. During the same period, in 696–697, the translation of Socrates Scholasticus's Ecclesiastical History was completed, which, like the previously translated Chronicle and Ecclesiastical History of Eusebius, influenced the formation of an original literary tradition. Amid a complete shift in the world order, historiography played a crucial role in describing and preserving Armenian identity. Due to the threat of forced conversion to Islam, the theme of adherence to Christianity gained even greater significance in historical literature, supported by the nobility and church leaders.

The issue of the emergence of Islam as a new force was first addressed in the work History of the Emperor Heraclius by Sebeos, written in the 650s–660s, one of the most important witnesses to the Arab conquests. Some researchers consider him the only significant non-Muslim author writing about the initial period of Arab expansion. Sebeos presented Armenia's state in the context of Byzantine-Sasanian relations. His main theme covered the 6th–7th centuries — the reign of Khosrow II and the early Muslim expansion. Particular attention was given to Armenia's role on the international stage. In addition to information about the arrival of Arabs in Armenia, the book describes the Persian campaigns of the Byzantine emperor of Armenian origin Heraclius, the spread of Islam, and the collapse of the Persian Empire. Sebeos considered himself a continuator of the historiographical tradition. In his historical philosophy, he did not explicitly state the goals of history, likely because he considered this task resolved by his predecessors. He was the first in Armenian historiography to introduce apocalyptic tones. The historian interpreted the prophecy of Daniel about the four beasts within the context of contemporary political circumstances: these were the Greeks, Persians, people of the North, and Muslims, with Sebeos speaking of the imminent end of the world. Sebeos was also the first to focus on the fate of the Armenian diaspora. His text reflects an awareness of the role of the church and language as tools for preserving national identity.

A few decades earlier, apocalyptic ideas were present in the History of the Caucasian Albanians by Movses Kaghankatvatsi. The work was largely a compilation of earlier Armenian historians' works. In the 10th century, it was supplemented with new information and revised. According to Robert Thomson, the author saw the primary purpose of historiography as preserving the memory of the hierarchical order of local noble families.

Another historian who described the period of Arab oppression was Ghewond, active in the late 8th century. Ghewond's History of the Caliphs was written shortly after 790, beginning roughly where Sebeos' history ends and continuing to 788. The final part of the narrative was written by the author as an eyewitness to the events. The History of the Caliphs recounts the establishment of Arab rule in Armenia and the numerous uprisings of 703, 748, 762, and 774–775. The violent suppression of these rebellions and religious persecutions led Ghewond to advocate for Armenia's liberation from foreign oppression, in contrast to Sebeos' pessimistic stance. While Sebeos explained the establishment of Muslim hegemony over Jerusalem and much of the Christian East by the sinfulness of Christians and the righteousness and moderation of the Arabs, Ghewond based his position on an agreement between Catholicos Sahak III and the Arab governor Muhammad ibn Marwan to protect and respect Armenian subjects. God would allow Muslims to rule over Christian lands as long as they upheld this promise.

Around the same time, the History of Taron was written, dedicated to the eponymous region of historical Armenia. The ancient part of this complex work relies primarily on traditions, indicating the long-standing existence of pre-Christian customs and their remnants in Armenia. The work is written in a simple style and a language close to colloquial. It is conventionally divided into two parts. The first part is attributed to a monk named Zenob Glak, purportedly a contemporary of Gregory the Illuminator, while the second part is ascribed to John Mamikonean. The prevailing view is that both histories were composed in the late 8th century.

R. Thomson noted that the works of later writers did not achieve the classical status of Yeghishe or Movses Khorenatsi. Nevertheless, they are significant both as historical sources and as expressions of the Armenian cultural ethos.

=== Ecclesiastical Historiography ===
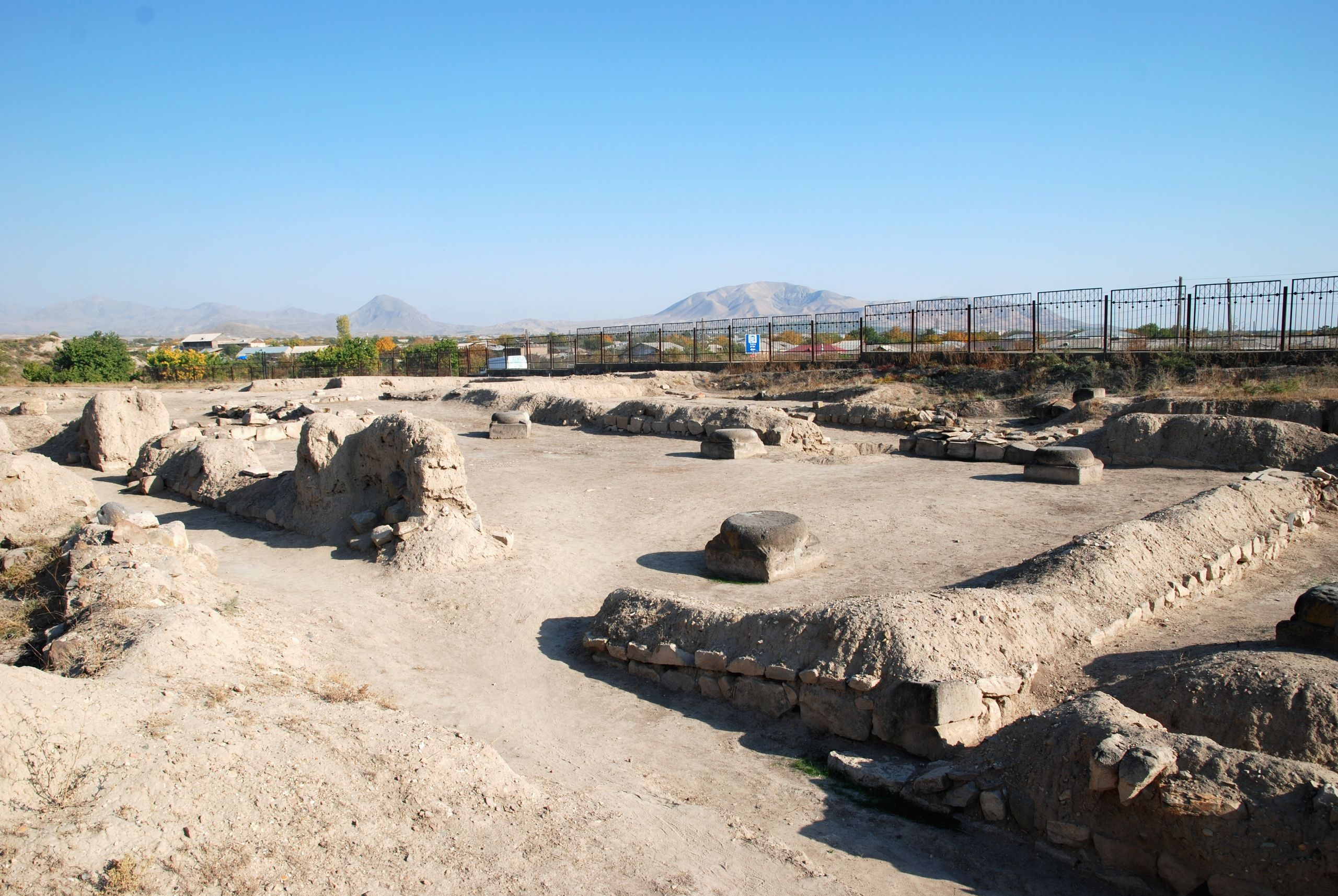
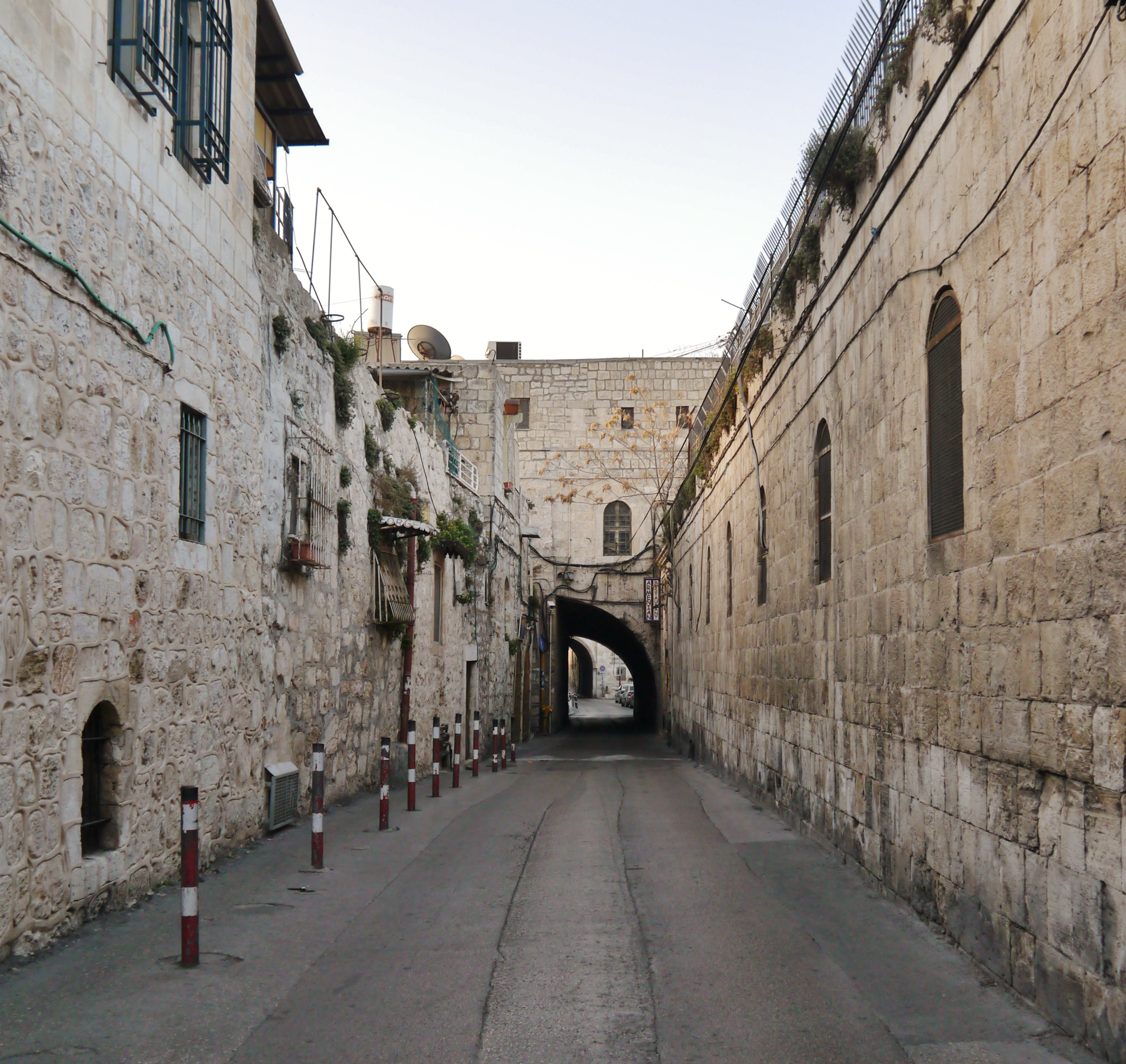
Ruins of the Catholicos' residence (484–931) in Dvin. Street in the Armenian Quarter of Jerusalem

With the exception of the 5th-century Refutations of False Teachings by Eznik of Kolb, early critical literature was directed against remnants of pre-Christian beliefs. Eznik addressed Greek philosophers, Mazdeans, and Marcionites. The situation changed after the Council of Chalcedon in 451, whose recognition of two natures in Christ was not accepted by the Armenians. The Christology of the Armenian Apostolic Church was developed in the 6th–7th centuries at the councils in Dvin and finalized in 726 at the Council of Manazkert.

Ideologically, the schism between the Armenian and Georgian churches in the early 7th century was decisive, after which the Armenian Church openly opposed Chalcedonism. Due to the predominant role of the church from the earliest period of Armenian literature, many authors focused on issues of doctrine, church governance, and combating heretics. Among such works is the History of the Council of Ephesus by Abraham Mamikoneits, an author from the second half of the 6th century.

Despite the schism, the Greeks long sought to spread Chalcedonism among the Armenians, but their efforts met resistance. The theme of this resistance is prominent in works from the 7th–8th centuries. However, Armenian attitudes toward the national church varied, with some aligning with Byzantium's doctrinal position. The 7th century is considered the peak of the Armenian-Chalcedonian Church, when three Chalcedonian catholicoi occupied the patriarchal throne.

The complex developments of ecclesiastical history are reflected in the collection of documents known as the Book of Letters. It completely omits the period between 618 and 703, when the non-Chalcedonian doctrine was significantly challenged, and contains only the theological views of Armenian Church leaders. The book compiles correspondence of Armenian ecclesiastical figures from the 5th to 13th centuries. Events of that time from a Chalcedonian perspective can be traced through a later Greek translation of a late 7th-century ecclesiastical history — Narratio de rebus Armeniae ("Narrative of Armenian Affairs"), the Armenian original of which was composed in Chalcedonian Armenian circles. The book covers roughly a three-hundred-year period from the 4th to 7th centuries. Andrews highlighted aspects of Armenian identity in the work: even those who renounced the national church remained true Armenians. Thomson noted that the creation of such texts demonstrates the Armenians' awareness of a long and distinctly national ecclesiastical tradition.

The opposing Miaphysite perspective is reflected in the two-part Anonymous Chronicle, written around the same time. Tim Greenwood attributed its authorship to Philon Tirakatsi and considered it a translation from Greek. In his view, the Anonymous Chronicle is a synoptic ecclesiastical history and a brief universal chronicle, closely related to the lost chronography of Annianus of Alexandria. Tara Andrews suggested that the author might have been Anania Shirakatsi. Supporting this view, Robert Thomson noted that from this time, chronicles—works presenting events in chronological sequence—became increasingly popular.

In the work On the Monasteries in the Holy City of Jerusalem, Anastas Vardapet listed seventy Armenian monasteries in Jerusalem. Scholars believe this work was written between the 6th and 8th centuries, though some consider the reported number of monasteries exaggerate. The presence of Armenian pilgrims and monks from the Caucasus in the Holy Land is confirmed by lapidary inscriptions in Armenian dated to the 5th–6th centuries.

=== Armenian Era of Chronology and Historiography creation ===
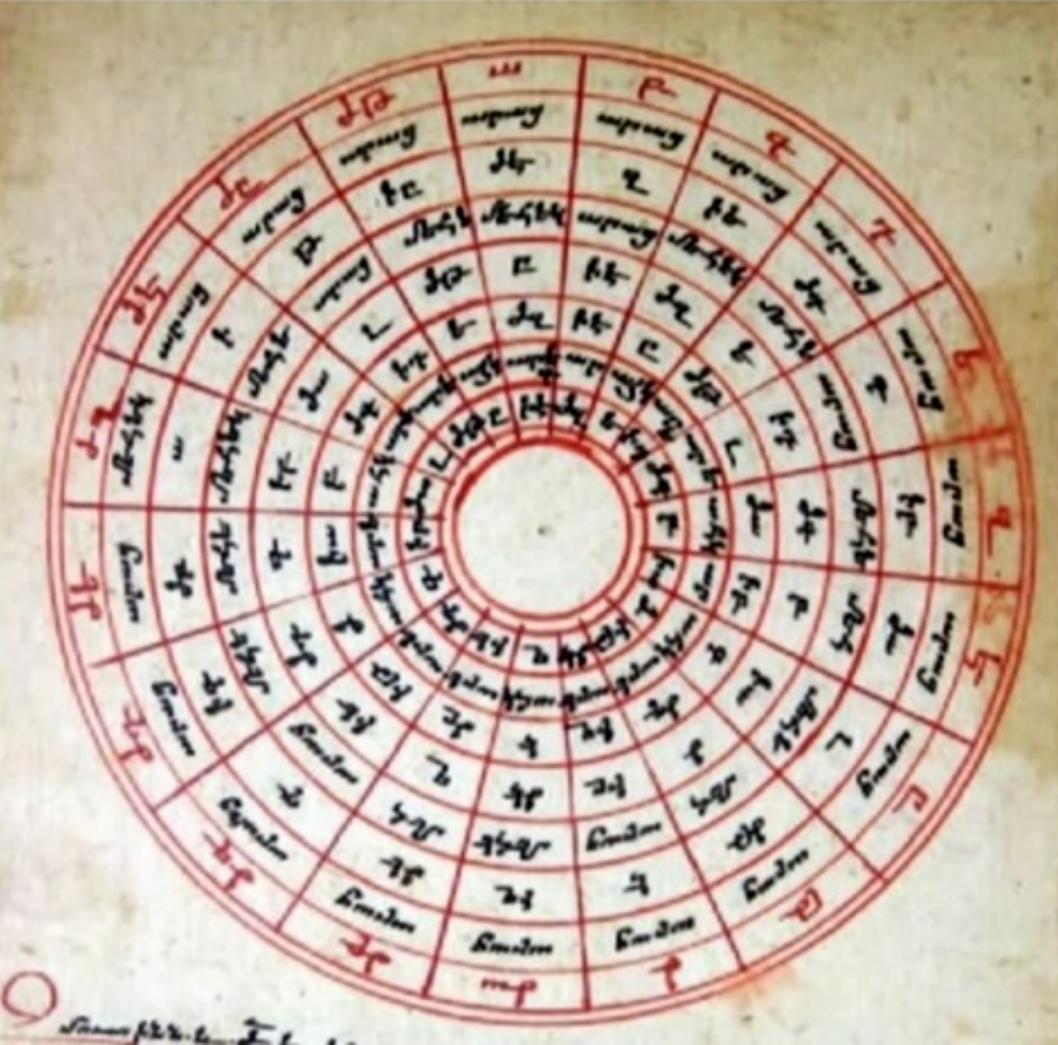
Page from a medieval calendar manuscript

Until the mid-6th century, historians structured their narratives by the reigns of kings, but after 552, they adopted the Armenian era of chronology. The calendar was adopted at the Council of Dvin, with the reckoning of time starting from July 11, 552. The issue of creating the Armenian era of chronology was discussed in 554 at the Second Council of Dvin, but it was officially adopted only in 584. Tim Greenwood of the University of St Andrews explained the creation of the Armenian calendar as an effort to demonstrate cultural equivalence: the Armenians sought to establish a "system of Armenian time" that would function alongside other global calendrical eras. Polish Armenologist Krzysztof Stopka noted that in the early 10th century, historian Hovhannes Draskhanakerttsi expressed pride in the existence of a national calendar.

In the late 11th century, Hovhannes Imastaser created the Armenian minor calendar, with its starting date in 1084. Compared to the primary calendar, it was used relatively sparingly. To an even lesser extent, Armenian historians and chroniclers used other calendrical systems, both local and foreign. Among those based on "from the creation of the world", the following four were primarily practiced:

1. Constantinopolitan era;
2. From Creation according to the Septuagint;
3. Alexandrian era;
4. The calendar of Anania Shirakatsi.

Additionally, sources mention chronologies based on Anno Domini, Indiction, Jubilee year, and the Olympiad.

== 10th–12th Centuries ==
=== Historiography of the Bagratid Era ===
In the 9th century, the weakening of the Caliphate forced the Arabs to adopt a more flexible policy toward Armenia. By the second half of the century, efforts to unite Armenia into a single state in the struggle against Arab domination began to take shape. The coronation of Prince of Princes Ashot I as king in 885 restored Armenian statehood, thereby averting the "immediate danger of physical annihilation". Medieval historians perceived this restoration of statehood as the Bagratids' revival of the ancient kingdom of Greater Armenia from the time of the Arsacids. As Tara L. Andrews wrote, during over four centuries without independence, the Armenians preserved their identity, "never fully becoming either West or East".

Robert Thomson noted that by the 10th century, the foundational historical works that shaped the Armenian understanding of their national destiny had already been written. In the chronicles of the early 10th century, narratives could still be framed around the dichotomy of the struggle between an impious foreign oppressor and the Armenian people, following the model of early Armenian authors. According to Tim Greenwood, however, the collapse of the Abbasid Caliphate led to a significant transformation of the political context. The threat to Armenian identity no longer came from the south or east in the form of a Zoroastrian or Islamic state. Instead, the threat emanated from the west, from dyophysite Byzantium. By the end of the 10th century, these changes necessitated a new approach to the past. Before delving into their main narratives, starting from the 10th century, historians typically provided a brief summary of earlier Armenian history. The narrative model from the creation of the world to the present was adopted from Movses Khorenatsi.

The new millennium began with the political and religious tensions familiar to Armenian authors. Monasteries, scattered across all regions and corners of the country, served as the primary repositories of historical memory and intellectual tradition. During the 10th–11th centuries, Armenian kings of the Bagratid dynasty patronized the development of written culture. As noted by the Encyclopædia Britannica, Armenian culture had not flourished so freely since the 5th century. Cyril Toumanoff characterized this period as the "Bagratid Renaissance". The robust historiographical tradition, supported during the "era of Bagratid rulers," led to the creation of new works of both regional and national scope. The restored Armenian Kingdom of Ani lasted about 150 years, during which the country experienced a cultural and economic flourishing. The results of economic development were evident in many areas, with cities expanding significantly. At the same time, the structure of Armenian society remained unchanged.

Among Armenian historians, the first place is held by the renowned Agathangelos, who narrates the marvelous miracles performed by St. Gregory, his martyrdom, and our knowledge of God; followed by the great Moses, equal to Eusebius, called the father of grammarians; then Yeghishe vardapet, the historian of Vardan and his companions, depicting the martyrdom of holy priests; next, the historian and rhetorician Lazarus of Parpi; Faustus the Byzantine; Bishop Sebeos, who wrote the history of [Emperor] Heraclius; the priest Ghewond, historian of the invasion of Armenia by the Tatars and the cruelties they inflicted; and finally, the Histories of Shapuh Bagratuni and the Armenian Catholicos, Lord John, [who lived] during the time of the first Bagratid kings.

— Stepanos Taronetsi, Universal History, 1004

In the late 9th century, Shapuh Bagratuni lived, whose work is now lost. A history published in the early 20th century, thought to be Shapuh Bagratuni's lost work, turned out to be a collection of legendary tales, primarily about the Artsruni dynasty rather than the Bagratuni, to which Shapuh belonged. Subsequently, Shapuh Bagratuni's book served as a primary source for some chroniclers on the rise of the Bagratid dynasty.

A monument of regional historiography was the History of the House of Artsruni by Tovma Artsruni, written between 903 and 908. Artsruni began with the origins of the Armenian people and concluded with events up to 904. While the book contains important information about the history of the entire country from ancient times, it particularly details events in southern Armenia (in the region of Vaspurakan) from the second half of the 9th to the early 10th century. Among his main sources were earlier Armenian historians, of whom he explicitly mentioned Khorenatsi, Koryun, and Yeghishe. From Yeghishe, Tovma borrowed historical models for describing the struggle against Muslims, and from Khorenatsi, an elegant style and principles of reliability, accuracy, and strict chronological order. Later, an anonymous author extended his narrative to 1121.

A historical work of national scope was the History of Armenia by Catholicos Hovhannes Draskhanakerttsi, a contemporary of Artsruni. The book is of great source value for studying relations with the Arabs, as Draskhanakerttsi was a direct participant in the events described in the final chapters of his chronicle. After assuming the office of catholicos in 898, he became a significant figure in the events. According to Thomson, Draskhanakertsi's history is unique in Armenian historiography because its author was personally involved in national and international processes, making him the first Armenian historian with direct political experience. Following the tradition established by Khorenatsi, Draskhanakertsi's narrative begins with ancient times, but the main part focuses on the period from the 890s to the 920s. In his political views, the historian firmly supported Armenia's independence from Byzantium and advocated for the preservation of a strong centralized state.

In the late 10th century, Ukhtanes wrote a history of Armenia. Little is known about this author, though he was likely the bishop of Sebastia during a period when Armenian colonies were expanding westward across the Euphrates. The first part of the book is a brief overview of history up to King Tiridates, the second part addresses the schism between the Armenian and Georgian churches in the early 7th century, and the final section, dedicated to Chalcedonian Armenians, is now lost. Ukhtanes staunchly defended the Christological views of the Armenian Church. His work is a valuable record of the reinterpretation of the Christian past, a theme that became one of the most significant in Armenian medieval historiography.

Another chronicle of national scope was the Universal History by Stepanos Taronetsi, completed in 1004 or early 1005. The work consists of three books. The Encyclopædia Britannica described it as a reliable and well-structured source. Taronetsi adhered to Movses Khorenatsi's principle of precise chronology and listed the previous Armenian historians on whom his work was based.Thomson considered the division of Stepanos' material into three parts —political history, religious history, and cultural history— an innovation in Armenian historiography. According to Greenwood, the novelty lay in the careful organization of the work's internal structure and the proportionality of its sections. Greenwood noted that in the Universal History, Stepanos Taronetsi sought to demonstrate Armenia's sovereignty and equality in its centuries-long relations with great powers. Stepanos highlighted the continuity of its historiographical tradition in its own language and script — remarkably resilient markers of Armenian identity. According to Theo van Lint, the author aimed to create a book that would guide future generations to live righteously until the end of times.

=== From the Fall of the Armenian Kingdom of Ani to the Coronation of Levon II ===
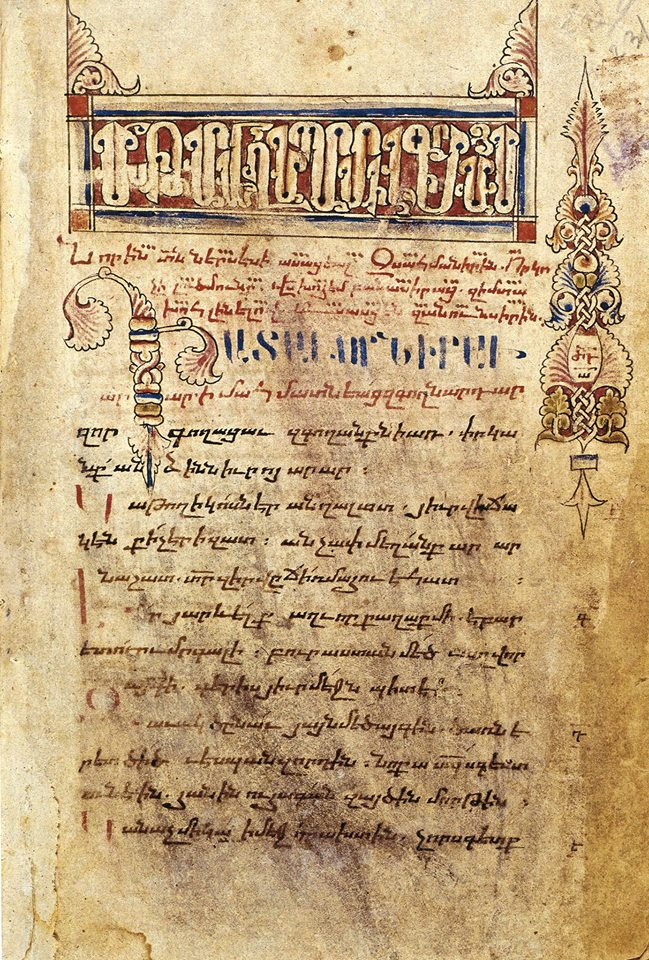
Page from the History by Mkhitar Anetsi, 1321 manuscript

In 1045, the Armenian Kingdom of Ani was conquered by the Byzantine Empire, after which Armenia faced an invasion by the Seljuks, who captured the former Armenian capital Ani in 1064. Neither the taxation by Byzantium nor the subsequent Seljuk invasions could entirely halt cultural and economic development. New historical works were created, and educational centers continued to operate at major monasteries such as Haghpat, Sanahin, Tatev, and others. The 11th century marked a turning point politically, but there was no disruption in traditional literary life. Nevertheless, the Seljuk conquest triggered a mass exodus of Armenians from Armenia to Georgia, Crimea, the North Caucasus, Cappadocia, Syria, and especially Cilicia. S. Peter Cowe wrote that these communities later played a role in enriching national culture. Starting in the 12th century, historiography also developed in the Armenian diaspora.

Another significant event affecting Armenian reality was the Crusades. By the time of the First Crusade, the Armenian historiographical tradition had existed for over six hundred years, during which the Armenians endured complex historical trials. They generally viewed the arrival of the Crusaders positively, in contrast to the calamity of the arrival of the Turks. With a long historical experience, chroniclers looked back to find connections with past events in Armenian history. In their vision of the future, they believed in the advent of an era of peace and prosperity. However, according to Robert Thomson, the Western cultural and social traditions brought by the Crusaders had little influence on historiography. The loss of statehood in the Armenian Highlands led to the disappearance of old aristocratic houses. Historiography, with some exceptions in Cilicia, increasingly became a church discipline. The mission of preserving historical memory was taken up by the catholicoi, who often commissioned monks to write specific works. Armenian historians frequently listed their predecessors, indicating their awareness of belonging to a shared literary process. Since the 12th century, the chronographic approach became widespread, and historiography experienced a new surge that lasted about two centuries.

Beginning with Aristakes Lastivertsi, the task of historians was to interpret the loss of Armenian statehood and the Seljuk conquest within the context of national historiography. His Narrative of the Calamities of the Armenian People was written between 1072 and 1079 as a direct continuation of Stepanos Taronetsi's history. The work describes significant events from 1001 to 1071: the fall of the Armenian Kingdom of Ani, the destruction of the city of Ani by the Seljuks, and their subsequent triumph. Aristakes held a moral view of history, considering the calamities that befell the Armenians as divine punishment for their sinfulness, enacted through other peoples. The historian was filled with pessimism, attempting to draw lessons from the Old Testament and Armenian history to preserve the traditional understanding of Armenian society.

Like Aristakes, the Armenian from Edessa Matteos Urhayetsi considered it his duty to record the sufferings endured by the Armenian people from the Turks and their Roman brothers. Unlike Aristakes, Urhayetsi returned to more traditional Armenian pre-deterministic models of historical philosophy. His book is a detailed chronicle of events from 951 to 1136. The final part of the Chronicle was likely written by the end of 1137. Among Urhayetsi's sources was the now almost entirely lost 11th-century Chronography by Hakob Sanahnetsi, who is believed to have used the archives of the Bagratids. Later, Grigor Erets continued this work, extending the narrative to 1162. Although, like Matteos, he maintained the style of a universal chronicle and generally provided dates, Grigor was less methodical. He depicted the Armenians as a threatened people, believing that the Turks and Byzantines sometimes coordinated their military actions against them. Andrews called this work the first Armenian history written in the diaspora after the fall of the Armenian Kingdom.

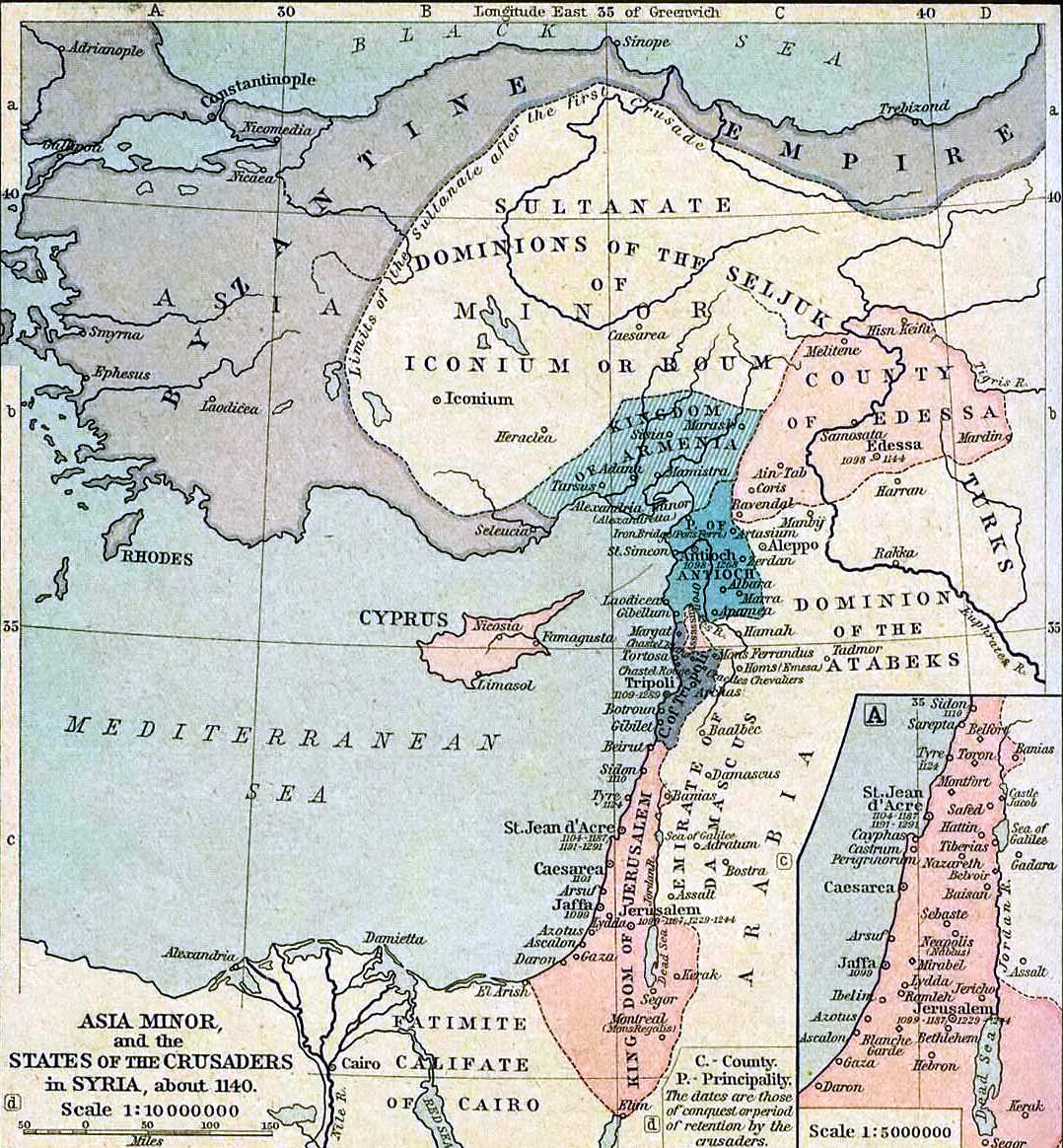
Cilician Armenia and its neighbors around 1140

Somewhat later, the Chronology by Samuel Anetsi became another major historiographical endeavor of the time. It consists of two parts, before and after the birth of Christ, and narrates history up to 1182. The work was later supplemented. Like Eusebius's Chronicle, it is written in parallel columns and is entirely chronological. To reconcile divergent dates from sources, he employed a comparative method. At the beginning of the book, Anetsi listed some preceding Armenian historians, including Agathangelos, Khorenatsi, Yeghishe, Parpetsi, Sebeos, Ghewond, Shapuh, Draskhanakerttsi, and Asoghik.

Another historian from Ani, Mkhitar Anetsi, wrote his History around 1193, likely at the request of the abbot of the Arich monastery. Only part of the book survives. Anetsi used Armenian and Syriac sources from the previous period. In the book, he provided a list of Armenian historians, concluding with Samuel Anetsi. The work covers history from the time of King Paruyr Skayordi to the Crusades. One chapter is devoted to theoretical questions of the historical genre, listing several valuable principles for developing historiographical methods. According to Anetsi, history is a collection of events that actually occurred, a science of understanding the past and present, and a means of forecasting the future. He identified six main elements of history: person, subject, place, time, method, and cause. To write history, one should study ancient and modern historical works, possess logical thinking, employ methods of accurate expression, know ancient languages, and approach sources cautiously. A century later, Stepanos Orbelian described this work as "beautiful". Anetsi is also sometimes credited with a short historical work, History of the City of Ani.

From the 12th century, the earliest example of travel notes in Armenian literature is known: the Names of Indian and Persian Cities by an anonymous author. The compiler, as evident from the text, personally visited India and was well acquainted with the country. Modern scholars also classify this work as part of Armenian historiographical literature.

== XIII–XVI Centuries ==
At the end of the 12th and beginning of the 13th century, significant areas of Armenian lands came under the political control of the Kingdom of Georgia, when joint Armenian-Georgian forces liberated northeastern Armenia, where the vassal Zakarian Principality was established. However, in 1236, the Mongol conquest of Armenia began, significantly altering the political landscape. Another pivotal event was the coronation of Levon II as king of the Cilician Armenian Kingdom in 1198. He was recognized as a legitimate king by Emperor Henry VI of the Holy Roman Empire, Pope Celestine III, and the Byzantine Emperor. From then on, Cilicia became another center for the development of Armenian literature and science.

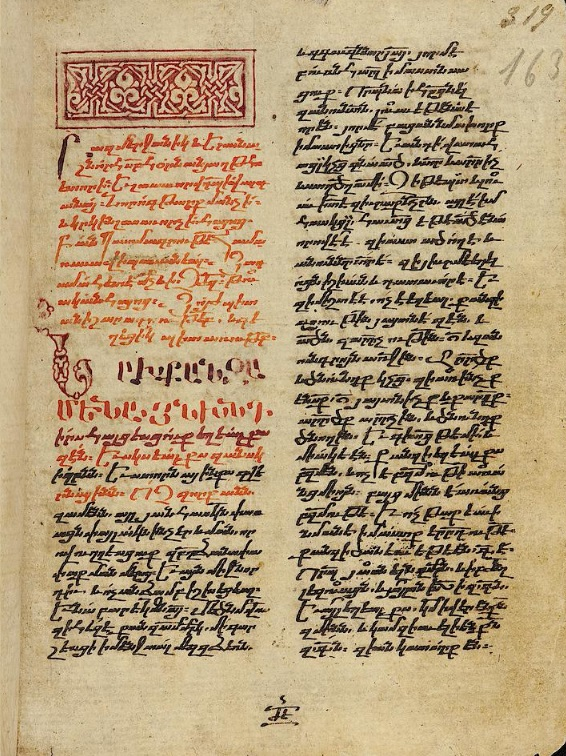
Page from the "Universal History" by Vardan Areveltsi, manuscript of 1432

Due to their geographical position, Armenians found themselves on the front line of all western Mongol wars, at various historical moments becoming either victims or allies of the conquerors. According to George Lane, "their chronicles shift from cursing these half-humans from hell to praising the military valor, moral integrity, and impartial justice of the Tatars". Dashdondog emphasized the importance of understanding the mindset of medieval Armenians writing during this period. According to Lane, the Armenian case has a certain specificity, significantly distinguishing them from other Christian peoples in the region. Religious distinctiveness, isolation, and constant physical threats influenced their historiography, particularly their interpretation of the configurations of forces around them. At the same time, the long struggle against foreign conquerors in previous eras provided Armenians with historiographical constructs, which they adapted to new circumstances. The works of historians of this era cover a deeper and more comprehensive range of historical issues, adopting a clearer and more readable method of presenting material. The founder of this new school of Armenian historiography is considered to be Vanakan Vardapet. Although his History has not survived, it had a significant influence on Kirakos Gandzaketsi, Vardan Areveltsi, and Grigor Aknertsi. In the 13th century, Armenian historiography experienced a new development: a whole constellation of prominent historians emerged; in the words of Bayarsaikhan Dashdondog, their books "represent excellent examples of world medieval historiography".

Among the most important Armenian historians of the 13th century is Kirakos Gandzaketsi, a student of Vanakan Vardapet. Following the literary model of Khorenatsi, Kirakos sought to begin with the origins of national history. His History of Armenia covers a thousand years of political, social, economic, religious, and cultural history from the time of Christianization to the era of the author's life. The book, written between 1241 and 1265, consists of a preface and 65 chapters. In the second section of the work, Kirakos wrote about contemporary events, preserving important evidence of the establishment of Mongol dominance in the Near East and their relations with Muslim states, including the Mamluks and Seljuks. The central theme of Kirakos's history is the development of Armenian-Mongol relations. Referring to the medieval Prophecy of Patriarch Nerses, Kirakos claimed that the Mongol conquest of Armenia was a harbinger of the Antichrist. He himself, along with his teacher, was in Mongol captivity throughout the summer of 1236. Kirakos provides a list of Armenian historians who preceded him.

"The historiographers of the Armenian people have also left many works. For example, the marvelous and insightful Agathangelos (which translates to messenger of good), who, by order of the mighty and brave King Trdat, recounted the circumstances and events that took place among the Armenians through the Christian confessor Saint Gregory Partev, about the actions of signs and inventions, about miracles, about the reasons for the enlightenment of our Armenian country, and completed [his work] with a beautiful and radiant narrative. Following him, the most learned and wise among other [historians], the holy man of God Movses Khorenatsi presented the history of Armenia in the most erudite and praiseworthy style. Beginning with a brief narrative full of expansive thoughts about the first man, [he recounts] the events, deeds, and actions of many nations, continuing up to the days of Trdat and Saint Gregory, and from there to the death of the Armenian patriarch Saint Sahak and the lament for our Armenian country, where he concludes. After him, the holy Yeghishe narrates the feat of Saint Sahak’s grandson, Vardan, and his companions, who, trusting in Christ, sacrificed themselves and were crowned by Christ; he sings of the valiant death of the holy Joseph and his companions, the unity of the Armenian nakharars trusting in Christ in their voluntary imprisonment by the [Persian] king, the sufferings and martyrdom of the holy Khoren and Abraham, about which this marvelous man so reliably narrates. Then the eloquent Lazar Parpetsi begins from the time of Saint Sahak and narrates in the same spirit. And after him, Faustos Buzand, who narrates what happened between our Armenian country and the Persians and because of them with us. And the narrative about Heraclius by Bishop Sebeos. And the ‘History’ of the marvelous man Koryun. And Khosrov. And the ‘History’ of the priest Ghevond about what Mohammed and his successors did to all countries, and especially to our Armenian people. And Vardapet Tovma Artsruni, historiographer of the Artsruni house. And Shapuh Bagratuni. And the lord Hovhannes Draskhanakerttsi, Catholicos of Armenia. And Movses Kaghankatvatsi, historiographer of Aghvank. And Bishop Urfin Ukhtanes, who described the separation of Georgians from Armenians through Kyurion. And Vardapet Stepanos Taronetsi, nicknamed Asoghik. And Vardapet Aristakes Lastivertsi, nicknamed Lastivertsi. And the monastic priest Matenos Urhayetsi. And Samuel Anetsi, priest of the Ani Cathedral. And then the insightful and wise Vardapet, nicknamed Vanakan".

— Kirakos Gandzaketsi, History of Armenia, 1241

Around the same time, as Kirakos, his classmate Vardan Areveltsi wrote the Universal History, extending the narrative to 1267. According to Thomson, Vardan used the history of Stepanos Taronetsi as a literary model. Thomson believed that Vardan's method consisted of attempting to reconcile various assessments of Armenia's past. The primary value of the work lies in its description of Armenia's situation in the 13th century.

The third student of Vanakan Vardapet was Grigor Aknertsi, who, in his work History of the Nation of Archers, described events related to Armenians from the era of Genghis Khan to 1273. The work was written in 1273 in the desert of Akner in the Cilician Armenian Kingdom. Unlike traditional Armenian historiography, this book is not a universal history. It is believed that much of the information was derived from the lost work of his teacher.

From Eastern Armenia came Stepanos Bishop, author of a Chronicle covering the period from 1193 to 1290. The work is a direct continuation of the Selection from Historical Books by Samuel Anetsi. Expressing astonishment at the rapid and sudden conquest of the country, Stepanos provided descriptions that help better understand the Armenian reaction to the Mongol invasion. It was previously erroneously attributed to Stepanos Orbelian.

The Metropolitan of Syunik, Stepanos Orbelian, authored the History of the Province of Sisakan, consisting of 73 chapters, completed in 1299. Ordained as a bishop by the Cilician Catholicos Constantine II the Woolmaker, he became the de facto spiritual leader of Eastern Armenia. This work is a monument of regional Armenian historiography dedicated to the history of the Syunik province, while the narrative is set against the backdrop of the history of all of Armenia and its neighbors. Speaking of the purpose of his work, Stepanos emphasized his intention to save the history of his native province from oblivion. The book is notable for its extensive use of archival documentation and lapidary inscriptions.

Partially in Syunik and partially in Ayrarat, the monastic activities of Mkhitar Ayrivanetsi took place. In the first half of the 14th century, he completed the Chronography, a concise history of Armenia from the creation of the world to 1328. Stephen Rapp suggested dividing the text into three parts: a description of the creation of the world, the presentation of various biblical figures, and a historical chronicle. In line with the tradition established in medieval Armenian historiography, Ayrivanetsi referenced a wide range of Armenian authors, including Agathangelos, Khorenatsi, Ukhtanes, Matenos Urhayetsi, Samuel Anetsi, Vardan Areveltsi, and Kirakos Gandzaketsi. He also used the Kartlis Tskhovreba, likely its Armenian translation.

Another center of Armenian historiography was the Cilician Armenian Kingdom. In the 13th century, an anonymous author from Sebastia, known in modern historiography as Sebastatsi, lived. His chronicle provides a complete description of the Mongol conquest of Armenia and the region. It covers the period from the 1st century AD to 1220, is interrupted from 1221 to 1254 due to lost pages, and then continues to 1300. The final part of the chronicle is original, while information up to the 1260s is drawn from the works of Matenos Urhayetsi, Vardan Areveltsi, and Kirakos Gandzaketsi.

The Chronicle of the brother of King Hetum I of Cilicia and commander-in-chief Smbat Sparapet covers the period between 951 and 1272. This work is one of the primary sources on the Cilician Armenian Kingdom, as well as a valuable source on Armenian relations with the Crusaders and Mongols, and Armenian-Byzantine, Armenian-Persian, and Armenian-Arab relations. Narrating the fall of the Armenian kingdom in 1045, he considered the event a fulfillment of the Prophecy of Patriarch Nerses. An anonymous author continued it until 1331.

The lord of Korykos, Hetum Patmich, in 1307, at the request of Pope Clement V, wrote the Flower of Histories of the East. According to David Bundy and Peter Jackson, this work represents early 14th-century Armenian propaganda aimed at maintaining Latin-Mongol-Armenian relations and reflecting the involvement of the Armenian elite in justifying their alliance with the Mongols. The work is unique in Armenian historiography as it was written not in Armenian but in French. It was translated into Latin and Spanish in the 14th century and into English in the 16th century.

Historical works known as minor chronicles have also survived. One of the earliest such authors was an Anonymous from the first half of the 13th century. His chronicle survives under the name of Hovhannes Imastaser in one of the lists of the latter's calendrical works. The text, which has reached us only partially, covers the period from the mid-6th century to 1236—the capture of the former Armenian capital Ani by the Mongols. In 1225, a short Chronicle by Hovhannes Avagter was written, starting from the year 1 and ending in 1032. It provides dates of the reigns of Roman and Byzantine emperors, Persian and Armenian kings, dates of the occupancy of the Armenian Catholicos' throne, and other brief information. A Chronicle is attributed to King Hetum II of Cilician Armenia, written in 1296. The work was continued by various anonymous authors and extended to 1351.

One of the last echoes of the previous period of flourishing Armenian historiography was the work of the early 15th-century historian Tovma Metsopetsi. Metsopetsi dedicated his History of Timur and His Successors to the wars and invasions of Timur and Shahrukh, as well as the rulers of Kara Koyunlu between 1386 and 1440. It contains valuable data related to the political history of Transcaucasia. Metsopetsi also wrote the Ishkarakan — a note on the return of the Armenian patriarchal throne from Sis to Etchmiadzin, providing detailed information about the ecclesiastical history of the 14th–15th centuries.

=== Era of Decline. Minor Chronicles ===
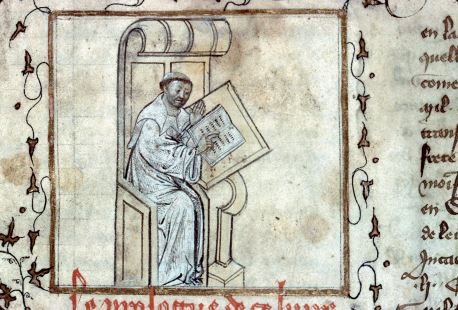
Portrait of historian Hetum Patmich, 14th century

In the 14th century, Armenian historiography entered a period of decline, linked to the Mamluk invasion of Cilicia and Timur's invasion of Armenia. With the destruction of the Cilician Armenian Kingdom in 1375, independent Armenian statehood disappeared from the political map for the next five and a half centuries. Between 1386 and 1403, the Central Asian conqueror Timur carried out three devastating invasions of Armenia. According to Košťálová, the image of "terrible Timur" was so strong that it influenced some chroniclers describing events of the 16th–17th centuries. In 1410, the rule of the Kara Koyunlu was established in Armenia, followed by the Aq Qoyunlu in 1468, and in the 16th century, Armenia was divided between the Safavid Empire and the Ottoman Empire.

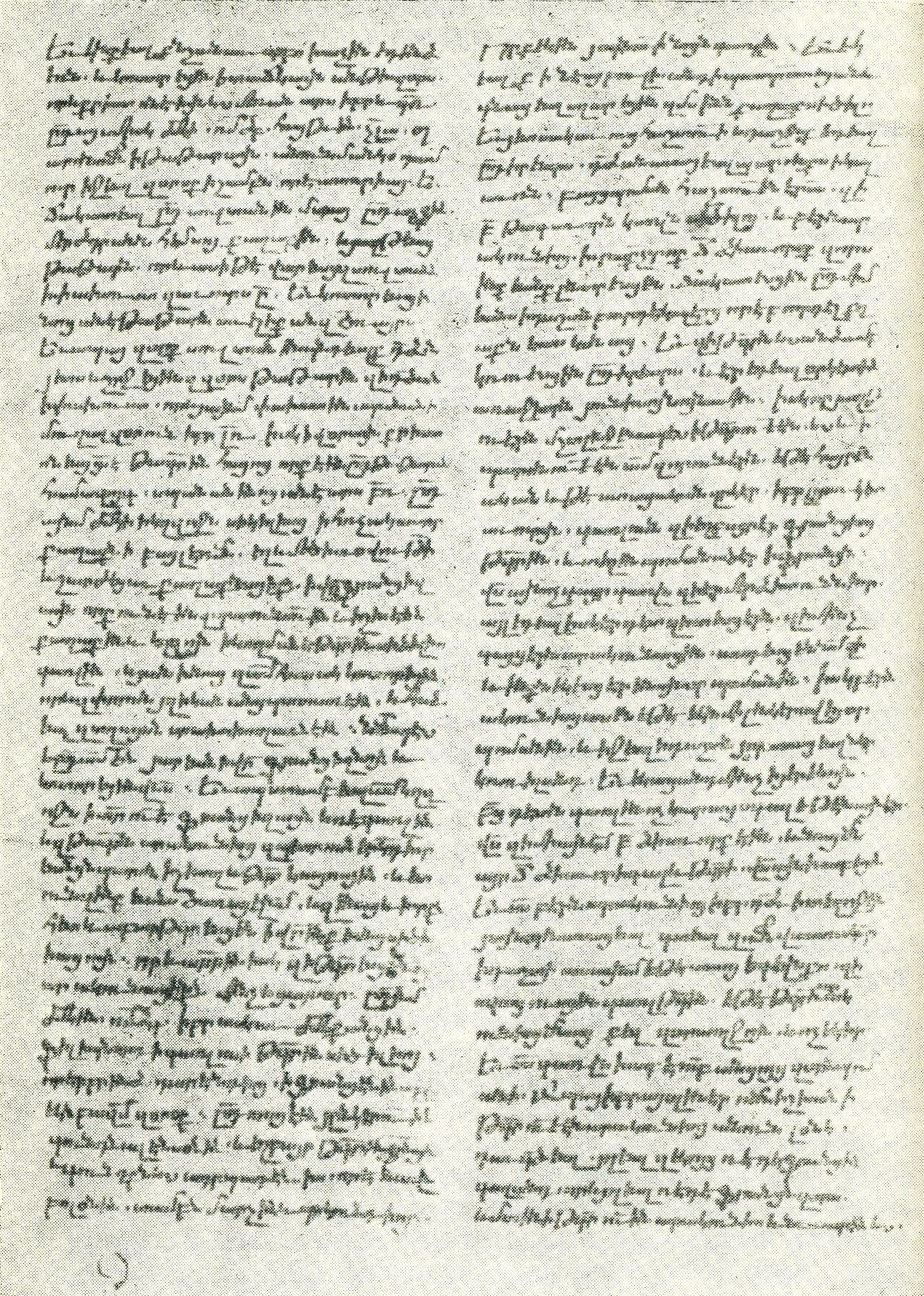
Page from the "Chronology" of Nerses Palianents (Matenadaran, manuscript No. 2037)

The decline of historiography lasted until the 1630s–1640s. During this period, no significant historical works were created. According to V. Hakobyan, in such an unstable political situation, "no historian could emerge who would be able to identify the causal connection and historical regularity of the events, rise above their time, and interpret historical phenomena in their inseparable unity". Except for Tovma Metsopetsi's History of Timur and His Successors, the historical events of this period have reached us mainly through minor chronicles and memorial records in manuscripts. Many memorial records were written in the form of brief chronicles. Minor chronicles were mostly tied to contemporary events and more localized in geographical scope.

Medieval historiographers considered kings and princes the makers of history, whose activities were merely a reflection of God's will. However, by this time, only the memory remained of the great feudal houses or kings of the Arshakids, Bagratids, or Rubenids. The fate of the Armenian people was in the hands of Tatar emirs, Turkmen mirzas, Ottoman pashas, and Persian khans. Amid arbitrary raids, tyranny, destruction, and plunder, the spiritual life of Armenians, their ethnic and religious sentiments, was also suppressed, and the people were expelled from their homeland. In addition to political history, minor chronicles contain data on the tax policies of the time, the internal life of the people, various aspects of daily life, and social issues. They provide detailed information on toponymy and the lives of public, political, and ecclesiastical figures. Among the authors of such works from the 14th–16th centuries were Sargis Pitsak Ssetsi (14th century), Anonymous (14th century), Kirakos Banaser (15th century), anonymous authors of the 15th–16th centuries who wrote the early parts of the chronicle of Hakob Hisusi, Movses Artsketsi (15th century), Hovhannisik Tsaretsi (16th century), Barseg Arjishetsi (16th century), Hovhannes Arjishetsi (16th century), Anonymous (16th century), Anonymous Sebastatsi (16th century), and others. The minor chronicles and memorial records of this period reflect the mournful spirit of the time.

Several chronicles were written in the diaspora. Between 1348 and 1351, in Avignon in France, Nerses Palianents completed a translation of the Chronicle by Martin of Opava. Considering Armenian history as part of universal history, Palianents inserted chronological data concerning Armenian history and added lists of Armenian kings, princes, and catholicoi at the end. His information about the state of the Cilician Armenian Kingdom is particularly valuable. Also attributable to diaspora historiography is Abraham Ankyuratsi, author of the Chronicle of Armenian History. David Merdintsi was a direct witness to many events described in his chronicle from 1450 to 1457. A century later, an anonymous author from Wallachia described the persecution of Armenians by Ștefan VI Rareș in 1551. The chronicle of Andreas Yevdokatsi, a chronicler from Yevdokia, consisting of nine manuscript pages, begins with the fall of Constantinople and ends in 1590.

=== Historical Lament. Poetic Chronicles ===
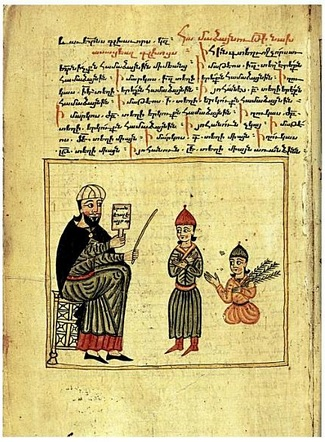
Grigor Khlatetsi, author of "Recollections of Calamities," manuscript of 1419

Researchers also consider the genre of historical lament within the framework of Armenian historical literature, sometimes referring to these works as poetic chronicles․ Laments (voghb) were widespread in Armenian historical works, though they became a significant feature in later literature. According to Petra Košťálová, the entire medieval Armenian historical and literary discourse is deeply imbued with this genre. According to Košťálová, laments represented a general approach to Armenian history, in which all catastrophes were explained as God's displeasure with sinners. This concept was adhered to, for example, by Karapet Baghishetsi in the "Lament on the Invasions of Shah Ismail", as well as by Azaria Sasnetsi and Hakob Tokhatsi.

One of the earliest laments of the later period was the poetic history Recollections of Calamities by Grigor Khlatetsi, which described Timur's invasions and the wars of Turkoman tribes. Abraham Ankyuratsi, author of the poetic chronicle Lament on the Fall of Constantinople, was personally present in the city during its siege and fall. Some laments were dedicated to the theme of exile and mass emigration. For instance, Minas Tokhatsi, who emigrated to the Principality of Moldavia in 1540, in his Lament for the Armenians of the Land of Olah described the persecution of Armenians on religious and economic grounds in 1551–1552 by the ruler Ștefan VI Rareș. Similarly, Hovhannes Makvetsi, in the Lament for the Armenian Land, described the forced deportation from Transcaucasian Armenia to Iran in 1604.

Laments about the fall of Armenian kingdoms or principalities were a distinctive literary genre and often included optimistic prophecies foretelling the possible restoration of statehood. For example, the past greatness of Armenia was mourned by Simeon Aparantsi in the Lament for the Throne of King Trdat in 1594. In it, the author reveals the idea of restoring an independent Armenian state. Michael E. Stone characterized his poetic narratives as written in a "strongly patriotic spirit". Parallel to the historiography of "Divine punishment" for sins, they developed the idea of salvation, often seen as heralded by political liberation. This literary structure was vividly expressed in the works of 12th-century authors Nerses Shnorhali and Grigor Tgha. Thus, according to Theo van Lint, the authors of laments followed the philosophy of history of Armenian classics.

Apocalyptic ideas and hopes for assistance from the West (beginning with the era of the Crusades) persisted in Armenian literature for a long time. They are reflected, for example, in various elegies dedicated to the fall of Constantinople in 1453. Robert Thomson cited Arakel Bitlisetsi as an example, who anticipated the liberation of Istanbul and Jerusalem by the Franks, after which the victorious Franks, together with the descendants of Armenian soldiers who remained in Rome after King Trdat I's visit in the 1st century AD, would head to Armenia for the same purpose. The idea of the liberation of the Armenian people with the help of the Franks is also reflected in the poetic chronicle Lament for the Capital City of Istanbul by Arakel Baghishetsi: "Deliver the Armenians from the sufferings inflicted upon us by impious nations. Lord, have mercy!" wrote Baghishetsi.

== XVII–XVIII Centuries ==
=== New Rise of Historiography ===
According to the Encyclopædia Britannica, the 17th century saw signs of overcoming the cultural decline of previous centuries, associated with the Mamluk invasion of 1375 and Timur's invasion of 1386, while the subsequent 18th century became a time of intellectual revival. A heightened interest in the past was a result of the rise of national identity and a sense of unity, particularly among the enlightened class. Authors primarily focused on contemporary events, likely due to their temporal distance from earlier periods of history. Aware of the dispersion of the Armenian people worldwide and the overwhelming power of their adversaries, historians wrote about the need to respond appropriately to the challenges of the new era. The new era gave rise to several innovations in the principles and methods of historiography: psychologism developed, greater attention was paid to describing various aspects of the people's life and customs, and the language of the works became closer to the vernacular. Historians Grigor Daranaghetsi, Arakel Davrizhetsi, Zakaria Kanakertsi, Zakaria Aguletsi, Abraham Kretatsi, Khachatur Jughayetsi, Simeon Yerevantsi, Yeremia Tschelebi Kömürdjian, Stepanos Shaumyan, Esayi Hasan-Jalalyan, and Abraham Yerevantsi were bearers of progressive views of their time, providing detailed accounts of diaspora life, traditions, and consistently developing ideas of enlightenment, freedom, and political and cultural revival. Historiography was one of the expressions of the Armenian national liberation movement and played a significant role in shaping its ideas. The influence of these ideas is evident, for example, in the book published in 1773, New Notebook Called Exhortation by Indian Armenian Movses Baghramian, an advocate for liberation from Turkish-Persian oppression. In the works of Yesai Hasan-Jalalyan, Stepanos Shaumyan, and Simeon Yerevantsi, a pro-Russian political orientation emerges, along with the idea of an Armenian-Georgian military alliance. These works reflected the complex socio-political situation of the era: Persian-Ottoman wars, the policy of "scorched earth," the associated forced deportation of Armenians in 1604, epidemics, famine, and more. They are also valuable for cross-referencing historical monuments created in the previous period. Some historians lived in the Ottoman Empire, while others were subjects of the Safavid Empire. According to Baki Tezcan, "the ease with which they could operate in both empires is truly remarkable".

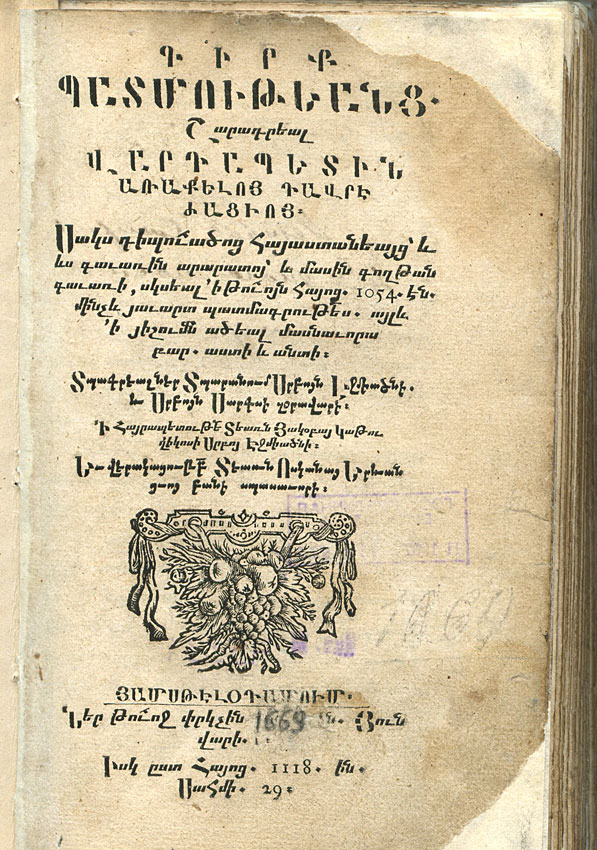
Title page of the first and lifetime edition of the "Book of Histories" by Arakel Davrizhetsi, Amsterdam, 1669

The first major Armenian historian of the 17th century was Grigor Daranaghetsi. Settling in Istanbul at the beginning of the century, he became a prominent figure in the competition for the patriarchal throne. Due to his obligations to the Armenian community, Grigor traveled to many corners of the Ottoman Empire. His "Chronography," written between 1634 and 1640, is a rich source of information on the political and ecclesiastical history of Armenia and the Armenian communities of Constantinople, Jerusalem, and Rhodes. The "Chronography" consists of two parts: the first covers the period from 1018 to 1539 and contains a brief history of Armenia, while the second, more valuable part, describes events during the author's lifetime. In it, Daranaghetsi acts as an eyewitness and sometimes a direct participant in the events. Throughout the text, the historian's national identity is vividly evident.

At the same time, among the historical works of the 17th century, the most significant is considered the Book of Histories by Arakel Davrizhetsi. Written at the request of Catholicos Philippos Ier d'Aghbak, it consists of 56 chapters and was completed in 1662. The Book of Histories is a reliable source on the history of the entire region from 1602 to 1662. Arakel was an eyewitness to many of the events he described, reporting on the situation of Armenians between the Ottoman and Safavid Empires, the life of the Istanbul community, the consequences of the adoption of Catholicism by Polish Armenians, the expulsion to Persia by Shah Abbas, and other details. Arakel paid special attention to episodes of the liberation struggle. The "Book of Histories" is imbued with patriotism, and in it, Davrizhetsi demonstrated uncompromising loyalty to the Armenian Church. He was the first Armenian historian whose book was printed during his lifetime.

A contemporary of Arakel Davrizhetsi was David Baghishetsi, author of a chronicle in two parts. The first part narrates the history of the Armenian people from ancient times to 1662. The second part is a brief universal history from ancient times to the fall of Constantinople to the Turks in 1453. In compiling the chronicle, Baghishetsi used a large number of sources, particularly the works of ancient Greek and Armenian historians.

Another 17th-century author was Hakob Karnettsi. His two main works are the "History of the Church of Surp Astvatsatsin in Karin" and the "Description of Upper Armenia." The latter is a comprehensive topographic and geographical study of 23 regions of the vast province of Upper Armenia, containing information on the population, customs, and socio-economic life of each region. In his "Chronology," Karnettsi listed important events that occurred in Armenia from 1482 to 1672. He wrote in a lively and vivid style in tolerable Classical Armenian, drawing on some works from the Golden Age.

A prominent historian of the late 17th century was Zakaria Kanakertsi, a native of the village of Kanaker near Yerevan and a student of Hovhannavank. His "History," written in three parts under some influence from Arakel Davrizhetsi, begins with the establishment of the Arshakid dynasty in Armenia and ends in 1699. The first book primarily contains ethnographic material. The second book provides information on the political, social, and religious life of Armenia and neighboring countries in the 17th century. The third book is dedicated to the history of Hovhannavank. Zakaria wrote in a simple yet elegant style, detailing aspects of common people's lives, which are almost absent in medieval sources. His information about the 17th century is particularly valuable, as from chapter 28 of the first book, he wrote as a contemporary and eyewitness to the events described. His main shortcoming is a weak critical-analytical approach and poor systematization.

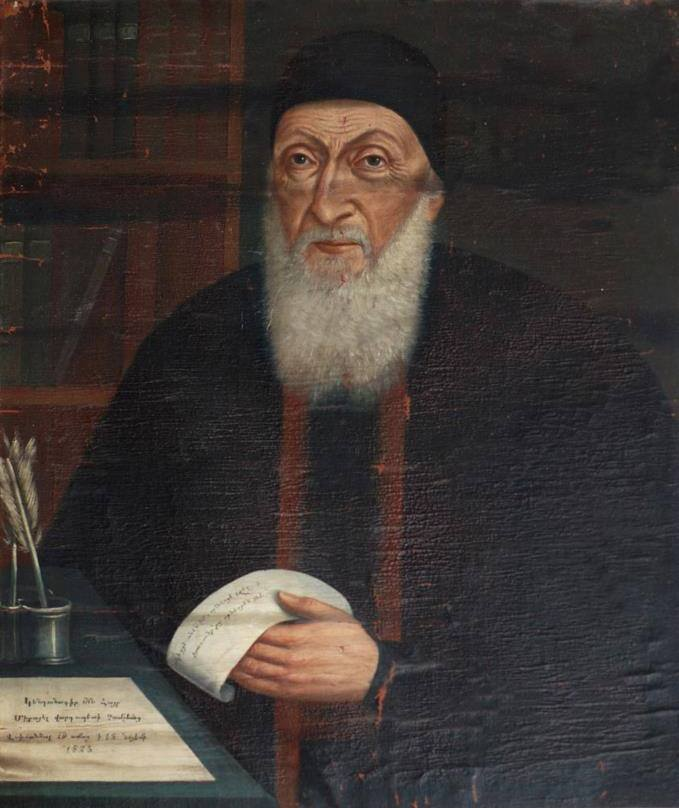
Portrait of Mikayel Chamchian

One of the first historians of the 18th century was Avetik Baghdasaryan. Between 1701 and 1712, based on the works of Armenian and foreign historians, he compiled the chronicle "Akhusakapatmagir." The book begins with the creation of the world and ends with the appointment of Astvatsatur Hamadantsi as Armenian Catholicos. The later parts of the chronicle, dedicated to the political events of Armenia in the 16th–17th centuries, hold scientific value.

His contemporary was Esayi Hasan-Jalalyan, Catholicos of the Aghvank Catholicosate of the Armenian Apostolic Church, author of a work on the history of Nagorno-Karabakh titled "A Brief History of the Country of Aghvank." Hasan-Jalalyan advocated for Armenian-Georgian military cooperation and joint struggle against foreign oppression.

In the work of Abraham Yerevantsi, "History of the Wars of 1721–1736," the events from the Afghan invasion of Persia to the coronation of Nader Shah in Mughan and details of the Turco-Persian war are described. The second chapter, an eyewitness account of the heroic resistance of Yerevan's residents against Ottoman invaders in 1724, holds particular significance, containing important information about the city itself. The detailed description of military preparations and operations shows that Yerevantsi had a clear understanding of the art of warfare, and his brilliant style attests to the author's good education.

Abraham Kretatsi, an Armenian from Crete, elected Catholicos in 1734, narrates in his "History" the final years of the Safavids, the election of Nader Shah as ruler of Persia in 1736, and his victories over the Ottomans, as well as the political and economic life of Armenia and neighboring countries during this period. K. Bardakjian considered his history largely memoir-like. In another work dedicated to the history of the medieval Armenian capital Ani, Kretatsi explained its destruction as divine wrath.

In Yerevan lived the chronicler Simeon I of Yerevan, author of the work "Jamb." In 25 chapters, he compiled a historical retrospective of the Armenian Church. The author provides lists of dioceses, their jurisdictions, and financial statuses, lists of decrees and permits issued by Persian and Turkish authorities, and the history of 21 monasteries located in the Erivan Khanate. Through this work, he sought to strengthen the central authority, independence, and distinctiveness of the Armenian Church. He opposed the ideas of the Indian Armenian community for armed liberation of Armenia.

The completion of the classical period and the beginning of a new stage in the development of Armenian historiography was marked by the "History of Armenia" by Mikayel Chamchian. The book was published in three volumes in Venice between 1784 and 1786. According to K. Bardakjian: "No Armenian historian since Movses Khorenatsi dared to undertake what Chamchyan accomplished." His narrative begins with the creation of the world and extends to 1784. Chamchyan somewhat idealized Armenia's past.

Authors of minor chronicles of the 17th–18th centuries include: Anonymous Livornatsi (17th century), Anonymous Vanetsi (17th century), three other anonymous authors (17th century), Grigor Varagetsi (17th century), Vardan Baghishetsi (17th century), Amiras Yerznkatsi (17th century), the chronicle edited by Grigor Kamakhetsi (17th century), Anonymous Vanetsi (17th–18th centuries), Isaac Vardapet (18th century), Baghdasar Dpir (18th century), Martiros di Arakel (18th century), Hakob Tivriktsi (18th century), Martiros Khalifa (18th century), Astvatsatur, Ovan, and Arakel Aknertsi (18th century), Grigor and Urah Karintsi (18th century), Barseg Grich and Melik Keamal (18th century), Anonymous Vanetsi (18th century), Anonymous (18th century), and others.

=== Historiography in the Diaspora ===
Possessing considerable trading skills, Armenians, as a religious minority, lived both in the territories of Near Eastern powers and in the Polish-Lithuanian Commonwealth, the Habsburg Empire, and other countries. It is generally accepted that they made a significant contribution to the development of one of the largest trading networks of the Early Modern period. According to Košťálová, they created a global trading network stretching from Western Europe to the Far East. Armenian communities began to flourish in the coastal cities of the Indian Ocean, the Mediterranean Sea, Western Europe, and Russia.

The revival of the literary tradition in the 17th century also affected the centers of the Armenian diaspora in Europe and Asia: Venice, Lviv, Isfahan, and others. In the Armenian scriptoria of these countries, both new works were created and manuscripts were copied. For instance, in the distant Polish-Lithuanian Commonwealth, manuscripts of historians Kirakos Gandzaketsi, Tovma Metsopetsi, Matenos Urhayetsi, parts of the work of Agathangelos, and the chronology of Armenian kings were copied. Stepan Zakharkevich emphasized the historical ethnocentrism characteristic of medieval Armenian communities: "the development and maintenance of their own perceptions of the historical process and the role and place of the Armenian community within it". According to Petra Košťálová, "An exile or emigrant—on the Armenian language łarib or panduxt—represents one of the cornerstones of Armenian self-consciousness. It can be said without exaggeration that Armenian historiography and literature (both medieval and modern) are permeated with this dominant, or rather ‘key,' theme". However, even in the diaspora, the situation of Armenians was not ideal. As an ethnic and religious minority, they were often subjected to national, social, and religious persecution. According to Zakharkevich, the development of the historiographical tradition in the diaspora was one of the means of resisting assimilation. Through their activities, the diaspora complemented the literary life in Armenia, where, despite harsh conditions, cultural activity did not cease.

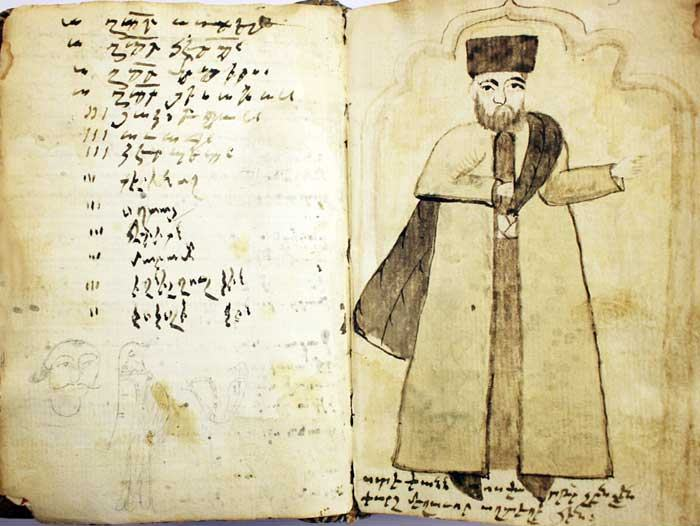
Historian Stepanos Yerets

At the beginning of the 17th century, an entire dynasty of Armenian historians lived in Kamianets-Podilskyi — Hovhannes Avagter, his son Grigor, and grandsons Hakob and Avksent. Their Kamianets Chronicle is a history of the city's Armenian community from 1430 to 1652. The Kamianets Chronicle was one of the sources for the History of the Khotyn War by Hovhannes Kamenatsi. His work is considered a reliable source of information about the victory of Polish-Ukrainian forces over Turkish invaders near the city of Khotyn in 1621 and the peace treaty between the parties; it contains source material in Polish and other languages regarding this battle, consisting of an introduction, 18 chapters, and a colophon. Some parts of the work are based on personal experience and what the author heard from others. According to Kamenatsi himself, the work was written in 1627. The book includes valuable information about the life of the Armenian community of Kamianets-Podilskyi, Poland, and Romania.

Among Eastern European Armenian chroniclers was also Khachgruz Kafayetsi. A native of Kaffa, Khachgruz, in his "Chronicle," described the struggle for the throne of the Crimean Khans, provided a list of dates of some of their reigns, described the wars they waged, and the role of Armenians in these events, along with detailed information on the internal political and economic life of Crimea. The work covers the events of 1583–1658, written in the Crimean dialect of the Armenian language, making it valuable for Armenian dialectology as well.

Reflecting on emigration, Martiros Krymetsi, a 17th-century historian and poet from Crimea, saw its cause in the sinfulness of Armenians. He considered the fall of the Armenian Kingdom in 1045 as the starting point of this process. The poetic chronicle Order and Dates of Armenian Kings by Krymetsi begins with the legendary Hayk and ends with the fall of the Cilician Armenian Kingdom in 1375. According to the author, the poem had educational and moral-psychological purposes. He was particularly concerned about the state of Western Armenians "languishing under the ‘arrogant Turkish nation'".

Historical monuments were also created in the colonies of Eastern countries. A prominent author and public figure of the second half of the 17th century was Constantinopolitan Yeremia Tschelebi Kömürdjian, author of numerous historical, geographical, and other works. In his earliest Brief History of Three Hundred Years, Kömürdjian, in poetic form, recounted the history of Ottoman sultans. He described the state, administrative, and tax systems of the Ottoman Empire, the wars it conducted, the socio-economic and political crises in the state, and the difficult situation of conquered peoples—Armenians, Bulgarians, Greeks, Arabs, and others. Kömürdjian considered the development of the native language and enlightenment as the main factors in preserving the Armenian people. In the book Brief Questions and Answers, Kömürdjian analyzed the history and culture of Armenia. In another work, History of Armenia, he glorified the past of the Armenian people and the military victories of ancient Armenian kings. In his later years, he wrote the Chronicle History in three parts, containing the history of natural disasters in Constantinople, information about the Ottoman Empire's wars and internal life, and the intra-church struggles of Armenian clergy. Kömürdjian's Diary, written in the vernacular, describes the life of the Armenian diaspora and significant events in the Ottoman Empire between 1648 and 1662.

Between 1787 and 1789, the Iranian Armenian Stepanos Yerets wrote the work Angitagir. This book recounts the history of the Armenian community of Iran, particularly the regions of Fereydan, Nor Jugha, and Burva.

=== Travel and Diary ===
A distinct genre of historical writings was travel accounts and memoirs. The literary genre of travel accounts was known in Armenia long before the 17th century. In addition to the "Names of Indian and Persian Cities" by an anonymous 12th-century author, early representatives of this genre include Martiros Yerznkatsi (15th century), Sargis Abegha, Pirzada Kapantsi, and Hovhannes Akhtamartsi (16th century), among others. Starting from the 17th century, travel descriptions became more extensive, providing more information about the author and recording noteworthy reports about the present and past of the visited countries. A separate type of memoir emerged—the diary. The authors of the first diaries were Zakaria Aguletsi, Yeremia Tschelebi Kömürdjian, Gabriel Tokhatsi, and Minas Amdetsi.

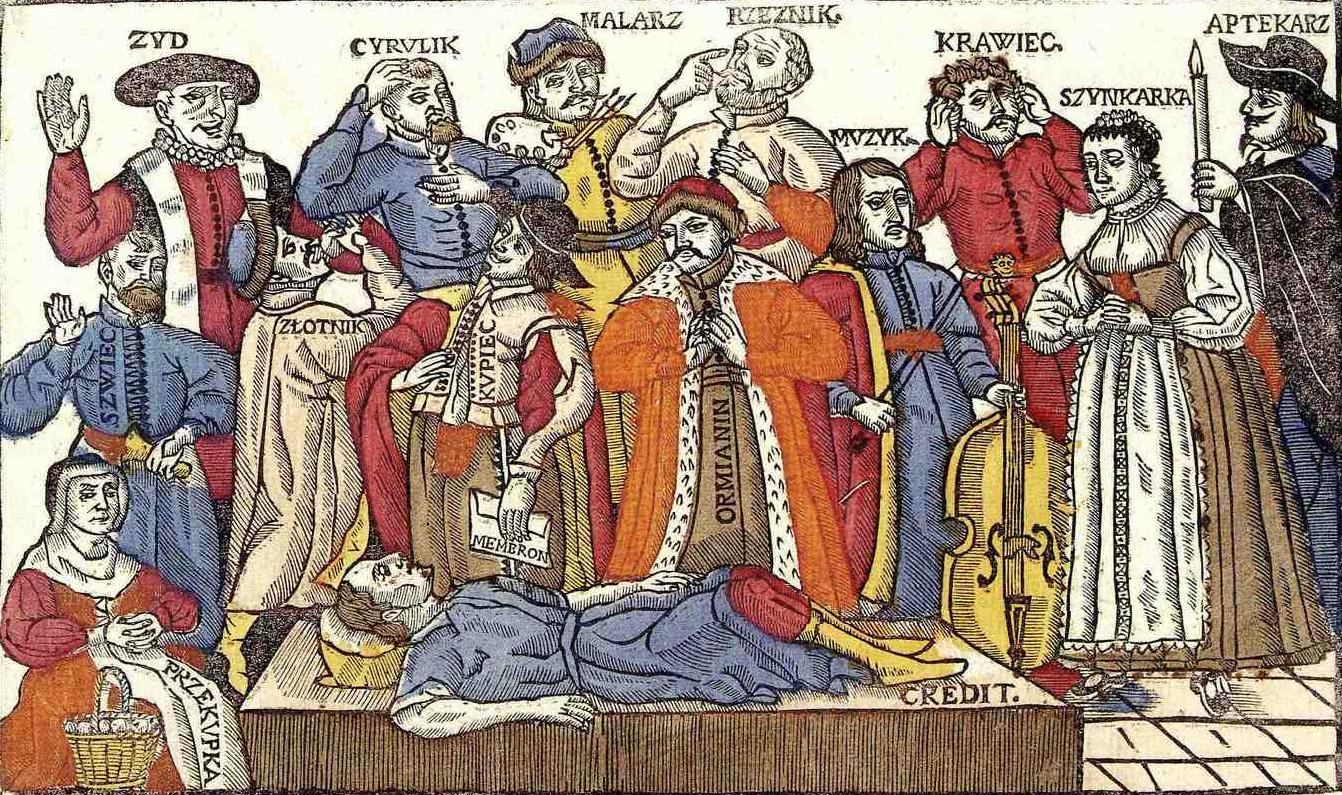
Artistic depiction of an Armenian (Ormianin) among the representatives of the population of the Polish-Lithuanian Commonwealth, 1655

A member of the significant Polish Armenian community of the 16th century was Simeon Lehatsi. Lehatsi is the author of a valuable description of a journey to the East from 1608 to 1619. Beginning his journey in Lviv, Simeon visited Istanbul, the Balkans, Italy, Armenia, Egypt, Palestine, Syria, and Anatolia. He wrote about the customs and manners of various peoples, crafts, trade, agriculture, and more. Lehatsi paid particular attention to Armenian communities. His Travel Notes were written in Middle Armenian.

Zakaria Aguletsi was born in the village of Aghulis near Nakhchivan. As a merchant, he traveled extensively through Persia, Turkey, and European countries. His famous Diary contains detailed information about the social, economic, and cultural life of the countries he visited, as well as their financial and administrative organization. It includes elements of both travel accounts and chronicles. The first part is dedicated to describing trade routes, while the second part recounts Aguletsi's travels from 1647 to 1681. The data is presented against the backdrop of political events in the Erivan and Nakhchivan Khanates. The "Diary" contains valuable ethnographic material.

Similar in type to Zakaria Aguletsi's Diary is the Trade Diary of Khachatur Jughayetsi. In 1682, Jughayetsi set out from the port of Bandar Abbas to India, and in 1686, he traveled to Tibet and arrived in Lhasa. He spent five years in Tibet. In the "Trade Diary," he left valuable information about trade, taxes, and the judicial system in Lhasa. The Trade Diary is an important source on trade and economic relations between Iran, India, Tibet, and Nepal, containing data on Indian cities and the economic life of Armenian communities in the described countries.

In the 17th century, the genre of travel accounts also included works by authors such as Augustin Bejetsi ("Journey through Europe"), Khachatur Yetovpatsi, Hakob Grigoryants (Praise of Britain), Hakob Ssetsi, and others. In the 18th century, the genre of journalistic diaries was enriched by the works of Petros di Sargis Gilanents, Grigor Basmajyan, and others.

== Study of Armenian Historiography ==
The works of Armenian historians began to be published from the mid-17th century. Over the past two hundred years, the majority of Armenian historical texts have been published. In the 19th century, the works of historians were released both in numerous individual editions and in series. In the 1850s, in Paris, Karapet Shahnazaryan published the works of several historians in the series "Shar hay patmagrats. Additionally, various types of research were conducted. For instance, in Armenian studies, efforts have long been made to search for, collect, study, and publish colophons and minor chronicles. Ghevond Pirghalemyan was the first to collect colophons from Armenian manuscripts, though these were only partially published. In the same century, colophons were studied by Garegin Srvandztiants and Hakobos Tashyan.

One of the earliest works in the West primarily dedicated to ancient Armenian sources was Collection des historiens anciens et modernes de l'Arménie" (vols. 1–2, 1867–1869) by French orientalist Victor Langlois, which introduced European readers to a range of written monuments from ancient Armenia. A significant contribution to the study of Armenian sources in the 19th century was made by Marie Brosset, author of the Catalog of Books in the Etchmiadzin Library (1840) and Collections d'historiens arméniens (1874). Brosset also translated Stepanos Orbelian (1864) and Kirakos Gandzaketsi (1870) into French. Separate studies on the History of Armenia by Faustos Buzand and the Ashkharhatsuyts were conducted by Josef Marquart.

The Russian scholarly community first encountered the works of ancient Armenian historians through the efforts of Mkrtich Emin, Keropé Patkanian, and Grigory Khalatyants. Emin and Patkanian were particularly prolific in translation activities. Patkanian also authored a source study, Essay on the History of the Sasanian Dynasty Based on Information Provided by Armenian Writers (1863). In his work The Armenian Epic in the ‘History of Armenia' by Movses Khorenatsi (1896), Khalatyants analyzed various aspects of Movses Khorenatsi's history.

Research and publication of ancient Armenian historiographical monuments became even more intensive in the 20th century. A significant academic step was the release, starting in 1903, of the series "Patmagirk hayots". This series provided a scholarly foundation for future critical editions of key medieval historical works based on early printed books and manuscripts available to specialists involved in the project. During the Soviet period in Armenia, critical editions were published of Koryun (1941), Yeghishe (1957), Kirakos Gandzaketsi (1961), Aristakes Lastivertsi (1963), Abraham Kretatsi (1973), Sebeos (1979), Movses Kaghankatvatsi (1983), Arakel Davrizhetsi (1990), and Movses Khorenatsi (1991). Scholars in the diaspora compiled critical texts of Grigor Aknertsi (1974) and Sebastatsi (1988). After Armenia gained independence, critical texts of Tovma Metsopetsi (1999), Tovma Artsruni (2006), and Samuel Anetsi (2011) were published. In the series Matenagirk Hayots from 2003 to 2013, critical editions of Ghevond, Hovhannes Draskhanakerttsi, John Mamikonean, and Stepanos Taronetsi were also published. Some medieval historians' texts had multiple critical publications; for example, Koryun's "Life of Mashtots" had six such editions. The publication of colophons in the 20th century was handled by Garegin I (Hovsepyan) (1951) and Levon Khachikyan (1950, 1955, 1958). A significant contribution to the study of minor chronicles was made by Vazgen Hakobyan, who compiled the two-volume book Minor Chronicles: XIII–XVIII Centuries (1951, 1956). Additionally, studies were conducted on various aspects and issues of ancient Armenian historical literature. However, researchers primarily focused on individual historians. The most comprehensive study of ancient Armenian historiography, according to Sanjian, was the trilogy by Levon Babayan: Essays on the Historiography of Armenia in the Era of Early Feudalism (V–VIII Centuries) (1977), Essays on the Historiography of Armenia in the Era of Developed Feudalism (IX–XIII Centuries) (1981), and Essays on the Historiography of Armenia (XIV–XVIII Centuries) (1984).

Translations and studies were also conducted in the West. In 1969, Harvard University published the collection Colophons of Armenian Manuscripts, 1301–1480 with translations and commentaries by Avedis Sanjian. Translations of varying quality into English and French were produced, some containing highly valuable historical and literary commentaries: Nina Garsoïan on Buzandaran, Gabriele Winkler on Koryun, Jean-Pierre Mahé on Khorenatsi, on Sebeos. A major contribution to the study of the history of ancient Armenian historical literature was made by Robert W. Thomson (University of Oxford). Since the 1970s, he published English translations of several historians from the Early Middle Ages and High Middle Ages, including Movses Khorenatsi (1976). From the late 1990s, translations of 17th–18th-century historians into English were undertaken by George Bournoutian. Additionally, studies were written on specific periods, such as Thomson's article The Maccabees in Early Armenian Historiography (1975), and Jean-Pierre Mahé's Entre Moïse et Mahomet: réflexion sur l'historiographie arménienne (1992, Laval University), as well as on individual authors, such as Tara L. Andrews' The new age of prophecy: the Chronicle of Matthew of Edessa and its place in Armenian historiography (2009, University of Vienna) and Tim Greenwood's The Universal History of Step'anos Tarōnec'i: Introduction, Translation, and Commentary (2017, University of St Andrews).

Translations and studies continued in Russian, although many authors remain untranslated. Translations of numerous historians' works were carried out by Margarita Darbinyan-Melikyan and L. Khanlaryan. In the early 20th century, a significant contribution to the study of Armenian historians in Russian scholarship was made by Nikolai Marr. His Baptism of Armenians, Georgians, Abkhazians, and Alans by Saint Gregory (Arabic Version) (1905) is dedicated to the history of Agathangelos. In History of Ancient Armenian Literature (1975), Manuk Abeghyan conducted a deep and detailed analysis of the works of Agathangelos, Faustos Buzand, Movses Khorenatsi, Yeghishe, Lazar Parpetsi, and Sebeos. Early medieval Armenian historiographical monuments are studied by I. Vashcheva (Paradoxes of the Historical Concept of Movses Khorenatsi, 2012).

== Bibliography ==
In Armenian

- Babayan, L. (1976). "Historiography". Հայ ժողովրդի պատմություն [History of the Armenian People] (in Armenian). Vol. III. Yerevan: Publishing House of the Academy of Sciences of the Armenian SSR. pp. 803–817.
- Babayan, L. (1987). "Historical Science. Historiography of the 5th–18th Centuries". In Ambarcumyan, V. A. (ed.). Հայկական սովետական հանրագիտարան [Armenian Soviet Encyclopedia] (in Armenian). Vol. 13. pp. 342–343.
- Babayan, L. (2012). "Historiography. Historiography of the 5th–18th Centuries". Հայաստան։ Հանրագիտարան [Armenia: Encyclopedia] (in Armenian). Armenian Encyclopedia. pp. 521–523.
- Vardanyan, Yu. (1985). "К вопросу об авторе и времени компилятивной «Истории города Ани»" [On the Question of the Author and Time of the Compilative "History of the City of Ani"] (PDF). Historical-Philological Journal (in Russian) (2). Yerevan: 212–225.
- Darbinyan, M. (1972). "Historiography". Հայ ժողովրդի պատմություն [History of the Armenian People] (in Armenian). Vol. IV. Yerevan: Publishing House of the Academy of Sciences of the Armenian SSR. pp. 491–510.
- Ambarcumyan, V. A. (1987). "Ancient and Medieval Literature". Հայկական սովետական հանրագիտարան [Armenian Soviet Encyclopedia] (in Armenian). Vol. 13. Yerevan: Армянская советская энциклопедия. pp. 483–494.
- Lalafaryan, S. (1975). "Avetik Tigranakerttsi". Հայկական սովետական հանրագիտարան [Armenian Soviet Encyclopedia] (in Armenian). Vol. 1. p. 615.
- Hakobyan, V. A., ed. (1951). Փոքր ժամանակագրություններ XIII—XVIII դդ [Minor Chronicles: XIII—XVIII Centuries] (in Armenian). Vol. I. Yerevan: Publishing House of the Academy of Sciences of the Armenian SSR.
- Hakobyan, V. A., ed. (1956). Փոքր ժամանակագրություններ XIII—XVIII դդ [Minor Chronicles: XIII—XVIII Centuries] (in Armenian). Vol. II. Yerevan: Publishing House of the Academy of Sciences of the Armenian SSR.
- Movses Khorenatsi (1997). Հայոց Պատմություն [History of Armenia] (in Armenian). Yerevan: Hayastan. pp. 512–525.
- Tertyeryan, B. (1985). "Stepanos Erets". Հայկական սովետական հանրագիտարան [Armenian Soviet Encyclopedia] (in Armenian). Vol. 11. p. 134.

In Russian

- Abramyan, R. (1958). "Армянский путеводитель по Индии XII века" [Armenian Guide to India of the 12th Century] (PDF). Vestnik Matenadarana (in Russian) (4). Yerevan: 317–328. Archived from the original (PDF) on 2015-05-24.
- Anasyan, A. S. (1953). "Армянские хронисты о падении Константинополя" [Armenian Chroniclers on the Fall of Constantinople] (PDF). Vizantiyskiy Vremennik (in Russian). 7 (32): 444–466. Archived from the original (PDF) on 2014-11-05.
- Artamonov, M. I. (1962). История хазар [History of the Khazars] (in Russian). Leningrad: State Hermitage. pp. 17–18.
- Arutyunova-Fidanyan, V. A. (1995). "Образ Византии в армянской средневековой историографии XI–XII вв. (Акоб Санаинци, Маттеос Урхаеци)" [The Image of Byzantium in Armenian Medieval Historiography of the 11th–12th Centuries (Akob Sanaintsi, Matteos Urhayetsi)]. Vizantiyskiy Vremennik (in Russian). 56 (81): 118–126.
- Arutyunova-Fidanyan, V. A. (2003). "Армяне" [Armenians]. In Al-Bakhit, M. A.; Bazin, L.; Sissoko, S. M. (eds.). История человечества [History of Humanity] (in Russian). Vol. IV. Magistr-Press Publishing House. pp. 259–260. ISBN 978-92-3-402813-4.
- Arutyunova-Fidanyan, V. A. (2014). "«Повествование о делах армянских» (VII в.) и «Типик Григория Пакуриана» (XI в.): греческий язык армяно-халкидонитских памятников" ["Narrative of Armenian Affairs" (7th Century) and "Typikon of Gregory Pakourianos" (11th Century): Greek Language of Armenian-Chalcedonian Monuments] (PDF). Vestnik PSTGU (in Russian). 5 (40): 9–21.
- "Гевонд" [Ghevond]. Большая советская энциклопедия [Great Soviet Encyclopedia] (in Russian). Vol. 6. 1971. p. 511.
- Diakonov, M. M.; Kudryavtsev, O. V. (1956). "Армения в III—I вв. до н. э." [Armenia in the 3rd–1st Centuries BCE]. In Belyavsky, A.; Lazarevich, L.; Mongayt, A. (eds.). Всемирная история [World History] (in Russian). Vol. 2. Moscow: State Publishing House of Political Literature. pp. 418–424.
- Zakharkevich, S. (2013). "Армяне Речи Посполитой: анализ модели культурной адаптации" [Armenians of the Polish-Lithuanian Commonwealth: Analysis of the Cultural Adaptation Model] (PDF). In Skvortsova, I. N. (ed.). Художественная культура армянских общин на землях Речи Посполитой: Материалы Международной научной конференции [Artistic Culture of Armenian Communities in the Lands of the Polish-Lithuanian Commonwealth: Proceedings of an International Scientific Conference] (in Russian). Minsk: Art. Design. pp. 20–29.
- Kudryavtsev, O. V. (1956). "Армения в III—IV вв." [Armenia in the 3rd–4th Centuries]. In Belyavsky, A.; Lazarevich, L.; Mongayt, A. (eds.). Всемирная история [World History] (in Russian). Vol. 2. Moscow: State Publishing House of Political Literature. pp. 761–770.
- Nalbandyan, V. S. (1984). "Армянская литература [V—XIII вв.]" [Armenian Literature [5th–13th Centuries]]. История всемирной литературы [History of World Literature] (in Russian). Vol. 2. Moscow: Nauka. pp. 285–308.
- Nalbandyan, V. S. (1985). "Армянская литература [XIII—XVI вв.]" [Armenian Literature [13th–16th Centuries]]. История всемирной литературы [History of World Literature] (in Russian). Vol. 3. Moscow: Nauka. pp. 531–535.
- Nalbandyan, V. S. (1987). "Армянская литература [XVII в.]" [Armenian Literature [17th Century]]. История всемирной литературы [History of World Literature] (in Russian). Vol. 4. Moscow: Nauka. pp. 422–429.
- Nalbandyan, V. S. (1988). "Переводная литература. Историография. Публицистика: [Армянская литература]" [Translated Literature. Historiography. Publicistics: [Armenian Literature]]. История всемирной литературы [History of World Literature] (in Russian). Vol. 5. Moscow: Nauka. pp. 492–495.
- "Народы Кавказа и Средней Азии в XVI и первой половине XVII в." [Peoples of the Caucasus and Central Asia in the 16th and First Half of the 17th Century]. Всемирная история [World History] (in Russian). Vol. 4. Moscow: Socio-Economic Literature Publishing House. 1958.
- Novoseltsev, A. P. (1980). Генезис феодализма в странах Закавказья [Genesis of Feudalism in the Countries of Transcaucasia] (PDF) (in Russian). Moscow: Nauka.
- Novoseltsev, A. P. (1990). Хазарское государство и его роль в истории Восточной Европы и Кавказа [The Khazar State and Its Role in the History of Eastern Europe and the Caucasus] (in Russian). Moscow: Nauka. pp. 29–31.
- Ter-Mkrtichyan, L. (1979). Армянские источники о Средней Азии V—VII вв [Armenian Sources on Central Asia of the 5th–7th Centuries] (PDF) (in Russian). Moscow: Nauka.
- Trevyer, K. V. (1953). Очерки по истории культуры древней Армении (II в. до н. э. — IV в. н. э.) [Essays on the History of the Culture of Ancient Armenia (2nd Century BCE – 4th Century CE)] (PDF) (in Russian). Moscow-Leningrad: Publishing House of the Academy of Sciences of the USSR.
- Khanlaryan, L. A. (1988). "Хроника Амираса Ерзынкаци" [Chronicle of Amiras Yerznkatsi] (PDF). Historical-Philological Journal (in Russian) (4). Yerevan: 188–208.

=== In English ===
- Andrews, T. L. (2011). "Matthew of Edessa". In Mallett Alex (eds.). Christian-Muslim Relations: A Bibliographical History (1050–1200). Vol. 3. BRILL. pp. 444–450. ISBN 978-90-04-19515-8.
- Andrews, T. L. (2013). "Identity, Philosophy, and the Problem of Armenian History in the Sixth Century". In Philip Wood (ed.). History and Identity in the Late Antique Near East. Oxford University Press. pp. 29–41. ISBN 978-0-19-991540-8.
- Armenian History Attributed to Sebeos. Translated by R. W. Thomson. Liverpool University Press. 1999. ISBN 978-0-85323-564-4.
- "Armenian literature". The New Encyclopaedia Britannica. Vol. 1. Encyclopaedia Britannica. 2005. p. 567.
- Bardakjian, K. B. (2000). A Reference Guide to Modern Armenian Literature, 1500–1920: With an Introductory History. Wayne State University Press. ISBN 0-8143-2747-8.
- Cowe, S. P. (1997). "Medieval Armenian Literary and Cultural Trends (Twelfth–Seventeenth Centuries)". In Richard G. Hovannisian (ed.). The Armenian People From Ancient to Modern Times: The Dynastic Periods, From Antiquity to the Fourteenth Century. Vol. I. St. Martin’s Press. pp. 293–327.
- Cowe, S. P. (2012). "Kirakos Ganjakec'i or Arewelc'i". In Thomas, David; Mallett, Alex (eds.). Christian-Muslim Relations: A Bibliographical History (1200–1350). Vol. 4. BRILL. pp. 438–442. ISBN 978-90-04-22854-2.
- Dashdondog, Bayarsaikhan (2010). The Mongols and the Armenians (1220–1335). BRILL. ISBN 978-90-04-18635-4.
- Garsoïan, Nina (1997). "The Byzantine Annexation of the Armenian Kingdoms in the Eleventh Century". In Richard G. Hovannisian (ed.). The Armenian People From Ancient to Modern Times: The Dynastic Periods, From Antiquity to the Fourteenth Century. Vol. I. St. Martin’s Press. pp. 187–199.
- Greenwood, Tim (2010). "T'ovma Artsruni". In Thomas, David; Mallett, Alex (eds.). Christian-Muslim Relations: A Bibliographical History (900–1050). Vol. 2. BRILL. pp. 102–107. ISBN 978-90-04-16976-0.
- Greenwood, Tim (2017). The Universal History of Step'anos Tarōnec'i: Introduction, Translation, and Commentary. Oxford University Press. ISBN 978-0-19-879251-2.
- Hacikyan, A. J.; Basmajian, G.; Franchuk, E. S.; Ouzounian, N. (2002). The Heritage of Armenian Literature: From the Sixth to the Eighteenth Century. Vol. II. Wayne State University Press. ISBN 0-8143-3023-1.
- Hacikyan, A. J.; Basmajian, G.; Franchuk, E. S.; Ouzounian, N. (2005). The Heritage of Armenian Literature: From the Eighteenth Century to Modern Times. Vol. III. Wayne State University Press. ISBN 0-8143-3221-8.
- Košťálová, P. (2014). "Exile and Lamentation in the Armenian Historiographical Tradition of the 16th and 17th Centuries". Archiv orientální. 82 (3): 459–482. doi:10.47979/aror.j.82.3.459-482.
- Lane, George (2003). Early Mongol Rule in Thirteenth-Century Iran: A Persian Renaissance. Routledge. ISBN 978-1-134-43103-8.
- Lane, George (2004). Genghis Khan and Mongol Rule. Greenwood Publishing Group. ISBN 978-0-313-32528-1.
- Mathews, E. Jr. (2000). "Armenia". In William M. Johnston (ed.). Encyclopedia of Monasticism. Routledge. pp. 85–87. ISBN 978-1-136-78716-4.
- Andrews, T. L. (2016). Matt'ēos Uṙhayec'i and His Chronicle: History as Apocalypse in a Crossroads of Cultures. BRILL. ISBN 978-90-04-33035-1.
- Alexander P. Kazhdan (ed.-in-chief), ed. (1991). "Moses Xorenac'i". The Oxford Dictionary of Byzantium. Vol. 2. Oxford University Press. pp. 1417–1418.
- Rapp, Stephen H. (2003). Studies in Medieval Georgian Historiography: Early Texts and Eurasian Contexts. Corpus Scriptorum Christianorum Orientalium. Vol. 601. Peeters Publishers. ISBN 978-90-429-1318-9.
- Russell, James R. (1987). Zoroastrianism in Armenia. Harvard University Press.
- Sanjian, A. K. (1969). Colophons of Armenian Manuscripts, 1301–1480. Harvard University Press.
- Sanjian, A. K. (1987). "Aṙakʿel of Tabrīz". Encyclopaedia Iranica. Vol. II. pp. 249–250.
- Sanjian, A. (September 1, 2012). "Armenian Medieval Historians in Print" (PDF). Armenian Weekly: 13–21.
- Stone, Michael E. (2013). Adam and Eve in the Armenian Traditions, Fifth through Seventeenth Centuries. Early Judaism and Its Literature, 38. Society of Biblical Literature.
- Stopka, Krzysztof (2016). Armenia Christiana: Armenian Religious Identity and the Churches of Constantinople and Rome (4th–15th Century). Jagiellonian University Press. ISBN 978-83-233-9555-3.
- Tezcan, Baki (2012). "Ottoman Historical Writing". The Oxford History of Historical Writing: 1400–1800. Vol. 3. Oxford University Press. pp. 192–212. ISBN 978-0-19-921917-9.
- Thomson, R. W. (1989). "The Historical Compilation of Vardan Arewelc'i". Dumbarton Oaks Papers. 43. Dumbarton Oaks: 125–226. doi:10.2307/1291609. JSTOR 1291609.
- Thomson, Robert W. (1999). Rewriting Caucasian History: The Medieval Armenian Adaptation of the Georgian Chronicles. Clarendon Press.
- Thomson, Robert W. (1997). "Armenian Literary Culture through the Eleventh Century". In Richard G. Hovannisian (ed.). The Armenian People From Ancient to Modern Times: The Dynastic Periods, From Antiquity to the Fourteenth Century. Vol. I. St. Martin’s Press. pp. 199–241.
- Thomson, Robert W. (2001a). "The Concept of 'History' in Medieval Armenian Historians". In Antony Eastmond (ed.). Eastern Approaches to Byzantium: Papers from the Thirty-third Spring Symposium of Byzantine Studies. Ashgate/Variorum. pp. 89–99.
- Thomson, Robert W. (2001b). "The Crusaders through Armenian Eyes". The Crusades from the Perspective of Byzantium and the Muslim World. Dumbarton Oaks. pp. 71–83. ISBN 978-0-88402-277-0.
- Thomson, Robert W. (2005). "Christian Perception of History — The Armenian Perspective". Redefining Christian Identity: Cultural Interaction in the Middle East since the Rise of Islam. Peeters Publishers. pp. 35–44. ISBN 978-90-429-1418-6.
- Thomson, Robert W. (2012). "Vardan Arewelc'i". Christian-Muslim Relations: A Bibliographical History (1200–1350). Vol. 4. BRILL. pp. 443–447. ISBN 978-90-04-22854-2.
- Thomson, Robert W. (2014). "The Major Works of Armenian Historiography (Classical and Medieval)". Armenian Philology in the Modern Era: From Manuscript to Digital Text. BRILL. pp. 303–321. ISBN 978-90-04-27096-1.
- Toumanoff, Cyril (1989). "Bagratids". Encyclopaedia Iranica. Vol. III. pp. 419–422.
- van Lint, Theo Maarten (2012). "From Reciting to Writing and Interpretation: Tendencies, Themes, and Demarcations of Armenian Historical Writing". The Oxford History of Historical Writing: 400–1400. Vol. 2. Oxford University Press. pp. 180–200. ISBN 978-0-19-923642-8.
