= Shapuh Bagratuni =

- Շապուհ Բագրատունի
- Born: Unknown
- Died: Unknown
- Occupation: historian
- Parents: Smbat the Confessor (father); Hripsime,a princess (mother)

Shapuh the Historian or Shapuh Bagratuni (Armenian: Շապուհ պատմիչ, Շապուհ Բագրատունի; dates of birth and death unknown) was a 9th-century Armenian historian. He wrote a history of Ashot I, which has not survived. His work is mentioned by Asoghik, Hovhannes Draskhanakerttsi, Samuel of Ani, Ukhtanes, and other historians, who made extensive use of it. Of these authors, only Draskhanakerttsi provides a relatively detailed account, noting that Ashot I Bagratuni's contemporary, Shapuh Bagratuni, had written a detailed history of the king.To this day, the identity of Shapuh Bagratuni remains uncertain. It is known that his work was written in the vernacular of his time, described as “գեղջուկ բանիւ” (“in rustic language”). In his History of Armenia, Ukhtanes includes a chapter from Shapuh Bagratuni's work entitled:"Regarding the crown of the blessed Constantine—whence and how he managed to receive it from the Lord. Shapuh, son of the patrician Ashot , has written about this in his History"․

== In Kirakos Gandzaketsi's "History of Armenia" ==
Kirakos Gandzaketsi, at the beginning of his History of Armenia, presents prominent representatives of Armenian historiography, mentioning Shapuh Bagratuni alongside Thomas Artsruni, Hovhannes Draskhanakerttsi, Movses Kaghankatvatsi, Ukhtanes, Stepanos Asoghik, Aristakes Lastivertsi, Samuel Anetsi, and Vanakan Vardapet. Gandzaketsi’s testimony indicates that Shapuh’s name was preserved in medieval Armenian literature as a representative of the Armenian historiographical tradition.

Kirakos Gandzaketsi also mentions Shapuh when discussing events from the period of Arab rule. He describes the persecutions, killings, and captivity that took place in Armenia, including events associated with the martyrdom of Smbat the Confessor. For more detailed information about the events of that period and the sufferings endured, Gandzaketsi directs the reader to the works of Thomas Artsruni, Shapuh, and other historians.

== Identity and connection to Ghevond's "History" ==
In their study of Ghevond’s "History", Sergio La Porta and Alison M. Vacca present Shapuh Bagratuni as a member of the Bagratuni noble house, at whose behest Ghevond composed a history covering the preceding century and a half. The authors suggest that the death of Shapuh’s father—who perished during the suppression of the 775 rebellion—and Shapuh’s subsequent inheritance of a portion of his father’s estates may have influenced his decision to commission the historical work. They posit that the "History"could have served to strengthen the position of the Bagratunis and assist in political decision-making. At the same time, the authors note that Shapuh’s true motivations remain unknown.

In the section of the book dedicated to dating Ghevond’s *History*, the question of Shapuh’s identity is also discussed. According to the traditional view, Shapuh Bagratuni—the patron who commissioned Ghevond’s work—was the brother of Ashot Msaker. This identification is based on information preserved in the historical work of Vardan Areveltsi. However, Timothy Greenwood has proposed an alternative hypothesis, suggesting that the Shapuh who commissioned Ghevond’s work might be the same individual as Shapuh Bagratuni, the author of a lost history. According to Greenwood’s perspective, that history covered events beginning in the year 790 and extended into the 9th century.

One of the key arguments supporting Greenwood’s hypothesis is the mention in Ghevond’s work of Ashot Bagratuni being proclaimed King of Armenia on August 26, 884. This detail could serve as a basis for assigning a later date to the work. However, La Porta and Vacca note that this hypothesis faces certain challenges. Specifically, Ghevond expresses a negative view of the monk who foretold the rise of the Bagratuni dynasty—a stance that is difficult to reconcile with the assumption that the work was written after the establishment of the Bagratuni kingdom. In the view of these authors, the traditional dating of the work to the 8th century remains a sound explanation, although questions regarding the identity of Shapuh and the dating of the text have not been definitively resolved.

Important information concerning the connection between Shapuh and Ghevond’s History has also been preserved in a manuscript colophon. According to the text, Ghevond’s work was composed “by the command of Lord Shapuh Bagratuni” («ի հրամանէ տեառն Շապհոյ Բագրատունոյ»).The colophon further states that Hamazasp of the Mamikonian family wished to preserve the work and commissioned the scribe Sargis to copy it at his own expense.

“Ghevond’s historical account concerning the chronology of the House of Torgom was completed. It had been written at the command of Lord Shapuh Bagratuni. Lord Hamazasp, of the distinguished Mamikonian family, also desired to possess this work and, from the proceeds of his honest earnings, ordered the humble scribe Sargis to copy it. I beseech you to remember him before merciful God, and glory be to Him forever and ever. Amen.”

It is therefore necessary to distinguish between Shapuh Bagratuni, who originally commissioned the historical work, and Hamazasp Mamikonian, who commissioned the copying of the surviving manuscript. Scholars identify Hamazasp as the abbot of Hovhannavank Monastery, who held this position from 1274 to 1311.

In the commentary on the colophon, Shapuh is identified as the son of Smbat, the grandson of Ashot the Blind, and the brother of Ashot Msaker. According to the same explanatory note, Shapuh died in 824. This information is important for establishing his genealogical background; however, it does not,in itself conclusively resolve whether he was the same person as Shapuh Bagratuni, the author of the lost historical work.

Another important issue related to Shapuh’s name is the History of the Anonymous Narrator, also known in scholarly literature as Pseudo-Shapuh. According to the study, the work was mistakenly attributed to Shapuh Bagratuni. It is a collection of medieval Armenian narratives and traditions. Its first part presents stories concerning the life of Muhammad, the emperors Maurice and Heraclius, the Holy Cross, and Vard Rshtuni, while the second part contains accounts of various figures and events from different periods in Vaspurakan’s history. The works of Ghevond and this collection contain overlapping narratives, including accounts concerning Vard Rshtuni, Muhammad ibn Marwan’s campaign, and Tajat Andzevatsi.

== Manuscript attributed to Shapuh and its authenticity ==
An important place in the study of the lost work of Shapuh the Historian is occupied by the manuscript discussed in Bishop Mesrop’s article “Shapuh Bagratuni.” Galust Ter-Mkrtchyan discovered a text in manuscript No. 319, brought from the Lim Hermitage, which he considered to be the lost history written by Shapuh Bagratuni.

The manuscript consisted of several sections containing traditions relating to the Arab invasions, Byzantine emperors, and the history of Armenian princely houses. The first section recounts the life of Muhammad, his teachings, and the early Arab campaigns. It is followed by narratives concerning the emperors Maurice and Heraclius, as well as traditions about the return of the Holy Cross and the Cross of Varag. Other sections of the manuscript contain accounts of Bagratuni and Artsruni princes, including Gagik, Smbat, Ashot, and Derenik; episodes involving Vard Patrik and Tachat Andzevatsi; conflicts with Arab emirs; and relations between Armenian princely houses.

Nevertheless, the content of the manuscript does not provide sufficient grounds to attribute it unconditionally to Shapuh Bagratuni. In scholarly literature, this historiographical work is also known as "Pseudo-Shapuh" (Pseudo-Šapuh).
