= Margarita Darbinyan =

Armenian historian and translator (1920–2021)

- Մարգարիտա Հովնանի Դարբինյան-Մելիքյան
- Born: 18 March 1920; Occupied Batumi, British Empire
- Died: 9 March 2021 (aged 100); Yerevan, Armenia
- Education: Candidate of Historical Sciences, Moscow State Pedagogical Institute (1941)
- Occupations: Historian and translator
- Employer(s): Yerevan Brusov State University of Languages and Social Sciences, Institute of Oriental Studies of the National Academy of Sciences of the Republic of Armenia, Matenadaran
- Awards: Order of the Patriotic War

Margarita Darbinyan-Melikyan (Armenian: Մարգարիտա Դարբինյան-Մելիքյան; 18 March 1920 – 9 March 2021) was an Armenian historian and translator.

== Biography ==
Margarita Darbinyan was born on March 18, 1920, in Batum, Georgian SSR. Her father was an Armenian Catholic, and her mother a Polish Catholic. Both of her parents knew Russian, but neither spoke each other's native languages of Armenian and Polish. Margarita was raised speaking Russian at home, learning Armenian through Classical Armenian. In 1941, Margarita Darbinyan graduated from the Moscow Pedagogical Institute. Returning to Armenia, she was appointed to work in Chibukhlu (now Tsovagyugh). In 1951, she began teaching at the Yerevan Institute of Russian and Foreign Languages, becoming a senior researcher at the Institute of Oriental Studies in 1958, and at Matenadaran in 1959.

Margarita studied and translated the primary sources of Armenian historiography from Classical Armenian into Russian and made references. She compiled the original text of Tovma Artsruni's book History of the House of Artsruni and wrote the foreword and references. She made translations into Armenian from several languages including Persian, German, English, French, Italian, and Arabic.

Darbinyan died in Yerevan on 9 March 2021, aged 100.
