= Abraham Yerevantsi =

18th-century Armenian historian

Abraham Yerevantsi also known as Abraham of Yerevan (Armenian: Աբրահամ Երևանցի) was an 18th-century Armenian historian who lived in the late Safavid and early Afsharid era's. He is known for being the author of one work, which was edited later on, known variously as the History of the Persian king, The History of the Wars 1721-1736, or as the History of the Wars fought by the Ottomans over Armenian and Persian cities. The work contains valuable information on the Afghan invasion, the Ottoman-Persian Wars, Nader Shah's coronation at the Mugan plain, as well as of the defense by the local Armenians of the Yerevan Province against the Ottoman invasion in 1724. The work is located on the San Lazzaro degli Armeni. A copy of the edited version was brought to Soviet Armenia in 1928 and was published in 1938.

== Sources ==
- Bournoutian, George A. (2002). "ABRAHAM OF EREVAN". Encyclopaedia Iranica.
