= Gregory of Akner =

Armenian historian and author

Gregory of Akner (Armenian: Գրիգոր Ակներցի) or Grigor Aknertsi, Grigor Akants, Akanc was a thirteenth-century Armenian historian and author. He is best known for his valuable work, the History of the Nation of the Archers, which is an important source for the Mongol conquest of the Near East and the period of Mongol rule in Armenia. It is the only work of Armenian literature of which the original manuscript has survived to the present day.

Gregory moved from Eastern Armenia to Cilicia in the years of 1265 or 1266, where he joined the Akner monastery.

His work was edited and published with an English translation by Robert P. Blake and Richard N. Frye in 1949. A new English translation by Robert Bedrosian appeared in 2003.
