= Aristakes Lastivertsi =

Armenian historian (c. 1002 – 1080)

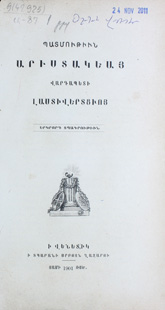
Title page of the 1901 publication of Lastivertsi's history

Aristakes Lastivertsi (Old Armenian: Արիստակէս Լաստիվերցի; (Note: Also Լաստիվերտցի, Lastiverttsʻi) c. 1002 – 1080) was a medieval Armenian historian and chronicler. The author of many works, Aristakes's most valuable contribution in the field of the historiography was his History About the Sufferings Occasioned by Foreign Peoples Living Around Us, (Note: Old Armenian: Պատմութիւն Արիստակիսի Լաստիվերտցւոյ վասն անցիցն անցելոյ ի յայլասեռն ազգաց որք շուրջ զմեւք են, Patmutʻiwn Aristakisi Lastiverttsʻwoy vasn antsʻitsʻn antsʻeloy i yaylaseṛn azgatsʻ orkʻ shurj zmewkʻ en) which describes Bagratid Armenia's relations with the Byzantine Empire and Georgia and the devastating Seljuk invasions of the 11th century and the torture of Christians by the Seljuks.

== Biography ==
Once thought to have been born in a village called either Lastivard or Lastivert, scholars now believe that Aristakes was born in a village called Lastiver, the location of which is unknown. Details about his life are fragmented. The date of his birth has been estimated as 1002, and he is assumed to have died in old age not long after completing his history in 1079. As a vardapet, he was well versed in Christian theology and rhetoric and knew Greek and probably several other languages. He wrote his history from 1072 to 1079, without the support of a patron, recounting contemporary history of which he was an eyewitness. Composed of 25 chapters and a unique colophon, Aristakes describes the Seljuk invasions in 1047-48 through the capture of Ani in 1064 and the Battle of Manzikert in 1071.

== Manuscript history ==
There are more than 25 extant manuscripts of Lastivertsi's history, the oldest of which was begun in the 14th century and completed in 1567. Besides a manuscript copied in 1599, the others were produced in the 18th and 19th centuries.
