= Tovma Artsruni =

9th century Armenian historian

- Title page of the 1985 Modern Armenian translation of Tovma Artsruni's History of the House of Artsrunik
- Occupation: Historian
- Known for: History of the House of Artsrunik

Tovma Artsruni (Armenian: Թովմա Արծրունի; also known in English-language historiography as Thomas Artsruni) was a ninth- to tenth-century Armenian historian who authored the History of the House of Artsrunik (Patmut’iwn Tann Artsruneats’). Despite its title, the four-volume work not only relates the history of the Artsruni royal family, of which Tovma was a member, but also comprehensively covers the history of Armenia.

== History of the House of Artsrunik ==
Tovma began writing History sometime in the 870s. Much like other histories composed by Armenian historians, the first volume starts with the origins of the Armenian nation and ends in the middle of the fifth century. However, Tovma's most valuable contributions are found in the second and third volumes, which accurately detail Armenian life under the rule of the Arab Caliphates and in particular the 851 Arab military expedition led by the Turkic general Bugha al-Kabir, its subsequent consequences, and the establishment of the independent Bagratid kingdom of Armenia north of Lake Van. Tovma was a relative of the Artsruni king of Vaspurakan, Gagik I, and wrote a detailed account in History about the famous palace and church Gagik constructed on Akhtamar Island.

The precise date that Tovma completed his work is unknown, although some historians have determined that it was composed sometime after 905. Tovma's work ends with an incomplete 29th chapter, yet several unknown authors (collectively called Ananun 'anonymous' in Armenian historiography) took it upon themselves to continue Tovma's History down to the 1370s and added an appendix and colophon. Tovma's History was first published in 1852 in Constantinople in Armenian and was subsequently translated into French by Marie-Félicité Brosset in 1862. A translation into modern Armenian by Vrej Vardanyan was published in 1978. Robert W. Thomson translated the history into English in 1985.
