= Matsnaberd Principality =

Medieval Armenian principality

Principality of Matsnaberd Մածնաբերդի իշխանություն
- 1118–13th century
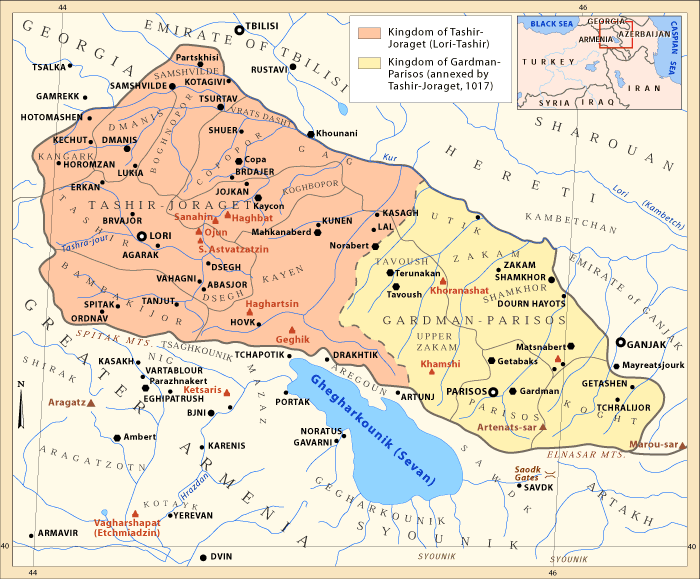
- The principality was a rump state of what was once the Kingdom of Tashir-Dzoraget, only Matsnaberd and its surroundings were still controlled by the Kiurikian dynasty.
- Capital: Matsnaberd
- Common languages: Armenian
- Religion: Armenian Apostolic Church
- Government: Principality
  - 1118–1145: David II (first)
  - 13th century: Sargis (last known)
- Historical era: Middle Ages
  - Established: 1118
  - Fall of Tavouch, Abbas I flees to the principality: 1145
  - Death of David II: 1145
  - Last mention of a ruler in the region: 1249
  - Disestablished: 13th century
Preceded by	Succeeded by
Kingdom of Tashir-Dzoraget	Golden Horde

The principality of Matsnaberd (Armenian: Մածնաբերդի իշխանություն) was an Armenian feudal principality of the Kiurikian dynasty as well as a rump state of the Kingdom of Lori. It existed to the west of the historical region of Greater Armenia Utik, in the 12th and 13th century.

== History ==
The founder of the principality was David II, son of the king of the Tashir-Dzoraget kingdom, Kiurike II, who, after the fall of Tashir-Dzoraget, settled in the fortress of Matsnaberd (Armenian: Մածնաբերդ). The Kyurikeans of Matsnaberd were vassals of the Zakaryan family, rulers of central Armenia, and had political ties with the neighboring principalities of Tavush, Aterk, and Nor-Berd, as well as with the Georgian princely family of Orbeliani. In the first half of the 12th century, the principality was in a state of conflict with the Ganja Emirate.

David died around 1145 and was succeeded by his son, Kiurike III. Little is known about Kyurike III's reign. Kyurike had five daughters and two sons, one of whom, 12-year-old Abas II, inherited the throne after his father's death in 1170. At the age of 17, he married Nana, the sister of Zakare Zakarian. Two years after their wedding, at the age of 19, Abas died (c. 1176). Under the protection of Abas's sister, Borina, his illegitimate son, Aghsartan (Armenian: Աղսարթան), inherited the throne. However, this turn of events did not please David, Prince of Nor Berd, who considered himself a direct descendant of the Bagratids and Aghsartan an impostor.

David married his daughter to Aghsartan and later, after seizing Matsnaberd by ruse, expelled Aghsartan from the fortress. However, the local population did not recognize the authority of the new ruler and revolted, forcing David to abandon the fortress, while Aghsartan reclaimed the throne of Matsnaberd. The date of Aghsartan's death is unknown but it is known that during his lifetime he ceded the throne to his son, Kiurike IV. Under Kiurike IV, Matsnaberd may have been temporarily captured by the Mongols. Kiurike IV had three sons: Aghsartan, Tadiadin, and Pahlavan. Aghsartan II and Pahlavan inherited the throne, but no information remains about them. It is only known that Tadiadin participated in the Armenian regiment during the Mongol campaign against Baghdad and Nfrkert.

The last known Kiurikide was Tadiadin's son, Sargis, Prince of Matsnaberd. Information about him has been preserved from an inscription from 1249 in the Haghpat Monastery.

== List of princes ==
Monarch	Reign	Notes
David II	1118–1145	First prince of Matsnaberd that he founded after the Kingdom of Lori fell.
Kiurike III	1145–1170	Son of David II, nothing much known.
Abbas II	1170–1176	Son of Kiurike III, married Nana, the sister of Zakare Zakarian. Died at the age of 19.
Aghsartan	1176–12th century	Illegitimate son of Abbas II, inherited the throne with the help of Abbas' sister Borina
David III	c.12th century	Prince of Nor-Berd, briefly usurped the throne from Aghsartan before being chased by a revolt from the local population
Aghsartan (2nd time)	c.12th century	Reclaimed the throne after David was chased.
Kiurike IV	c. 13th century	Son of Aghsartan I, Matsnaberd might have been briefly captured by the Mongols during his rule.
Aghsartan II and Pahlavan	c. 13th century	Sons of Kiurike IV, nothing else known.
Taghiadin	c. 13th century	Son of Kiurike IV, participated in the Armenian regiment during the Mongol campaign against Baghdad and Tigranocerta.
Sargis I	c. 1249	son of Taghiadin I, last known ruler of the principality attested by an inscription dated to c. 1249

The Haghpat Monastery served as the burial place of several of those rulers.

== Nowadays ==
Nowadays, what remains of Matsnaberd is located in Azerbaijan near the city of Chovdar in the Dashkasan District, the ruins of the fortress are located east of a mountain surrounded by deep gorges.
