= Kingdom of Tashir-Dzoraget =

Medieval Armenian kingdom

Kingdom of Tashir-Dzoraget Տաշիր-Ձորագետի Թագավորություն
- 979–1118
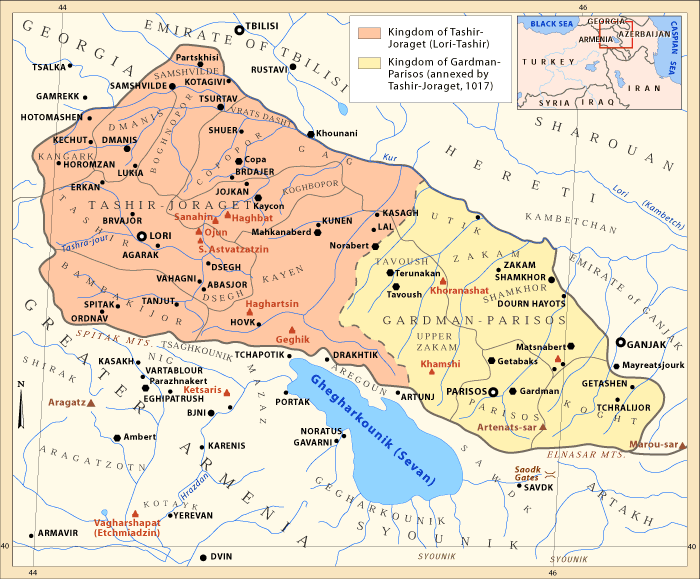
- Kingdom of Tashir-Dzoraget c. 1017 A.D.
- Capital: Matsnaberd (979-1065); Lori (1065-1118)
- Common languages: Armenian
- Religion: Armenian Apostolic Church
- Government: Monarchy
  - 979–989: Kiurike I (first)
  - 1089–1118: David II and Abbas I (last)
- Historical era: Middle Ages
  - Established: 979
  - Kiurike I becomes the first ruler.: 979
  - Disestablished: 1118
Preceded by
Bagratid Armenia
Succeeded by
Kingdom of Georgia
Matsnaberd Principality
Principality of Tavush

The Kingdom of Tashir-Dzoraget (Armenian: Տաշիր-Ձորագետի Թագավորություն Tashir-Dzorageti t'agavorut'yun), alternatively known as the Kingdom of Lori or Kiurikian Kingdom by later historians, was a medieval Armenian kingdom formed in the year 979 by the Kiurikian dynasty, a branch of the Bagratuni dynasty, as a vassal kingdom of the Bagratid Kingdom of Armenia. The first capital of the kingdom was Matsnaberd, currently part of modern-day Azerbaijan.

The Kingdom of Tashir-Dzoraget, also known as the Kingdom of Lori or the Kiurikian Kingdom of Lori, was a feudal state under Bagratid suzerainty in medieval Armenia. Various dates are circulated regarding the founding of the kingdom, ranging from 966 to 988. It collapsed in 1113. It occupied the southern and eastern parts of the Gugark province of Greater Armenia, as well as northern Utik, including Gardman and Pharisos. The kingdom was founded in 982 by Smbat the Master of the Universe (Smbat II), King of Bagratid Armenia, following the coronation of Gurgen I Kiurike. Originally, it was a vassal kingdom dependent on the Bagratids. The kingdom founded by Gurgen I stretched from the Pambak and Aghstev valleys to the vicinity of Tbilissi, the Tsaghkunyats mountain range, and Nig canton. To the north, it bordered the Kingdom of Georgia and the Arab Emirate of Tbilisi; to the south, the Principality of the Pahlavuni; to the east, the Armenian regions under the rule of the Shaddadids; and to the west, the main domains of the Bagratids of Ani. Kiurike honorably completed the construction of the Sanahin and Haghpat monastic complexes and, after his death in 989, was buried in the former.

Gurgen was succeeded by the prominent king of Tashir-Dzoraget, David I Kiurikian (later known as Anhoghin / "Landless"), during whose long reign of over half a century the country reached the peak of its power. David Anhoghin made the border fortress city of Shamshulde the royal capital. David Kiurikian attempted to break free from dependency on the Kingdom of Ani and raised a rebellion against Gagik I, but upon losing, he forfeited his territorial holdings along the Aghstev River. He fortified the country’s external borders, defeated the troops of the Emir of Gandzak who had raided Tashir-Dzoraget’s borders, subjected the Kingdom of Kakheti-Hereti and the Principality of Dmanisi to his influence, and established stable relations with neighboring states. After the fall of the Bagratid Kingdom of Ani in 1045, Tashir-Dzoraget became a de facto fully independent state, alongside the kingdoms of Kars-Vanand and Syunik. Due to a policy driven by narrow personal self-interest, David Anhoghin received the derogatory nickname "Davih" (the Classical Armenian word for "demonic") from historians.

David Anhoghin was succeeded by his son, Kiurike (or Gurgen) II, who ruled as an independent king. To emphasize his pan-Armenian ambitions, he even minted currency, an act unique in the history of the Bagratid Kingdom. Through his efforts, the capital was transferred to the fortress of Lore. However, the independence of the Kiurikian Kingdom of Tashir-Dzoraget was short-lived, as it soon fell into the sphere of political influence of the neighboring Byzantine Empire. In 1113, unable to withstand the continuous attacks of the Seljuks, the Kiurikians abandoned their ancestral domains and settled in Tavush and Matsnaberd. That year, the Kingdom of Tashir-Dzoraget collapsed, although the Kiurikians established new principalities in those territories, which survived until the establishment of the Zakarid Principality. The Kingdom of Tashir-Dzoraget was one of the last remnants of Armenian statehood, acting as the successor to the Bagratids.

== Name ==
In 966, Gurgen I was proclaimed the ruler of Lori. In Armenian historiography, the domain is also widely known by the descriptive name "Tashir-Dzoraget," stemming from the Tashir River—which originates in the Virahayots Mountains—and the Dzoraget River flowing through the Lori Plateau. It is also frequently referred to by the name of its founding dynasty as the "Kiurikian Kingdom," with its establishment traced back as early as 966.

The history of the kingdom was documented by chroniclers such as Matthew of Edessa, Smbat Sparapet, Stepanos Taronetsi (Asoghik), Mkhitar of Ani, Mkhitar of Ayrivank, Vardan Areveltsi, and others. Georgian historical records have also played a crucial role in forming a complete historical picture. The history of Tashir-Dzoraget is even reflected in Kartlis Tskhovreba ("The Life of Georgia"), the most comprehensive account of the history of the Georgian people.Among Georgian authors, Vakhushti Bagrationi provides valuable details about the Kingdom of Lori in his geographical work, Description of the Kingdom of Georgia.

Matthew of Edessa covered the story of Tashir-Dzoraget in his Chronicle, which he began writing in 1113, right after the kingdom's fall. In his text, Matthew took a critical stance toward all the kings of Tashir-Dzoraget who succeeded Kiurike I, writing the following about David Anhoghin ("David the Landless"):

"In the Armenian year 490 [1041–1042 AD], David Anhoghin, the kinsman of Hovhannes, King of Armenia, brought countless calamities upon the Armenian land. He attacked the Kingdom of Armenia, putting numerous cantons to the sword and carrying away many captives. Leaving the country of Caucasian Albania behind, he marched with his army into the Armenian land. His soldiers inflicted immense suffering, after which David returned to his own country."— Matthew of Edessa, Chronicle

== History ==
In the first half of the 7th century, Armenia was occupied by the Arab Caliphate, and in 701, the Governorate of Arminiya was established in the region. Following the anti-Arab rebellion of 850–855, the Caliph of Baghdad, Jafar ibn Muhammad al-Mutawakkil, came to terms with the autonomy of the Christians and appointed the leader of the uprising, Ashot Bagratuni, as the ruler of Armenia. Ashot established friendly ties with the Artsruni princes of Vaspurakan and the Syuni princes of Syunik, bringing them under his authority. Smaller Armenian principalities in the regions of Gugark,Artsakh, and elsewhere, as well as the Arab emirates formed in southern Armenia, recognized Ashot's suzerainty. In 885, Ashot Bagratuni was proclaimed King of Armenia, effectively restoring Armenian statehood.

By the 10th century, Armenia entered the High Middle Ages, a period characterized by decentralization, feudal fragmentation, and internal strife. Starting from the early 10th century, the first separatist movements against the central authority emerged, giving rise to several subordinate kingdoms. Gradually, the kingdoms of Vaspurakan, Syunik, Vanand-Kars, and Tashir-Dzoraget were established, alongside the Curopalatanate of Tayk, the principalities of Khachen-Pharisos, and Taron, all of which acknowledged the suzerainty of the Bagratid "Shahanshah" (King of Kings).

The Kingdom of Tashir-Dzoraget was founded by the Kiurikians, a junior branch of the Bagratid dynasty that had established itself in Gugark (specifically in the basins of the Debed and Aghstev rivers and neighboring cantons). Before long, they leveraged the internal feudal conflict sweeping Armenia to forge their own semi-independent state—the Kingdom of Tashir-Dzoraget, or Lori—which endured for about a century and a half.

== Foundation of the Kingdom ==
As feudal relations deepened in Bagratid Armenia, the growing separatist ambitions of increasingly powerful local princes, combined with the negative influence of external powers, caused the state to embark on a gradual path of fragmentation and decline from the beginning of the 10th century. Political entities began to emerge that often only formally acknowledged the supremacy of the Bagratids of Ani, including local kingdoms and principalities. Among them was the Kyurikian Kingdom of Tashir-Dzoraget. During the early period of the Bagratid Kingdom, Tashir was administered by appointed governors or overseers who did not belong to the royal dynasty. Later, however, in view of their increasingly open separatist aspirations and the necessity of maintaining reliable control over this strategically important region through a member of the royal family, Ashot III the Merciful (953–977) appointed his eldest son Smbat, who had been his co-ruler since at least 958, as governor of Tashir before 972. After Smbat inherited the Armenian throne as sole ruler, he appointed his younger brother Gurgen, who also bore the additional name Derenik, as governor of Tashir in his place. It was Gurgen who, after his uncle Mushegh, founded a new kingdom belonging to the junior branch of the Bagratid dynasty and subordinate to the Bagratids of Ani. The designation Kyurikian, referring both to this local kingdom and its ruling dynasty, derives from the local pronunciation of Gurgen’s name as Kyurike. The establishment of the Kyurikian Kingdom was a gradual process, and the date of its proclamation remains disputed in historiography, with proposed dates ranging from 966 to 988. This is largely because, among the primary sources, only Mkhitar Ayrivanetsi records the year in which Gurgen became king. According to him, this occurred in 981. The other two authors who mention the event—the anonymous chronicler, presumed to have lived in the 12th century, and Vardan Vardapet—do not provide a date. According to the anonymous chronicler, after Ashot III’s death, his sons Smbat, Gagik, and Gurgen “amicably divided the kingdom among themselves, recognizing Smbat as the head of the family.” According to Vardan, Ashot III died “leaving three sons, Smbat, Gagik, and Gurgen; on that very day the eldest son Smbat received the crown… while the younger brother inherited Tashir together with the Sevordik and Dzoraget.”

Thus, according to all three primary sources mentioned above, Gurgen became king only after his father’s death—that is, after 977. This is clearly confirmed by a memorandum written in 979 by Simeon, secretary and scribe of Sanahin Monastery, in which Gurgen is referred to as “the prince of the land of Tashir.” In the inscription on a khachkar in the cemetery of Kurthan village, dated 986, Gurgen already appears under the name Kyurike with the royal title. It is true that Matthew of Edessa refers to Gurgen as the “King of Albania” in connection with the military campaign organized by Ashot III in 974 against the expedition of Emperor John I Tzimiskes, listing him among the participating rulers. However, this is an anachronism, since at that time the Kyurikians possessed no territories in Aghvank. Furthermore, among the rulers listed by Matthew, Abas became King of Kars only in 984, while Senekerim ascended the throne of Vaspurakan in 1003. As for King Philip of Kapan, who is also mentioned in the same list, he was in fact one of the princes of Artsakh. Therefore, the Kyurikian Kingdom of Tashir-Dzoraget must have been established after the death of Ashot III, between 979 and 985. Taking all the available evidence into account, the date proposed by Mkhitar Ayrivanetsi should be accepted, and Gurgen’s proclamation as king of Tashir-Dzoraget should be dated to 981. One might suppose that this event resulted from the weakening of the central Bagratid authority and associate it with the invasion of Armenia by the Sallarid Emir of Atropatene, Abu al-Hayja, in 982, thereby dating the proclamation to that year. However, although Abu al-Hayja—who invaded Armenia at the instigation of Mushegh, King of Kars-Vanand—captured Dvin, advanced into Shirak, and devastated Horomos Monastery, he was defeated and taken prisoner in battle against Abutlup, Emir of Goghtn, who had been sent against him by Smbat II. Moreover, Smbat II’s authority did not suffer any significant weakening. Consequently, the year 981, indicated by Mkhitar Ayrivanetsi, should be accepted as the year of the proclamation of the Kyurikian Kingdom of Tashir-Dzoraget.

As is evident from the above-mentioned chronicle, Gurgen recognized the supremacy of his elder brother and received part of the paternal inheritance on the condition of his unconditional submission to him. The boundaries of the Kyurikian Kingdom of Tashir-Dzoraget are known from the testimonies of the anonymous chronicler, presumed to have lived in the 12th century, Vardan Vardapet, and Mkhitar Ayrivanetsi, and especially from a decree of Smbat II (977–991), dated 979. According to the anonymous chronicler, Gurgen ruled over “the lands of Gugark, beginning from Gag, Kharra, as far as the Gates of Tiflis.” According to Vardan Vardapet, he received “Tashir together with the Sevordiks and Dzoraget; Kayen and Kaytson; Khorkhorunik, where Khora was built, namely Khozhorni and Khorakert; and Bazunik, that is Bazkert in the district of Tashir, together with other famous fortresses.” Mkhitar Ayrivanetsi confines himself to the brief statement: “Gurgen ruled in Virk (Georgia), and his brother Smbat ruled in Armenia.” The future boundaries of the Kyurikian Kingdom of Tashir-Dzoraget are described in greater detail in the decree issued by Smbat II during his visit to Sanahin in 979. The kingdom extended from the valleys of the Pambak and Aghstev rivers to the vicinity of Tiflis, as well as to the Tsaghkunyats Mountain Range and the district of Nig. To the north it bordered the Bagratid Kingdom of Georgia and the Arab Emirate of Tiflis; to the south, the principality of the Pahlavunis; to the east, Armenian territories under the rule of the Shaddadids; and to the west, the core domains of the Bagratids of Ani.

The region entrusted by Smbat II to Gurgen as governor and overseer constituted a separate administrative and political unit and therefore required a corresponding ecclesiastical organization—a diocesan jurisdiction encompassing its entire territory. By the mid-960s, after the construction of the Church of the Holy Savior (Amenaprkich) at Sanahin Monastery, Ashot III and Queen Khosrovanuysh had granted estates to the monastery, which became the center of the ecclesiastical diocese of Tashir, with the Church of the Holy Savior serving as its cathedral. By 970, the head of this diocese was Bishop Grigor, as confirmed by the above-mentioned testimony of Simeon, dated 972: “During the episcopate in our province of Tashir of the worthy shepherd Bishop Grigor, who had already held this office for two years.” However, the newly established administrative unit entrusted to Gurgen covered a considerably larger territory than that previously administered by Smbat, while the jurisdiction of the Diocese of Tashir did not extend over all its districts. According to established practice, the boundaries of secular and ecclesiastical authority within any administrative unit were expected to coincide. The need to eliminate this discrepancy, together with Smbat II’s desire to make the Holy Mother of God Church, the burial place of his ancestors, rather than the Church of the Holy Savior, the cathedral of the newly established diocese, explains his visit to Sanahin in 979 and the issuance of the corresponding decree.

By this decree, through Catholicos Khachik I, Smbat II elevated the Holy Mother of God Church of Sanahin to the status of cathedral of the ecclesiastical organization encompassing the territories entrusted to Gurgen and established a new diocese under the leadership of Bishop Isaiah. It included: “The whole land of Tashir, Upper and Lower, from Mount Bazum on both sides to the borders of Gugark, to the frontiers of Tiflis and Georgia, to the borders of the district of Nig, to the boundaries of Kayen, to the borders of Tsaghkots, and as far as the borders of the house of Shirak.”

After the capital of the Armenian state was transferred to Ani and the Armenian kingdom became stronger, autonomous principalities and kingdoms began to emerge that recognized the supremacy of the Bagratids of Ani, while maintaining internal independence. Tashir was administered by appointed governors who did not belong to the royal dynasty. Taking into account the separatist ambitions of local princes and the strategic importance of the region, Ashot III the Merciful (953–977) appointed his eldest son and co-ruler, Smbat, as governor of Tashir. Smbat ruled Gugark for fourteen years, from 958 to 972. After becoming king, Smbat appointed his younger brother Gurgen, also known as Gurgen-Derenik, as governor of Tashir.

Under the first Bagratid kings, Ashot the Great and Smbat the Martyr, northern Armenia—specifically Lori and Tashir—was run by administrators who weren’t part of the royal family and had no blood ties to the dynasty. They were handpicked by the king in Ani through direct royal decrees.

Over time, though, giving these local governors so much leeway sparked open separatist ambitions. In a feudal system where royal power was already fragile, that was a serious threat. King Ashot III the Merciful (r. 953–977) saw this coming. Wanting to crush the growing independence of the entrenched nobility in such a strategically vital region, he stripped them of their power. In 972, Ashot fired the local governor and put his eldest son, Smbat, in charge. Smbat had been co-ruling with his father since 958. When Ashot died in 977 and Smbat took the throne alone, he handed his old post over to his younger brother, Gurgen (also known in some sources as Derenik). That move kicked off the hereditary rule of the Kyurikians—a junior branch of the Bagratid dynasty—across northern Armenia, especially in Lori.

With that, Gurgen I became the first king of the vassal Kingdom of Tashir-Dzoraget. Historians still debate the exact year he was crowned, which leaves the precise founding date of the kingdom up in the air. The Principality of Lori was established sometime after Ashot the Merciful's death in 977. By 979, Smbat had anointed Gurgen-Kyurike "Prince of Princes," though he didn't become king until a few years later. Mkhitar Ayrivanetsi puts the coronation in 981. Two other chroniclers who wrote about this—an anonymous 12th-century historian and Vardan Vardapet—don't give a date at all. Still, the anonymous writer notes that after Ashot III died, his three sons—Smbat, Gagik, and Gurgen—"divided the kingdom into three parts out of mutual love, recognizing Smbat as the head of the family."

Writing in his Compilation of History, the 13th-century Armenian historian Vardan Areveltsi put it this way:

"He passed away in Christ in the year 425, leaving behind three sons: Smbat, Gagik, and Gurgen. That very day, his eldest son Smbat—who came to be called Tiezerakal (Master of the Universe)—took the crown. He was the one who built the great walls of Ani and laid the foundations for its Cathedral."

Interestingly, Matthew of Edessa refers to Kyurike by the title "King of Aghvank" when listing those who answered Ashot III’s call to arms during Emperor John Tzimiskes’s 974 campaign. At that point, however, the Kyurikians didn't actually hold any territory in Aghvank. Gurgen only managed to carve out an independent kingdom in Lori in 982, right after the invasion by the Sallarid emir Abu’l-Hayja earlier that same year. Looking to avoid internal strife, King Smbat Tiezerakal (Master of the Universe) smoothly recognized his brother as an "independent vassal king."

At the same time, this move pointed to the gradual weakening of central authority in the Bagratid Kingdom of Ani, which had been worn down by Arab invasions. Although Gurgen only received a small portion of his paternal inheritance, it came with strings attached: he had to remain unconditionally loyal to the central crown and accept his older brother, the King of Armenia, as his suzerain.

The realm ruled by Kyurike I stretched from the Pambak and Aghstev valleys all the way to the outskirts of the Georgian capital of Tiflis, taking in the Tsaghkunyats mountain range and Nig, as far as the town of Kasagh. It bordered the Kingdom of Georgia and the Arab Emirate of Tiflis to the north, the Pahlavuni principality to the south, the Armenian districts held by the Shaddadids to the east, and the core lands of the Ani Bagratids to the west. The Bagratid Kingdom of Armenia, represented by King Smbat II, officially recognized the borders of the Kingdom of Tashir-Dzoraget in 979 through a royal decree issued during a visit to Sanahin Monastery.

Medieval Armenian monasteries and churches of the 10th–13th centuries that rose across the Kingdom of Tashir-Dzoraget (Lori).

The earliest structure of the Haghpat monastic complex, the Church of Surb Nshan (Holy Sign), was founded in 976 by King Ashot the Merciful and Queen Khosrovanuysh for the longevity and well-being of their sons, Kyurike and Smbat. Its founding abbot was Simeon, who oversaw the church’s construction alongside the priest Tiranun and established the monastery’s theological school. In the first quarter of the 11th century, two funerary chapels, the Church of Surb Grigor, and the monastery's original defensive walls were built adjacent to the northern wall of Surb Nshan. A library was also added in the 11th century, its original wooden roof later replaced with stone.

The first church of the Sanahin monastic complex, Surb Astvatsatsin (Holy Mother of God), was built in the 930s–940s during the reign of Abas I Bagratuni. In 966, Ashot III the Merciful and Queen Khosrovanuysh built the Church of Surb Amenaprkich (Holy Redeemer)—likewise dedicated to the longevity of their sons—and established a monastic brotherhood along with an academy of higher learning, inviting clergy, scholarly vardapets [archimandrites], and scribes to join. The founding abbot was Polikarp. In 979, by a royal decree of King Smbat II, the Sanahin complex became the episcopal see of the newly formed Kyurikian kingdom (a status it held until the mid-11th century), with Yesayi consecrated as the diocesan primate of Tashirk.

The Haghartsin monastic complex was built over the course of the 10th to 13th centuries, with historical accounts of the monastery recorded by the chronicler Kirakos Gandzaketsi. The complex flourished in the late 12th and early 13th centuries under the leadership of Khachatur Taronatsi. Mentioned by figures such as Constantine IV and Stepanos Orbelian, Haghartsin was recognized as a major educational and scholarly hub among the leading Armenian cultural centers of the High Middle Ages. It is also believed to be the final resting place of the Kyurikian royals.

Historians and chroniclers of the era have left behind very little information about Gurgen, which suggests that in the absence of external threats, he didn't take an active role in the country's broader military and political life, contenting himself instead with managing the provincial affairs of his own realm. During his reign, his de facto independence from the Kingdom of Ani remained largely nominal. Gurgen did, however, involve himself heavily in church affairs, working to align the secular borders of his kingdom with the ecclesiastical boundaries of the diocese. He also continued the construction and adornment of the Sanahin and Haghpat monastic complexes founded by his mother, Queen Khosrovanuysh. In 988, the army of Tashir-Dzoraget supported a joint military campaign led by David Curopalates of Tayk and King Bagrat III of Georgia against King Smbat of Abkhazia. Later, following the suspicious death of Smbat Tiezerakal (Master of the Universe), his middle brother Gagik I took the throne that very same day and reconfirmed both his younger brother Gurgen and his uncle, King Mushegh of Kars-Vanand, on the thrones of their respective vassal kingdoms, on the condition that they remain loyal to him.

Kyurike reigned in Tashir-Dzoraget until 989. Known for his deep piety, Gurgen willingly abdicated the throne and spent the final eight years of his life living as an ascetic at Sanahin. Upon his death, he was buried in the courtyard of Sanahin's Surb Astvatsatsin (Holy Mother of God) Church.

"Just outside, against the eastern wall of the Surb Astvatsatsin Church, lies a tombstone carved from a single, triangular block of stone. Its beauty, shape, and the faint traces of arched niches sculpted onto its surface suggest that a person of great distinction must be laid to rest here. Approaching the stone and parting the grass grown wild around it, one can read the following inscription in a corner of its face: 'This is the resting place of Gurgen, son of Ashot the Merciful.'"

History of the Kyurikian Kings of Lori, Gh. Movsisyan

Development

Following the death of Gurgen I, the crown of the Kiurikian kingdom passed to his eldest son, David, who initially co-ruled alongside his younger brother, Smbat. However, Smbat had no real involvement in state governance, as all prerogatives were exclusively reserved for David, who possessed an undeniably superior grasp of statecraft and military affairs. David Kiurikian was destined to become one of the most prominent monarchs in Armenian history. Although he inherited the throne of Tashir-Dzoraget at a relatively young age, he reigned as a formidable king. Early in his rule, he deliberately established his state's center at the northern outpost fortress of Samshvilde and set out to eliminate the existential threats looming from the north and west—specifically from the Arab Jafarid Emirate of Tiflis and its vassal Emirate of Dmanisi. Subduing these hostile neighbors was also of vital strategic importance to the central Bagratid authority, as the border of Tashir-Dzoraget served as the northern gateway to the Kingdom of Armenia. It is recorded that in the mid-990s, without engaging in major pitched battles, the Kiurikian army laid siege to Dmanisi, dealing a devastating blow to the local Arab emirate. Following this victory, the Emirate of Dmanisi was annexed to the Kingdom of Tashir-Dzoraget. Through this territorial expansion, the geographic isolation of the capital Samshvilde from the rest of the Lori kingdom's provinces was eliminated via the Samshvilde–Dmanisi road, securing the western borders. The conquest of Dmanisi reshaped the regional military-political landscape and created a new balance of power, as the defeat of the Hagarenes in Dmanisi severely strained relations between Tashir-Dzoraget and the Jafarid Emirate of Tiflis. This tension soon escalated into open warfare, during which David Kiurikian’s forces subjugated Emir Ali ibn Jafar, establishing suzerainty and political influence over the Emirate of Tiflis. According to Vardan Bardzrberdtsi, in his campaign against the Emir of Tiflis, David I relied on the military alliance of the kingdoms of Kars-Vanand and Syunik.

Struggle Against the Shaddadids and the Rebellion of the Prince of Gag

"This Kiurike was the son of David, who was the son of Gurgen, the son of Ashot the Merciful. His father David built Lore and twelve other fortresses, which are buried in Sanahin..." Excerpt from Vardan Areveltsi’s Universal History

To the east of Tashir-Dzoraget, on the right bank of the Kura River, the Kurdish Shaddadid dynasty soon established itself, launching frequent raids into royal territories. In 985, the Shaddadid throne passed to Fadl I (Patlun), who managed to reorganize his army and launch an invasion against the Kingdom of Tashir-Dzoraget in 1001. At the very outset of the campaign, however, Fadl’s forces suffered a humiliating defeat at the hands of the Kiurikians and were forced to retreat, though David Anhoghin (the Landless) was unable to capitalize on this military success to conquer new territories. Around the same time, the Kingdom of Lori became a target of internal strife when Demetre, the Prince of Gag, consumed by an obsession to usurp the throne of Tashir-Dzoraget, rose in rebellion against David Anhoghin. Prior to his revolt, Demetre had converted to Chalcedonianism and had his son consecrated as mampali of Tashir at Hnevank according to Chalcedonian rites. By adopting the Chalcedonian faith, the separatist lord of Gag hoped to win the trust of the Georgian royal court and rally the forces of Kakheti-Hereti and Abkhazia against the Kiurikians. As Stepanos Taronetsi (Asoghik) wrote in his Universal History, "he abandoned the ancestral faith of the Armenians and made the Georgians his supporting allies." David Kiurikian’s troops soon marched on Gardman and defeated Demetre in a decisive battle, after which David I stripped him of his ancestral estates and the Fortress of Gag. Demetre ultimately failed to receive military backing from Kakheti-Hereti for the simple reason that the Georgian princess Zorakrtsel was married to David, and the eastern Georgian kingdom had no desire to provoke new regional conflicts.

Rebellion Against the Bagratid Kingdom of Ani

The conquest of Dmanisi, the subjugation of the Emirate of Tiflis, the suppression of Prince Demetre’s revolt in Gardman, and his rapprochement with the Kingdom of Kakheti-Hereti emboldened David Kiurikian to aspire toward full independence and supreme central authority over Armenia. To fulfill this ambition, David I began reorganizing his army and advancing southward in preparation for major military operations. However, the Bagratid King Gagik I soon uncovered David’s intentions and, in the winter of 1001, marched into the Kingdom of Tashir-Dzoraget at the head of a massive army. The royal Bagratid forces invaded Tashir and surrounded Samshvilde without meeting any resistance; Gagik I then devastated the Georgian plain before descending into Aghstev via the Fortress of Gag. Over the course of a three-month campaign, Gagik I succeeded in crushing the separatist aspirations of the rebellious King of Lori and firmly re-establishing Tashir-Dzoraget among his vassal kingdoms. Realizing his inability to withstand the overwhelming Bagratid army, David Anhoghin continuously avoided a direct confrontation. Following Gagik’s siege of Samshvilde, the army of Tashir-Dzoraget raided Shirak, devastating King Gagik’s royal estates. Through this maneuver, David compelled Gagik I to resolve the dispute through negotiations, resulting in a meeting between the vassal king and the Armenian Shahanshah in Shirakavan. According to another account, the meeting in Shirakavan was arranged by Catholicos of All Armenians Sargis I Sevantsi at David Kiurikian’s request.

"And David, the nephew of Gagik..., having risen somewhat in disobedience against his uncle Gagik... And a covenant of peace was established by Lord Sargis, that David should remain in obedience as a son to a father, and Gagik should love him with paternal care." Stepanos Asoghik, Universal History

Through the mediation of Catholicos Sargis, David Anhoghin, as King of Tashir-Dzoraget, renewed his oath of fealty to the Bagratid crown and King Gagik I, "swearing to love him as a father." Nevertheless, according to Vardan Areveltsi, Gagik Bagratuni punished the Kingdom of Lori by detaching the province of Aghstevan along with the fortresses of Kayan and Kaytson, placing them under the authority of Prince Hovhannes-Smbat. While some scholars link King David’s epithet Anhoghin ("the Landless") directly to this confiscation, others categorically reject that explanation.

===== Conquest of the Kingdom of Kakheti-Hereti =====
Continuous raids by Muslim nomadic tribes united the region's Christian states around a common purpose, thereby strengthening Armenian-Georgian relations. Nevertheless, just like Tashir-Dzoraget and the Kingdom of Ani, Kakheti-Hereti and Abkhazia were driven by the ambition to unify their ancestral lands under their own banner. The Bagratids, for their part, also harbored claims over Georgia—a policy vividly reflected in the actions of King David Anhoghin. Out of diplomatic considerations, David married Zorakrtsel, the daughter of David, the Chorepiscopus of Kakheti.

In 1037, the childless ruler Kvirike III passed away, and the throne of Kakheti-Hereti passed to his nephew Gagik, one of David Anhoghin’s sons. Through this event, the hereditary rule of the junior branch of the Kiurikian dynasty was established in the eastern Georgian kingdom of Kakheti-Hereti, naturally bringing it within the sphere of political influence of the Kingdom of Tashir-Dzoraget.

These pivotal developments ran counter to the interests of King Bagrat IV of Abkhazia, who was consumed by the aspiration of creating a unified pan-Georgian state, prompting him to shift his stance toward the Armenian kingdom. This change became unmistakably clear in 1040, when the new Shaddadid emir, Abu'l-Aswar ibn Fadl, invaded the Kingdom of Lori from the direction of Ganja with a massive army, while Bagrat IV adopted a neutral position. The Kiurikian dynasty ruled in eastern Georgia until 1103, after which the crown passed to David IV the Builder.

Struggle Against the Emirate of Ganja

Following the rebellion of David I Kiurikian, both Bagratid Armenia and the Kingdom of Tashir-Dzoraget found themselves in simultaneously disadvantageous positions in the region. To protect his realm from external threats, David Kiurikian carried out military reforms and reinforced his armed forces. In 1020, Gagik I Bagratuni died, and after his passing, the Bagratid crown and authority were divided between his two sons: Ashot, reigning as Ashot IV the Brave, and Hovhannes-Smbat. Prior to this, Ashot had rebelled against Hovhannes-Smbat—who had inherited the throne by right of primogeniture—and, with the help of King Senekerim Artsruni of Vaspurakan, managed to besiege Ani. Following this partition, the Kingdom of Tashir-Dzoraget came de jure under the control of King Ashot IV, though the latter was unable to exert any influence over the foreign policy orientation of the Kingdom of Lori. In 1039, Ashot the Brave died, and Hovhannes-Smbat (Smbat III) once again assumed sole rule. Meanwhile, Emir Fadl (Patlun) of Ganja also built a battle-ready army with the aim of subjugating the Christians of the region. In his Universal History, the chronicler Vardan Areveltsi described the growing power of the Emir of Ganja as follows:

"...he rules over Khachen, Goroz, and the Sevordik, and wages war against Gagik, King of Dzoraget, and against Kvirike, King of the Aghuans, and against Bagrat, King of the Georgians, and oppresses them." Vardan Areveltsi, Universal History

There is a certain degree of confusion in Vardan Vardapet’s account: the chronicler mistook King David Anhoghin for his son Gagik I, who later became King of Kakheti. As for Kvirike, King of the Aghuans, he was Kvirike III, King of Kakheti-Hereti—David’s brother-in-law. Emir Jafar of Tiflis also expressed his readiness to assist the joint Armenian-Georgian army against the invaders from Ganja, realizing that a Christian defeat would jeopardize the survival of his own state. In 1031, the allied forces took the offensive and marched into Shirvan. At the Battle of Eklezi, Emir Fadl of Ganja suffered a humiliating defeat and was forced to retreat into the mountains. The Armenian and Georgian warriors plundered the emirate and returned home with vast spoils. In his chronicle, Leonti Mroveli wrote the following regarding the outcome of the Armenian-Georgian campaign into Shirvan: "...they put Fadl to flight and slaughtered his army, seizing plunder and countless treasures. From that time until his death, Fadl was filled with malice."

Abu'l-Aswar’s Campaign of Conquest

Even after the defeat of Fadl’s raiders, Tashir-Dzoraget was not spared from the incursions of Muslim nomads who had penetrated the region. At the same time, relations between Lori and the Kingdom of Abkhazia became strained due to a cold conflict that had erupted over Kartli. Under these geopolitical circumstances, in 1040, the new Shaddadid emir, Abu'l-Aswar, invaded northern Armenia from Arran—specifically from the direction of Ganja—commanding a multi-thousand-strong army that also included forces from Her and the Rawadids.

Like his predecessors, he sought to establish supremacy over the region’s Christian powers and become their overlord. To ward off the impending danger, David Anhoghin, the ruler of the Kingdom of Lori—which was the primary target of the invasion—took decisive measures, demanding military assistance from Hovhannes-Smbat Bagratuni’s royal guard in Ani. Otherwise, David Anhoghin threatened to capitulate and surrender Armenia’s northern border to the nomadic invaders, a scenario that would have posed an immediate existential threat to the Kingdom of Ani as well. Seeing the gluttonous king’s indifference to the matter, David Kiurikian went so far as to threaten to ally himself with the Shaddadids and lay siege to Shirak. Convinced that David Anhoghin had nothing left to lose and was dead serious, Hovhannes-Smbat not only dispatched auxiliary troops to the borderland kingdom of Tashir-Dzoraget, but also compelled King Smbat I of Syunik—whose provinces of Tsghuk and Baghk were likewise threatened by Abu'l-Aswar’s devastation—to do the same. Through flexible diplomatic maneuvering, King Bagrat IV of Abkhazia also agreed to fight in support of the Kingdom of Lori’s rear. Seeking to lend the struggle against the Muslim enemy a religious and nationwide character, King David appealed to Catholicos Hovsep of Aghuank, through whose active efforts the entire clergy of Armenian Aghuank and thousands of ordinary people mobilized as a militia joined the fight. In the battle that followed the mobilization, the numerically superior army of Her, the Rawadids, and the Shaddadids suffered a crushing defeat, while the Christian forces liberated the occupied lands and returned home with massive spoils of war.

"Under these circumstances, the Christian army marched through the night in an attempt to catch the enemy by surprise; however, upon approaching the opposing forces at dawn, they found them already drawn up in battle formation. With a powerful, coordinated assault—striking the enemy's center head-on with heavy cavalry backed closely by heavy infantry, alongside flanking maneuvers by light infantry—the Christian army shattered the opposing force and put it to flight." Description of the Defensive Battle of Gugark

Attempt to Seize the Bagratid Throne and the Fall of Ani

In 1041, a new internal political crisis erupted in Bagratid Armenia, triggered by the deaths of Ashot the Brave and, later, Hovhannes-Smbat, who had bequeathed his ancestral lands to Byzantium. The overarching threat was the collapse of central Bagratid authority, which effectively meant the loss of statehood. Becoming the azgapet (dynastic head) of the Bagratids after Hovhannes-Smbat (as the Kiurikians were a junior branch of the Bagratid house) inspired hopes of claiming the crown of Ani by right of blood in both the pro-Western Vest Sarkis and King David Anhoghin of Lori, the latter having harbored ambitions toward that throne from the very beginning.

Following failed negotiations with the Armenian nobility, David Kiurikian decided to seize power by force of arms; that same year, the royal troops of Tashir-Dzoraget laid siege to Ani, the "city of a thousand and one churches," seat of the Bagratid dynasty and capital of Armenia. Pressing his strategic advantage, David’s armies invaded Shirak, putting the province to fire, sword, and devastation. Some chroniclers believed that the King of Lori's actions primarily served the interests of the Byzantine Empire, not ruling out the possibility of collusion between David Anhoghin and Constantine IX Monomachos. Nevertheless, David Kiurikian failed to usurp the throne of Ani, as in 1042 Catholicos Petros Getadardz anointed Ashot the Brave’s son, Gagik II, as the new King of Armenia. Driven by narrow personal ambition, David Anhoghin "cast the Christian nation into an abyss of suffering," earning the contemptuous epithet Davih ("traitor/conspirator") from chroniclers. David Anhoghin made another attempt to become King of Armenia in 1045, when Byzantine forces were already ravaging Bagratid Armenia to enforce Hovhannes-Smbat’s will. Soon, through the machinations of Catholicos Petros Getadardz and the influential prince Vest Sarkis, King Gagik II ordered the gates of Ani to be opened. Following the fall of the capital, the king was taken captive, and the kingdom's territory was annexed by Greek forces.

"And the leading citizens who resided in Ani, seeing that Gagik was detained in Greece, at times considered surrendering the city to David, and at times to the lord of Dvin, because the latter's sister was David's wife..." Matthew of Edessa, Chronicle

The Final Years of David Anhoghin’s Reign

In 1045, the Bagratid Kingdom fell, and in that very same year, David Kiurikian began ruling as an independent monarch. Following the destruction of Ani, the other vassal kingdoms—Kars-Vanand, Artsrunid Vaspurakan, and Syunik—found themselves in a similar status. The final phase of David Anhoghin’s reign was marked by bloody clashes with his increasingly powerful northern neighbor. Under Bagrat IV, the Kingdom of Abkhazia experienced a major resurgence, going so far as to undertake the unification of Georgia. This ran directly counter to the interests of the Kingdom of Lori, as kings descending from the Kiurikian house ruled over eastern Georgia. The unifying campaign of Bagrat IV of the western Georgian (Abkhazian) kingdom threatened the independence of the Kingdom of Kakheti-Hereti, which belonged to Gagik I. Initially seeking to avoid a direct confrontation with Bagrat IV, David I began supporting rebellious forces within the Kingdom of Abkhazia, specifically Liparit Baghvashi, Prince of Trialeti in Gugark.

This development, however, compelled both sides to prepare for armed conflict. In 1047, Liparit—whose assembled army included forces from Tashir-Dzoraget and Kakheti-Hereti—defeated Bagrat IV and the Georgian-Abkhazian army. Notably, according to medieval chronicle accounts, Vikings (Varangians) also fought in Bagrat’s army. The Armenians temporarily succeeded in maintaining suzerainty over the eastern Georgian lands. David Anhoghin’s reign in the Kingdom of Tashir-Dzoraget most likely ended in 1050. He stands as the longest-reigning monarch in Armenian history, having ruled uninterruptedly for 58 years. David Anhoghin’s body is buried in the Church of the Holy Mother of God (Surb Astvatsatsin) at Sanahin, beside his father. David Anhoghin was succeeded by his eldest son, Gurgen-Kiurike, the second bearer of that name in his dynasty. By Zorakrtsel, King David also had three other sons—Gagik, Atrnerseh, and Smbat—as well as one daughter, Hranush.

Decline and Fall

Following the death of David I Kiurikian in 1048, the throne of the Kingdom of Tashir-Dzoraget was inherited by Gurgen-Kiurike, the second of that name in his house. Kiurike ruled as an independent king, and after the conquest of the Kingdom of Kars by Byzantine troops, he became the azgapet of the Bagratid dynasty. Nevertheless, the heightened geopolitical polarization surrounding Tashir-Dzoraget posed the primary threat to the monarchy's survival, while imperial Byzantium took on the task of subjugating the remaining Armenian state entities. Consequently, in 1064, Kiurike II was forced to accept Byzantine suzerainty.

The Seljuk Invasions and the Reign of Kiurike II

Attempting to dismantle Armenia’s politico-military potential, the Byzantine Empire began levying military taxes on the population. Consequently, Armenia was effectively left to the whim of fate, providing wide opportunities for the incoming nomadic Seljuk-Turkic tribes to pillage the region with impunity. The nomadic conquerors succeeded in a short span of time in establishing the Seljuk Sultanate—one of the most powerful states in the region—which in turn posed a substantial threat to Byzantium as well. Amidst these political conditions, the Byzantine Emperor Constantine X Doukas sought allies in the most targeted region in the east and, as a token of friendship, granted Kiurike II the right to mint his own coinage. However, Kiurike was more inclined to defend his country's national interests and thus offered no open support to Byzantium.

In 1064, Alp Arslan, the successor of Tughril, launched a campaign into Armenia and Georgia. Alp Arslan began his expedition through Atropatene; shortly thereafter, the Seljuk Turks crushed the Georgian forces near the approaches of Tiflis and invaded Gugark. Prior to this, in southern Armenia, they had already conquered the ancestral domains of the Siuni dynasty and destroyed the Kingdom of Siunik. Kiurike II was compelled to surrender and accept Seljuk suzerainty. Despite the surrender of the Kingdom of Tashir-Dzoraget, the nomads continued their pillaging across northern Armenia. Aristakes Lastivertsi wrote of these events with particular horror in his chronicle, describing with profound grief the capture of the royal city of Lori.

"Troops of many nations came from Turkestan, whose steeds were as swift as eagles; their hooves were as hard as bedrock. They were heavily armed: their bows strung, their arrows ever sharp; they never untied their sandals. Reaching Armenia, they fell upon the Christians like hungry and insatiable wolves..." Aristakes Lastivertsi, History

Regarding the Seljuk invasion of the Kingdom of Vaspurakan, Tovma Artsruni wrote: "They possessed the nature of bloodthirsty beasts, terrifying in appearance, for the sight of their faces astonished and terrified beholders." Balancing diplomatic restraint, Kiurike II managed to retain his authority in Gugark and Utik. Restoring Lori, which had been damaged by the barbarians' incursions, he made it the royal residence in 1065. With external threats temporarily neutralized, he actively participated in the major events of Armenia's internal life. Subsequently, Kiurike was forced to clash with his northern neighbor, the Kingdom of Abkhazia, which was experiencing a golden age under the rule of Bagrat IV. Seeking to counter Tashir-Dzoraget—which had momentarily freed itself from Seljuk devastation—Bagrat set a trap for Kiurike II and his brother Smbat in the forest of Kweshi, captured both, and nailed them to crosses. However, through the mediation of the princes of Loke and Kakavaberd, a peace was brokered whereby Lori ceded Samshvilde to the Abkhazian king in exchange for Kiurike's freedom. In 1067, two years after the incident, the king of Tashir-Dzoraget took advantage of the Abkhazian kingdom’s weakness resulting from nomadic invasions and liberated the fortress-city with his forces. Furthermore, Armenian troops ravaged the kingdom's entire borderland regions. Hoping to re-establish the Armenian Catholicosate in Ani, Kiurike supported Bishop Barsegh I Anetsi of Shirak in 1081 so that he could be consecrated as Catholicos at Haghpat Monastery. He exerted immense efforts to preserve his country's semi-independent status.

To this end, in 1089, he traveled to Khorasan and received a warm welcome from Malik-Shah. However, as subsequent events demonstrated, he was destined merely to make futile efforts toward preserving even the dependent existence and territorial integrity of his kingdom. Gurgen-Kiurike II died in 1089, becoming the last king of Tashir-Dzoraget to rule over the foundational lands of the kingdom. He was succeeded by his two sons, Abbas and David, who divided the governance of the country between themselves.

Decline and the Fall of the Kingdom

Following the acceptance of Seljuk supremacy, a period of stagnation began for the kingdom. In the wake of Kiurike II's death, his two sons, David and Abbas, ascended the throne of the Lori kingdom simultaneously. In the very first year of the brothers' reign, in 1089, the Seljuk-Turkic incursions into northern Armenia resumed, accompanied by atrocities and plunder. In 1111, the Seljuk Sultanate invaded Lori with a massive army and encountered the resistance of Abbas I's forces. Over the course of two years, the nomads conquered the entire kingdom, forcing the rulers to relocate to the eastern lands of Armenia.

Thus, in 1113, the Kingdom of Tashir-Dzoraget collapsed, though the Kiurikians continued their rule in the region of Utik. The latter soon formally surrendered their former domains to David IV the Builder (Aghmashenebeli), who, taking advantage of the Crusades, succeeded in wresting victory from the Seljuks on the battlefield and reunifying the Georgian Kingdom.

== Succession of the Kingdom of Tashir-Dzoraget ==
Following the collapse of the Kingdom of Tashir-Dzoraget, Abbas established himself in Tavush, while his brother David settled in Matsnaberd. Thus, the Bagratids of Gugark definitively retreated to Utik—specifically Shakashen and Gardman—leaving Lori, Javakhk, and Klarjeti to the Georgian Bagratids (Bagrationi). The Principality of Tavush survived for roughly three decades, from 1113 to 1145, fighting against the Emirate of Ganja throughout its entire existence. The capital and royal seat of the principality was the Fortress of Tavush (also known as the fortress of Tslik Amram). Prince Abbas, who was effectively the first and last ruler of Tavush, participated in the consecration of Catholicos Grigor I of Aghuank. Eventually, the principality was conquered by the forces of the Emir of Ganja, and Abbas withdrew to his brother's domain in Matsnaberd. Later, when the Armenian commanders of the Georgian army, Amirspasalar Zakare and Atabeg Ivane, liberated the greater part of Eastern Armenia—including the former kingdoms of Tashir-Dzoraget, Syunik, and Kars—new princes or descendants of the former royal houses were installed in those territories. A branch of the Zakarians, the Vahramians, settled in the Fortress of Gag, occupying the former domains of the Kiurikians.

Meanwhile, in the western part of the province of Utik, David II Kiurikian founded the Principality of Matsnaberd. This branch was among the feudal houses of Armenia, subject to the suzerainty of the Zakarians, and maintained political ties with neighboring principalities—namely the lords of Tavush, Haterk, and Nor Berd, as well as the Georgian Orbelis. Effectively, it comprised the eastern portion of the former Kingdom of Tashir-Dzoraget, as the western section, Lori, had been annexed to the kingdom of David the Builder. Historical records regarding the Principality of Matsnaberd during the reigns of David II’s successors, Kings Kiurike III and Abbas II, are scarce. Zakare and Ivane, the founders of the Zakarid principality, married their sister to Abbas II, thereby consolidating their own authority.

At the end of the 12th century, the Kiurikians of Nor Berd attempted to seize Matsnaberd from Aghsartan I (ruling from 1176), though without success. In 1236, during the reign of Aghsartan II, Matsnaberd was temporarily conquered by the Mongols. In the 1250s, Taghiadin participated in the Mongol campaigns; his son, Sargis, is the last known ruler of the Principality of Matsnaberd. The Kiurikians of Matsnaberd also took an active part in Armenian spiritual and cultural life—through the efforts of Abbas’s sister, Princess Mariam, the Monastery of Kobayr was founded. The Principality of Matsnaberd endured until the end of the 13th century, while the final representatives of the Kiurikian dynasty ruled in Nor Berd, recorded under the names of Vasak I and David (12th century) and Vasak II (early 13th century).

== Kiurikian dinasty ==
Name	Years	Notes
Kiurike I	982-989	Brother og Smbat II, King of Tashir Dzoraget
David Anhoghin	989-1050	Son of Kiurike I, King of Tashir Dzoraget
Kiurike II	1050-1089	Son of David Anhoghin, King of Tashir Dzoraget
Abas I	1089-1113	Son of Kiurike II, King of Tashir Dzoraget
	1113-1145	Trout of Tavush
David II	1089-1113	Son of Kiurike II, King of Tashir Dzoraget
	1113-1145	Trout of Matsnaberd
Kiurike III	1145-1170	Trout of Matsnaberd
Abas II	1170-1176	Trout of Matsnaberd
Aghsartan I	1176-	Trout of Matsnaberd
Aghsartan II		Trout of Matsnaberd
Taghiadin I		Trout of Matsnaberd
Sargis I		Trout of Matsnaberd

== Gallery ==
Map of Kingdom of Tashir-Dzoraget.

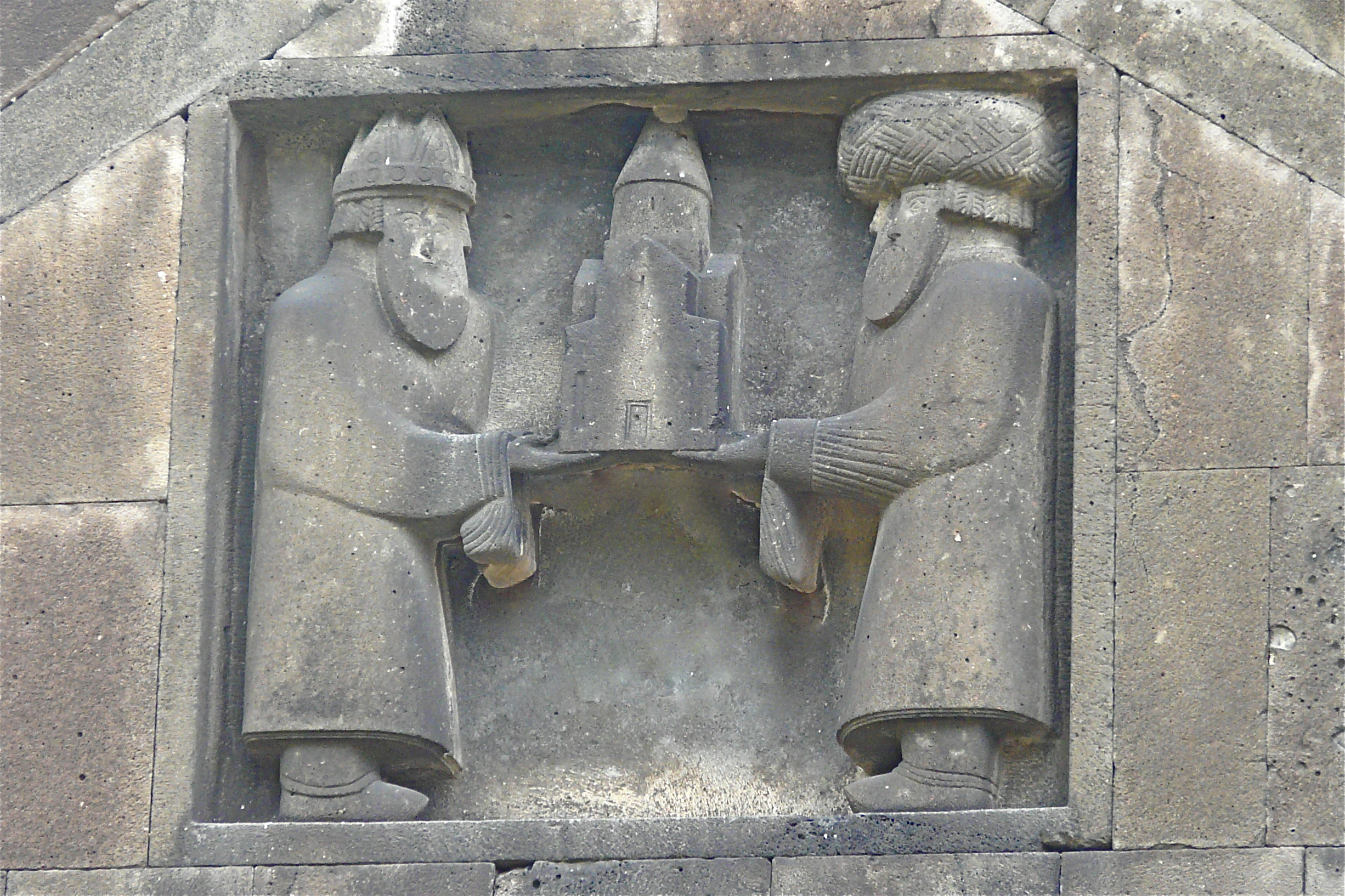
Smbat II and his brother Kiurike I depicted at the entrance to Haghpat Monastery.

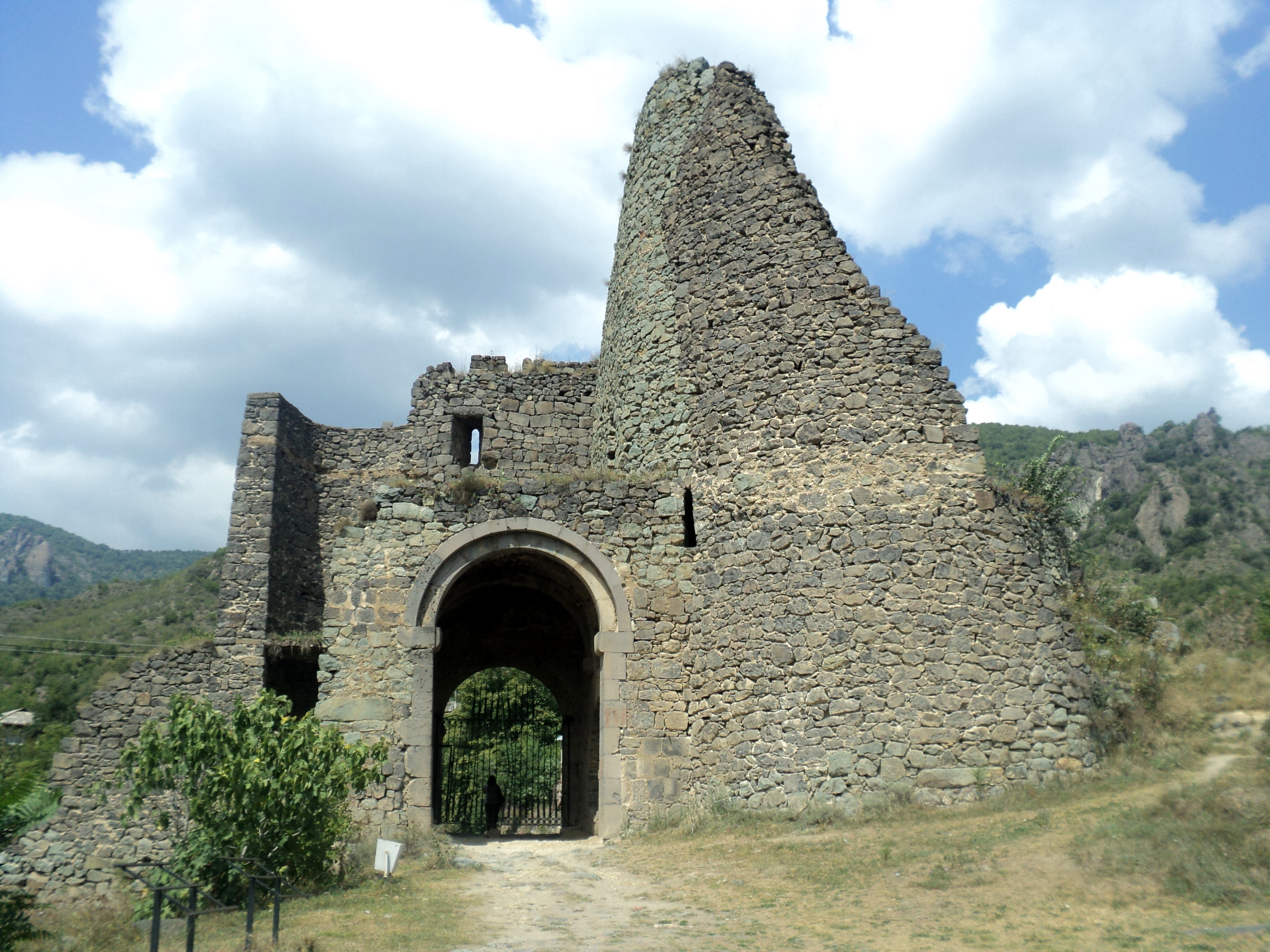
Akhtala fortress, built by the Kiurikians at the end of the 10th century.

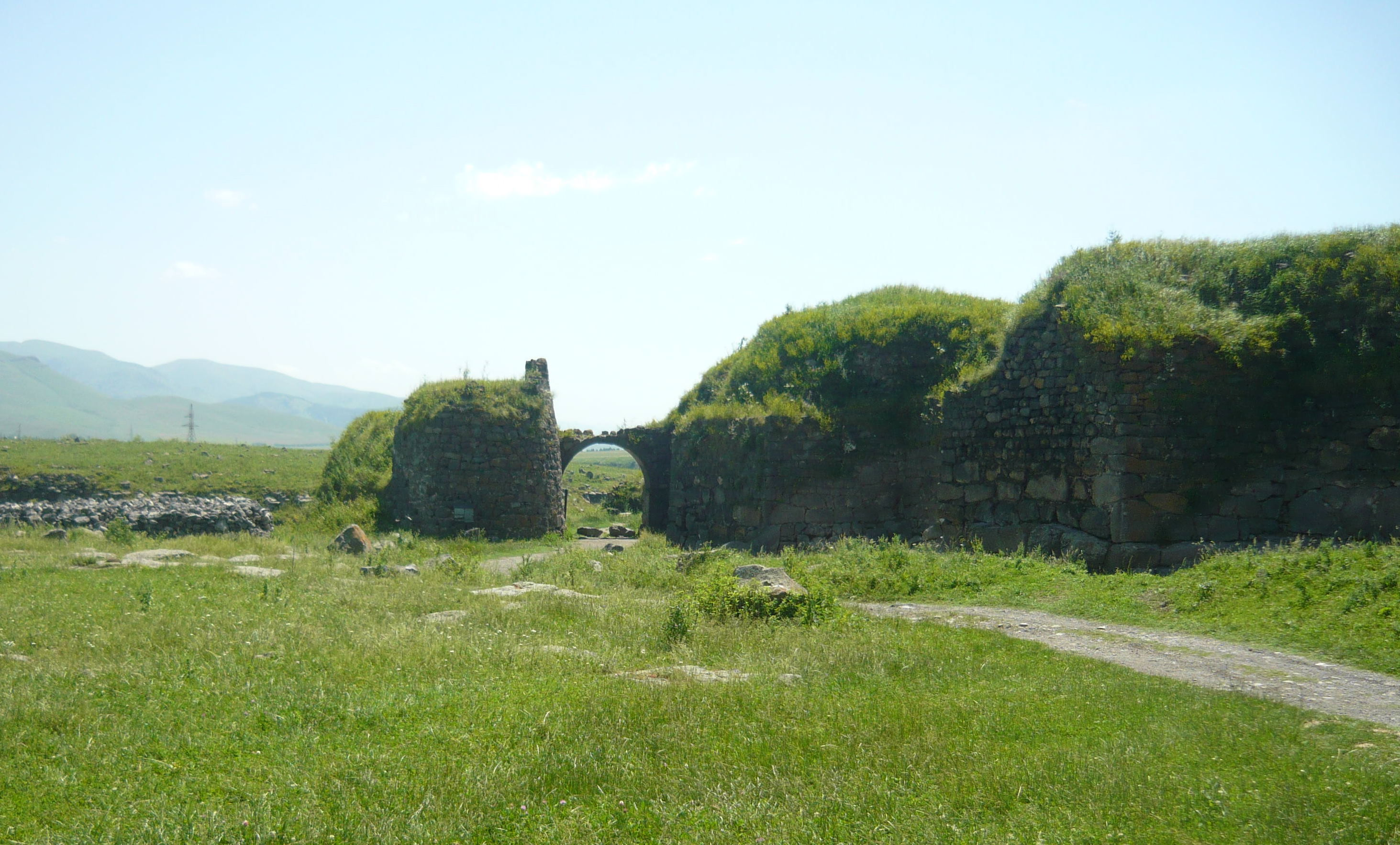
Lori, the 2nd capital of the kingdom.

== See also ==
- Bagratid Armenia
- Gugark

== Sources ==
- Արտաշես Շահնազարյան «Տաշիր-Ձորագետի Կյուրիկյան թագավորության առաջացաումն ու հզորացումը»
- Ստեփանոս Տարոնեցի (Ասողիկ), Պատմութիւն տիեզերական, ՍՊԲ, 1885։
- Մատթեոս Ուռհայեցի, Ժամանակագրություն, Վաղարշապատ,1898։
- Արիստակես Լաստիվերցի, Պատմություն, Երևան, 1663։
- «Լօռիի Կիւրիկեան թագաւորներու պատմութիւնը», Ղևոնդ Մովսիսյան, Վիեննա, 1923, էջ 24, 26-28։
- Ташир-Дзорагетское царство // Татары — Топрик. — М. : Советская энциклопедия, 1956. — С. 22. — (Большая советская энциклопедия : [в 51 т.] / гл. ред. Б. А. Введенский ; 1949—1958, т. 42).
- Toumanoff Cyrille, Les dynasties de la Caucasie chrétienne de l'Antiquité jusqu'au, 1990, Rome․
- Grousset Payot, Histoire de l’Arménie des origines à 1071, René Grousset, 1947, Rome, p. 644.
