= David II of Lori =

David II Դավիթ Բ

King of Lori
- Reign: 1089–1118
- Predecessor: Kiurike II
- Successor: position abolished
- Co-ruler: Abbas I

Prince of Matsnaberd
- Reign: 1118–1145
- Predecessor: position established
- Successor: Kiurike III
- Born: Lori Fortress
- Died: 1145
- Issue: Kiurike III
- Dynasty: Kiurikian
- Father: Kiurike II
- Religion: Christianity

David II succeeded his father to the throne of the Kingdom of Tashir-Dzoraget. He ruled with his brother Abbas I. Faced with expansion of Seljuq Turks and Bagratid Georgians, he transferred his capital to Matsnaberd in 1111, where he ruled till 1118.

The kingdom fell in 1118 which led to David and Abbas trying to keep as much territory as they could, they managed to keep Tavouch and Mastnaberd. With that, David II established the Matsnaberd Principality and ruled there as prince or lord while Abbas I ruled in Tavouch.

The principality of Tavouch fell in 1145 shortly before David's death and Abbas fled to his brother's principality where he disappears from sources.

David II died in 1145 and was succeeded by his son Kiurike III and grandson Abbas II. However, they did not have the prestige or strength of their ancestors. Upon the death of Abbas II, his sister Borin raised her son Agsartan to be heir. The family would rule the area until the 1250's, date where the last Kiurikian ruler is mentionned.

David II of Lori Kingdom of Tashir-Dzoraget Born: ? Died: after 1145
Preceded by Kiurike II	King of Lori; 1089–1118 with Abbas I	Succeeded by position abolished
