= Abbas I of Lori =

Abbas I Աբաս Ա

King of Lori
- Reign: 1089–1118
- Predecessor: Kiurike II
- Successor: position abolished
- Co-ruler: David II

Prince of Tavouch
- Reign: 1118–c.1145
- Predecessor: position established
- Successor: position abolished
- Born: Lori Fortress
- Died: after 1145
- Spouse: Queen of Vaneni
- Dynasty: Kiurikian
- Father: Kiurike II
- Religion: Christianity

Abbas I was the last king of the Tashir-Dzoraget kingdom from 1089 to 1113. He ruled alongside his brother David II after his father's death.

== Biography ==
He came from the Kyuriyan dynasty. The youngest son of king Kiurike II of Lori. After the latter's death in 1089, he divided the Tashir-Dzoraget kingdom with his older brother David II. Together with the latter, he tried to organize a defense against the Seljuks of Sultan Muhammad I.

In 1111-1113, he suffered a series of heavy defeats, as a result of which he lost almost his entire share of the kingdom. He moved his residence to the Tavush fortress, where the Tavush principality arose.

He established active cooperation with the Church of Caucasian Albania, supporting it in every way and at the same time promoting its Armenization. It is known that in 1139, Abbas I participated in the election of the Albanian Catholicos Gregory I. In 1145, he was defeated by the Eldiguzids, moving to his brother David II of Lori in Matsnaberd. His further fate is unknown.

== Sources ==
- Richard G. Hovannisian (1997). The Armenian People from Ancient to Modern Times, V. 1. New York: St. Martin's Press. p. 172.

Abbas I of Lori Kingdom of Tashir-Dzoraget Born: ? Died: after 1145
Preceded by Kiurike II	King of Lori; 1089–1118 with David II	Succeeded by position abolished
