= Principality of Tavush =

Short lived ledieval Armenian principality

Principality of Tavush Տավուշի իշխանություն
- 1118–1145
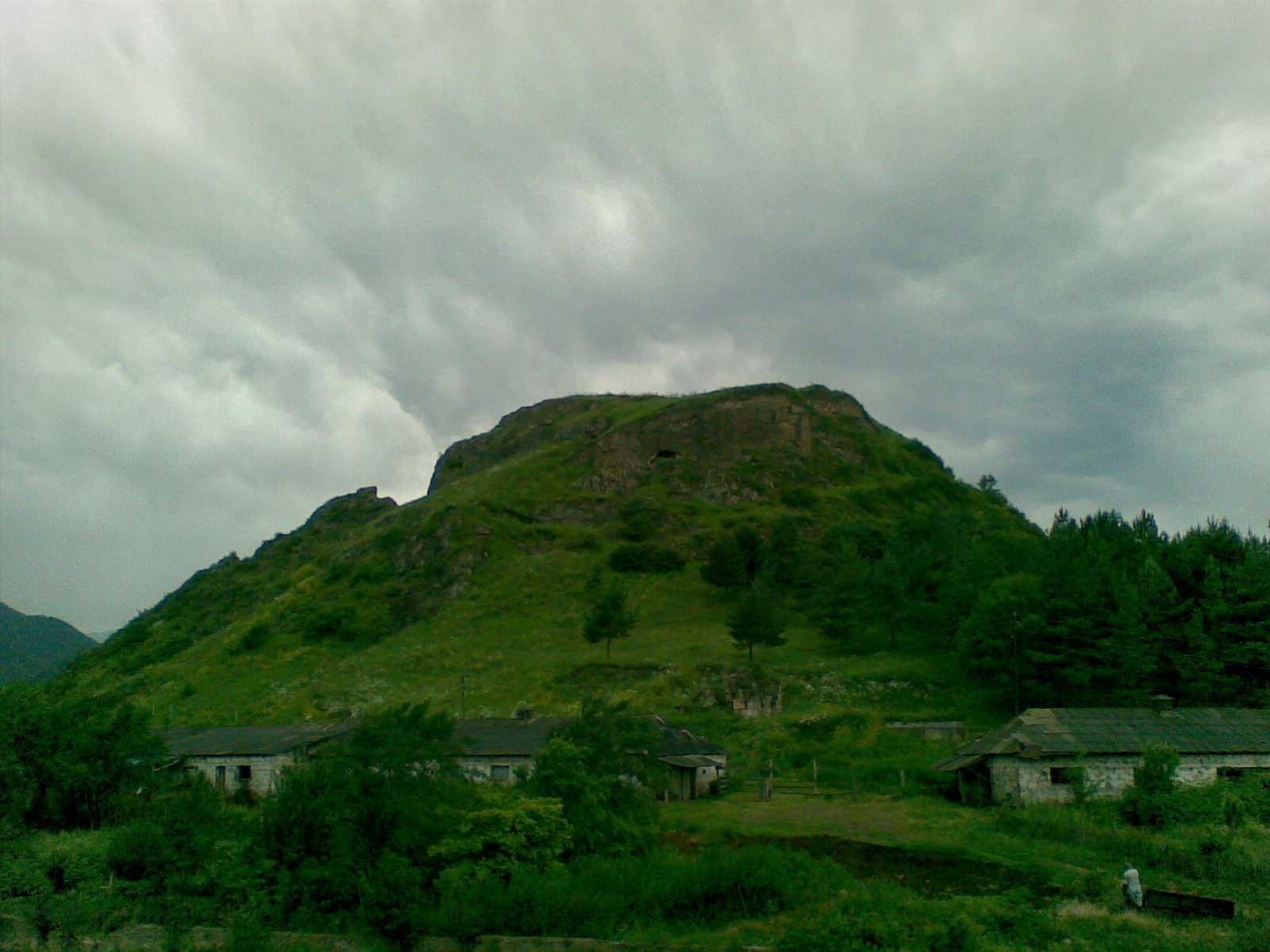
- The principality was a rump state of what was once the Kingdom of Tashir-Dzoraget, only the fortress of Tavush and its surroundings were still controlled by the Kiurikian dynasty.
- Capital: Tavush
- Common languages: Armenian
- Religion: Armenian Apostolic Church
- Government: Principality
  - 1118–1145: Abbas I (first and last)
- Historical era: Middle Ages
  - Established: 1118
  - Disestablished: 1145
Preceded by	Succeeded by
Kingdom of Tashir-Dzoraget	Eldiguzids

The Principality of Tavush (Armenian:Տավուշի իշխանություն) was an Armenian feudal principality of the Kiurikian dynasty as well as a rump state of the Kingdom of Lori. It existed to the east of the historical region of Tavush from its creation in 1118 to its fall in 1145.

== History ==
The center of the principality was the fortress of Tavush in the northeast of Armenia, transferred under the control of the Kiurikian dynasty in 966. The principality was founded by the son of Kyurike II, Abbas I, after the fall of the Kingdom of Tashir-Dzoraget. For a short period of its existence, the Tavush principality was forced to fight against the invasions of the neighboring Ganja Emirate.

The principality fell in 1145. At the end of the 12th century, one of the branches of the Kyurikyans strengthened itself in part of the historical region of Tavush, founded a new principality in the fortress of Nor-Berd, which existed until the 1230s-1240s.

As for Abbas, after his defeat in 1145 by the Eldiguzids, he fled to his brother David II in Matsnaberd. His further fate is unknown.
