= Kiurike II of Lori =

Kiurike II Դավիթ Բ
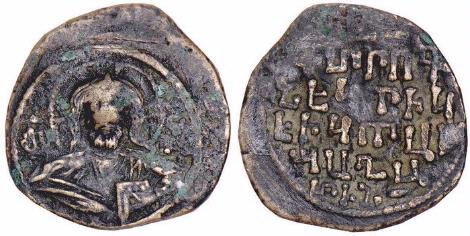
- Extremely rare coin minted by Kiurke II imitating the byzantine anonymous follis.

King of Lori
- Reign: 1048–1089
- Predecessor: David I
- Successor: David II; Abbas I
- Co-ruler: Smbat II
- Died: 1189
- Issue: David II; Abbas I a daughter
- Dynasty: Kiurikian
- Father: David I
- Mother: Zorakertel
- Religion: Christianity

Kiurike II (alternatively spelled Gorige, Korike or Gurgen) was the third king of the Kingdom of Lori. He was succeeded by his son David II.

== Biography ==
Kiurike is the son of his predecessor David I and of Zorakerstel of Kakheti.

He succeeded his father David I in 1048, but lived under constant pressure from the Seljuk Turks. During his reign, he minted coins bearing the image of Christ (imitating the Byzantine anonymous follis), but these only mentioned the title of "kouropalates" instead of that of king. Those issues are also the only known coinage from the short lived state.

In 1064, after the capture of Ani by Alp Arslan, the Seljuk sultan, Kiourikê was forced to submit to the conqueror and gave him his daughter in marriage. In 1069, shortly before his death, he was received with great pomp at the court of Malik Shah I, the new sultan, but the Turks then controlled most of Lorri.

He had two sons, David II and Abbas I. They were unable to prevent the Turks from plundering Lori and the monasteries of Haghpat and Sanahin in 1105, and abandoned their domains around 1113, taking refuge in the fortresses of Matznaberd and Berd Tavush in the northern mountains. According to an inscription at Haghpat, their last descendants disappeared in 1249.

Kiurike II of Lori Kingdom of Tashir-Dzoraget Born: ? Died: 1189
Preceded by David I Anhoghin	King of Lori; 1048–1089 with Smbat II	Succeeded by David II; Abbas I
