= Çovdar =

Çovdar or Chovdar may refer to:

- Çovdar, Dashkasan, Azerbaijan
- Çovdar, Kalbajar, Azerbaijan
