= Lori Fortress =

Armenian fortress

Lori Fortress Լոռի բերդ
- Lori Province, Armenia
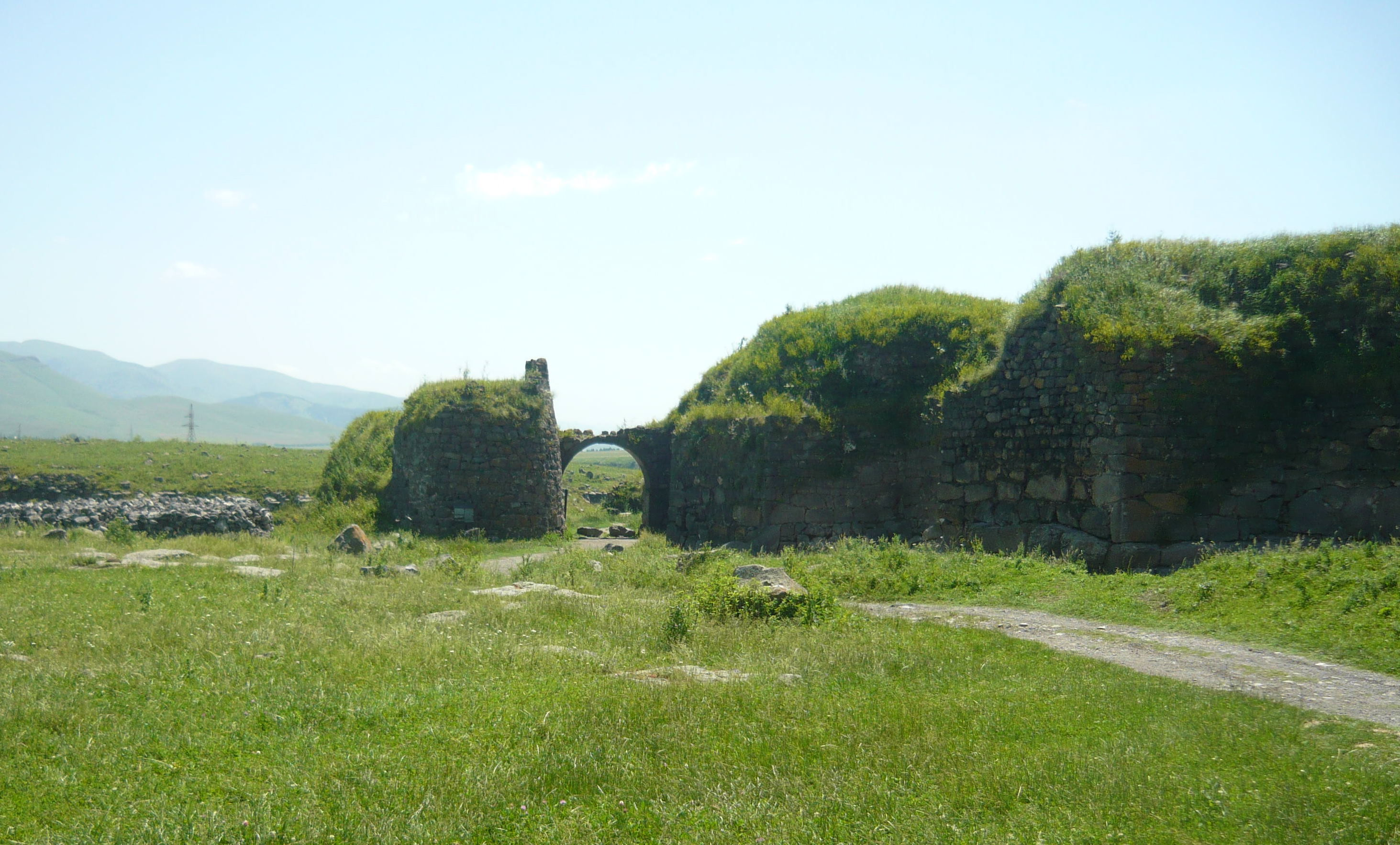
- The fortress entrance

Site information
- Type: Fortress
- Open to the public: Yes
- Condition: Some portion of the fortification walls, bath house and other buildings.

Location
- Shown within Armenia
- Coordinates: 41.002638°N 44.4312°E

Site history
- Built by: King David I Anhoghin

Lori Fortress (Armenian: Լոռի բերդ)(Georgian: ლორეს ციხე) is an 11th-century Armenian fortress located near the Lori Berd village in Lori Province, Armenia. The fortress was built by David Anhoghin to become the capital of Kingdom of Tashir-Dzoraget in 1065.

The Lori Fortress was the site where the Georgian king Giorgi III of Georgia trapped and besieged his rebellious nephew, Demna of Georgia in 1177.

The fortress was captured by the Mongol commander Chagatai the Elder in 1239.

As of 2024 there are restoration works going on to preserve the fortress. They are estimated to be finished after the several years. Fortress walls, two bath houses and a civic building which once served as a church are planned to be restored.

== Description and landmarks ==
The fortress is built out of black tuff stone and is located on a mountainous plateau situated 1490 metres above the sea level, which lies on the intersection of Urut and Dzoraget rivers. There were once approximately 10.000 inhabitants living in the fortress. The following structures are located in it:

=== Bathrooms ===
The fortress has two bathrooms, a larger one and a smaller one. They had a heat room, bathroom and a fitting room. The bathrooms also had a dome, which served for lighting and ventilation with clay pipes installed into city walls ensuring the system of water irrigation.

=== Civic house ===
The remaining civic house had a 14 x 12 layout and 5 doors. The main purpose of it remains unknown, but it was turned into the religious building later on: first into the mosque (in 14th and 15th centuries), then into the church in the 18th century.

== Gallery ==
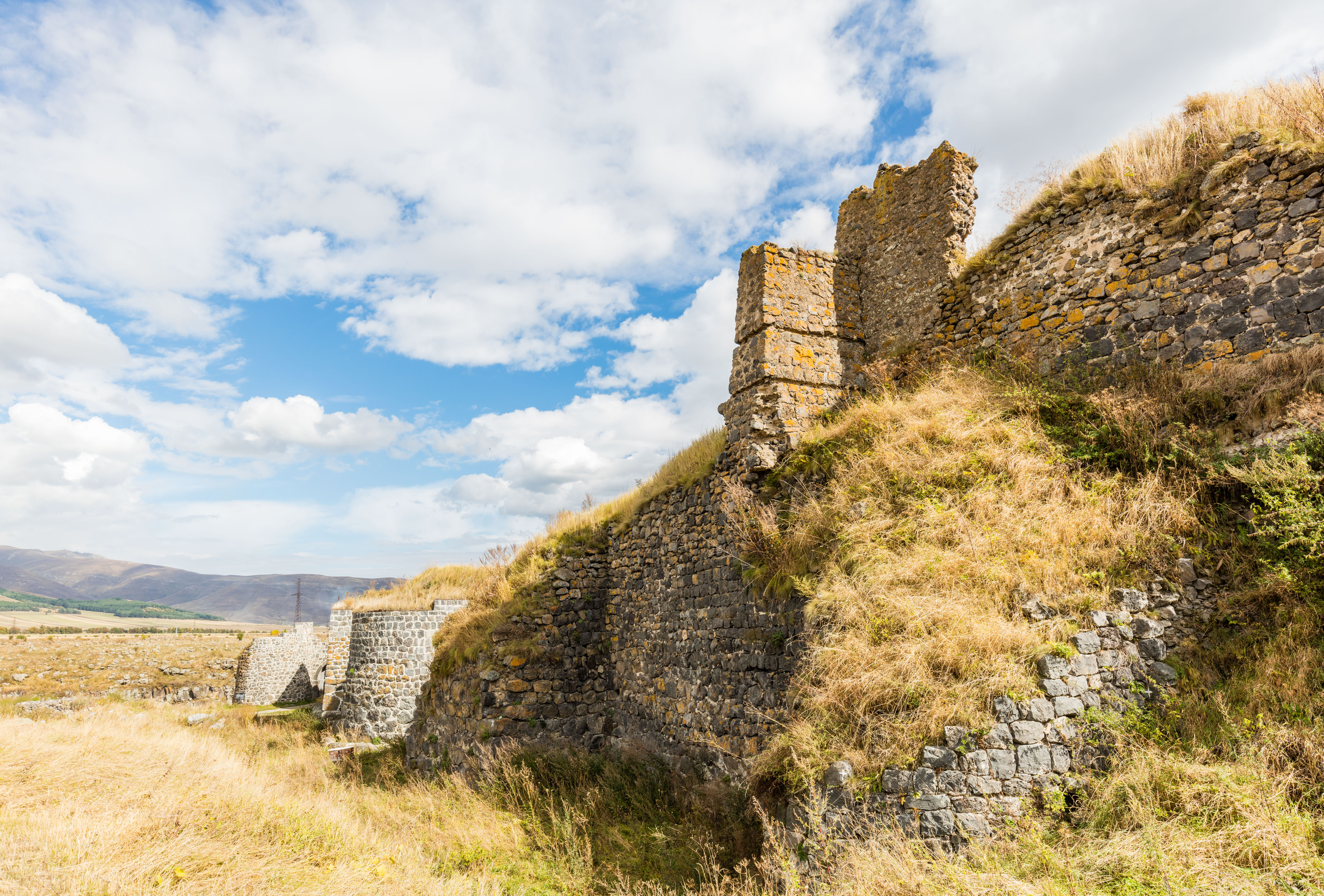
Lori Fortress view during the day

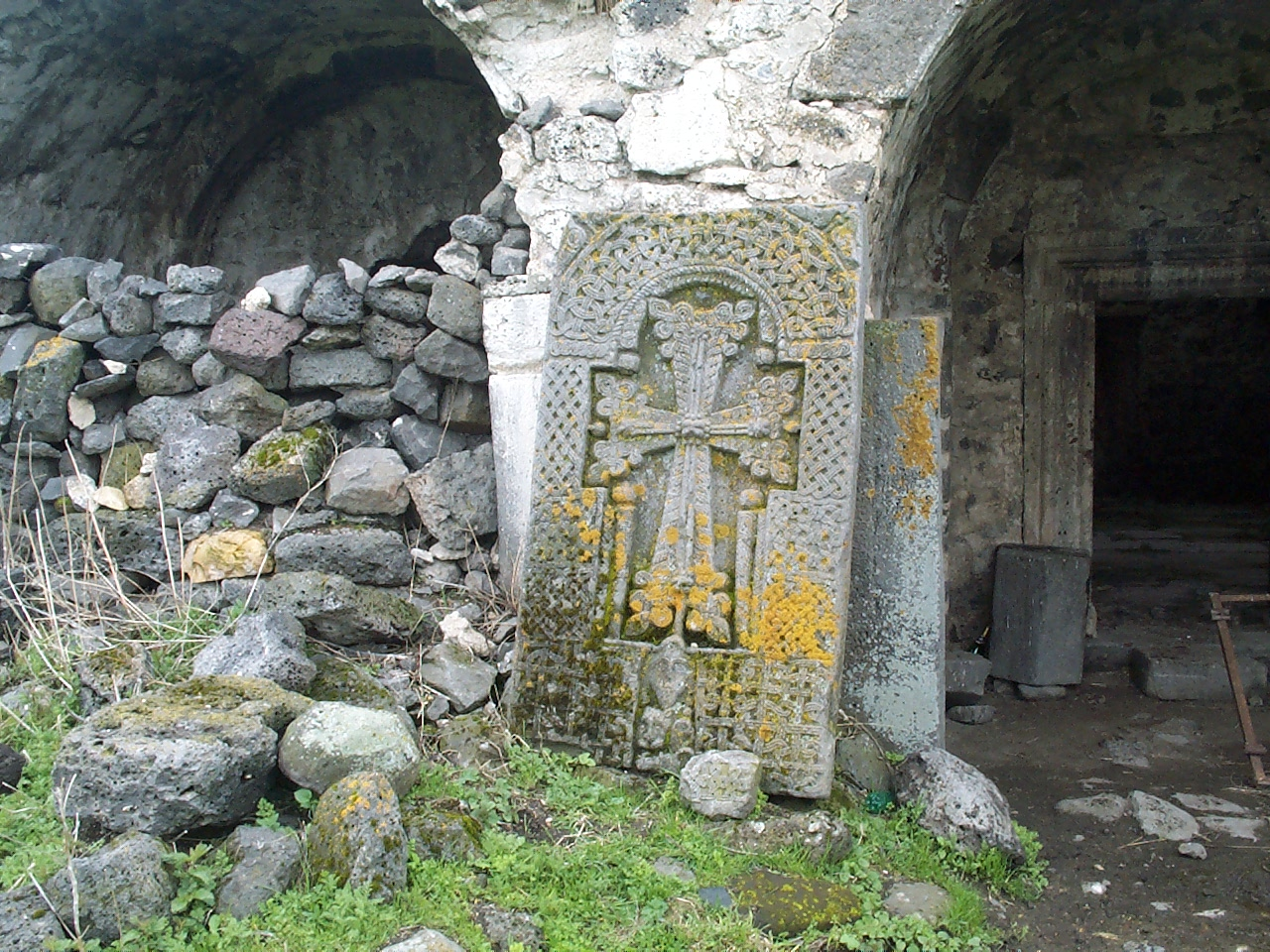
Khachkar near the Lori fortress

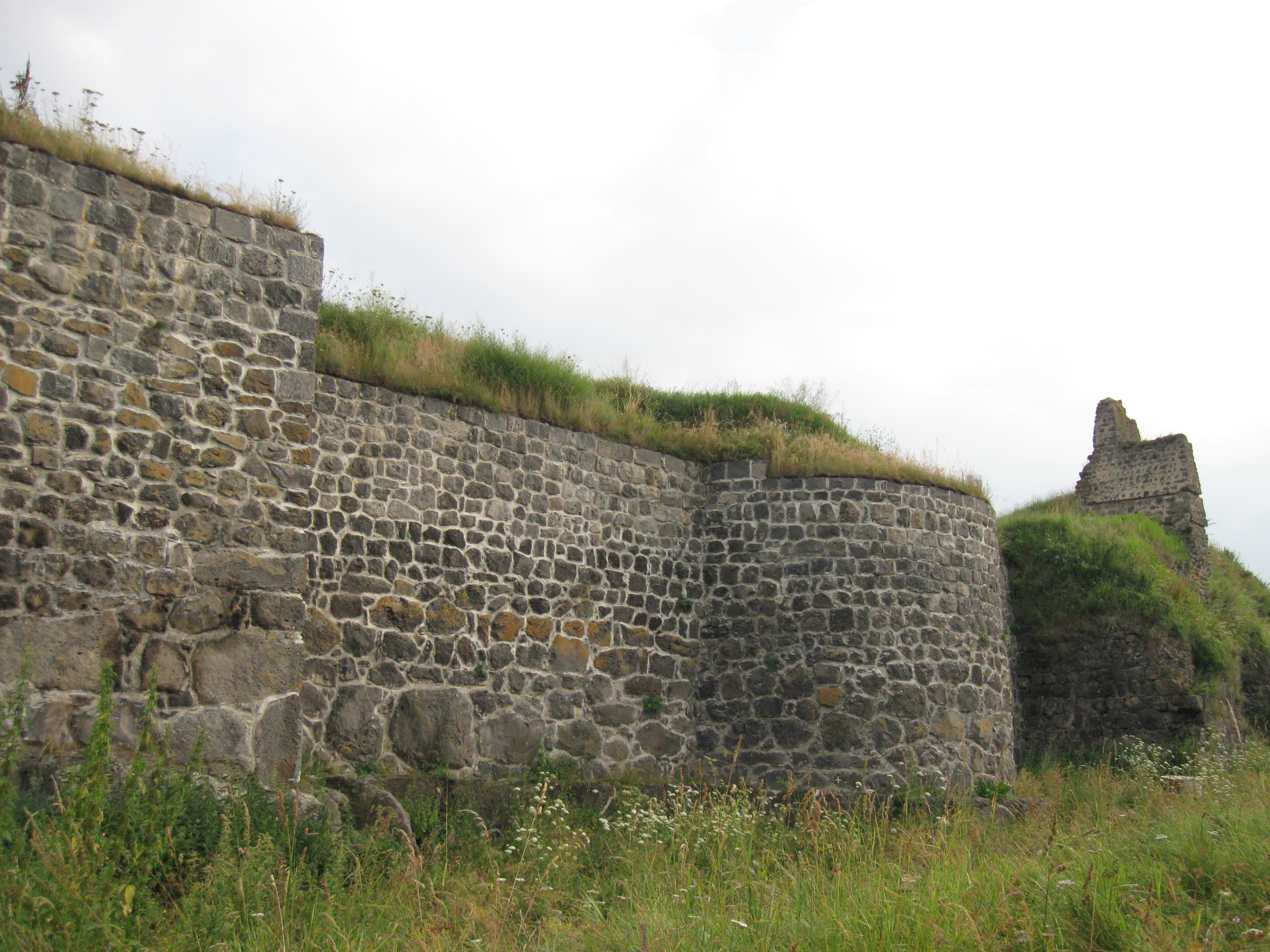
Walls of Lori fortress

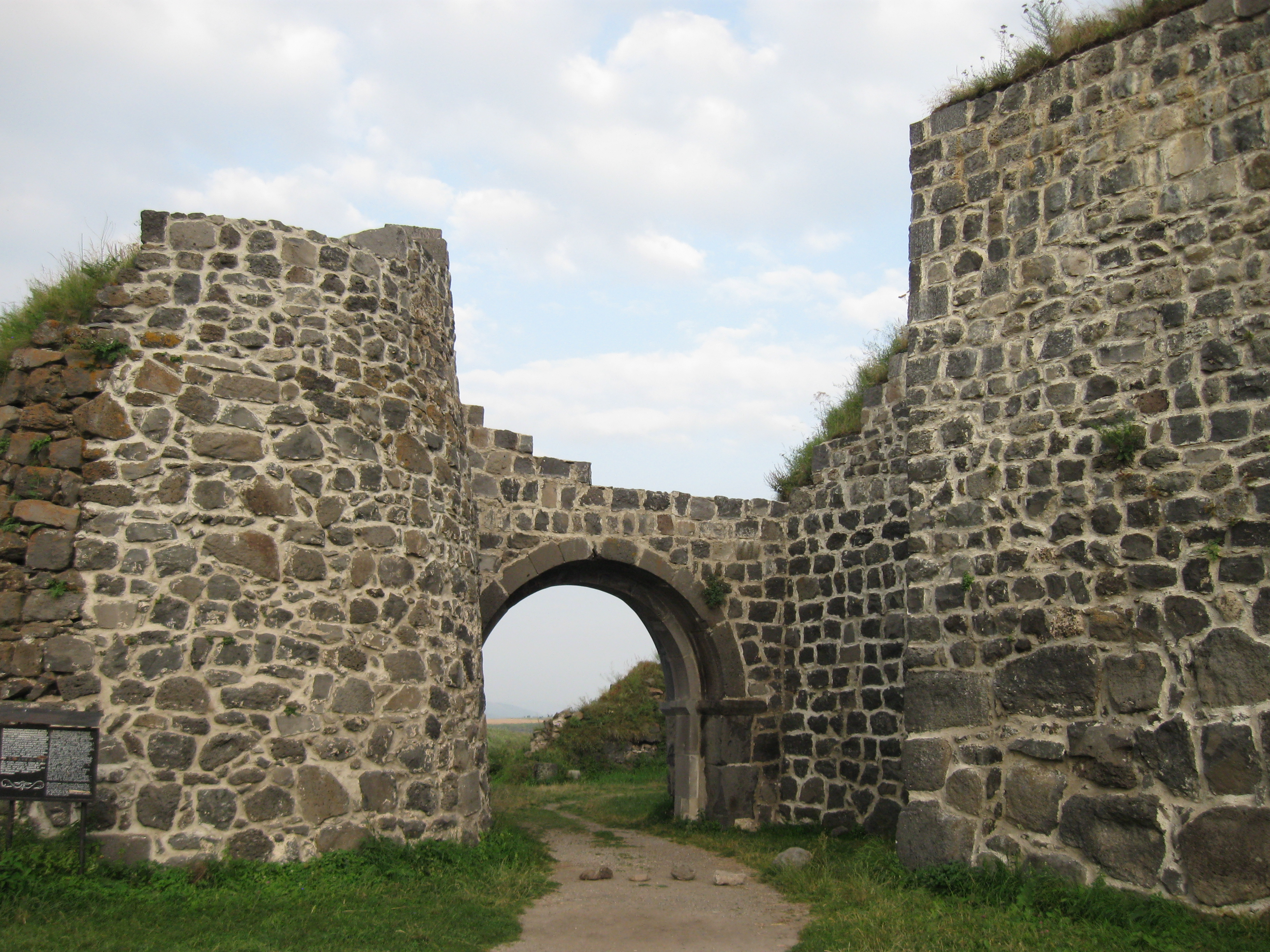
Entry in Lori fortress

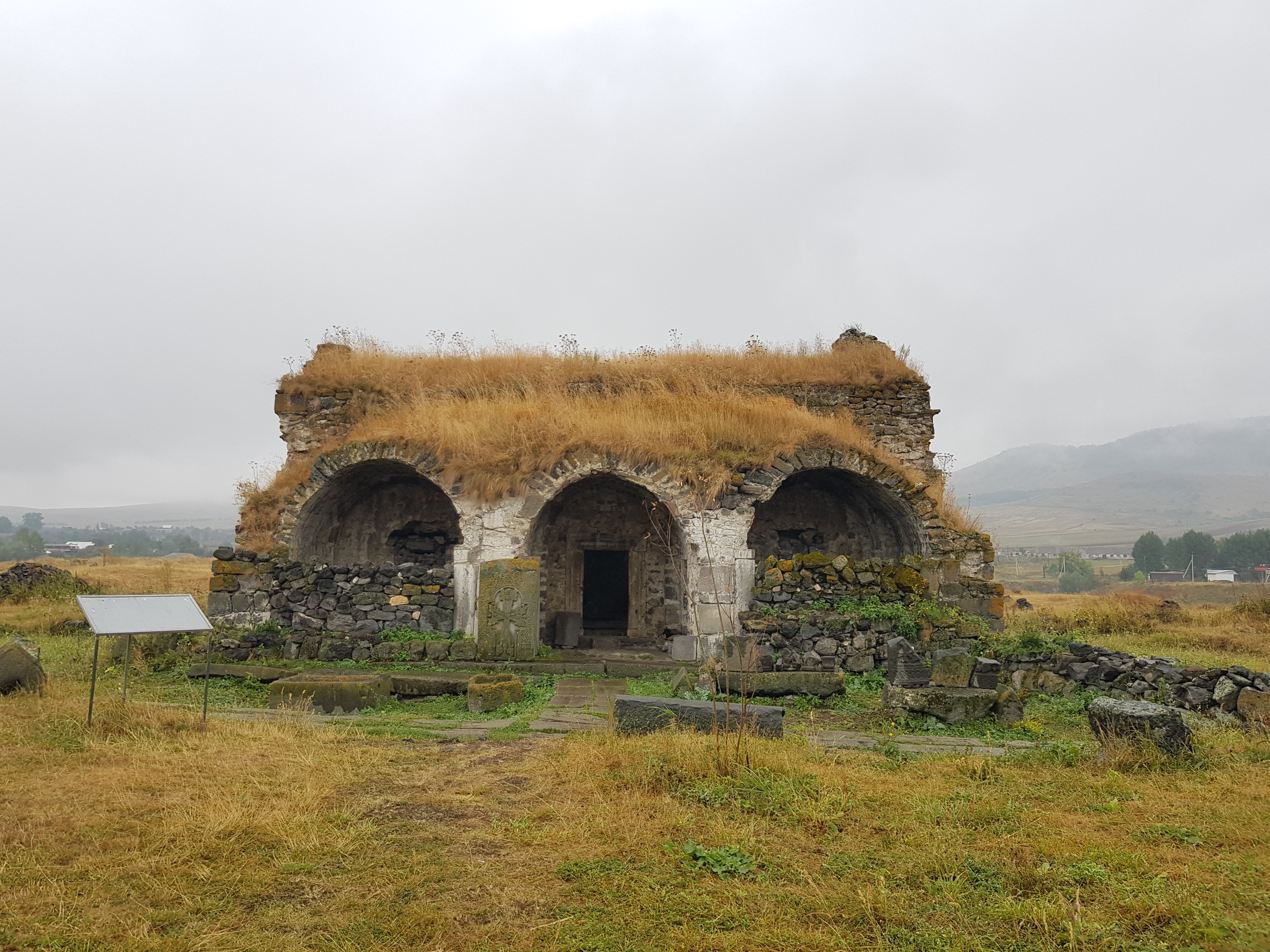

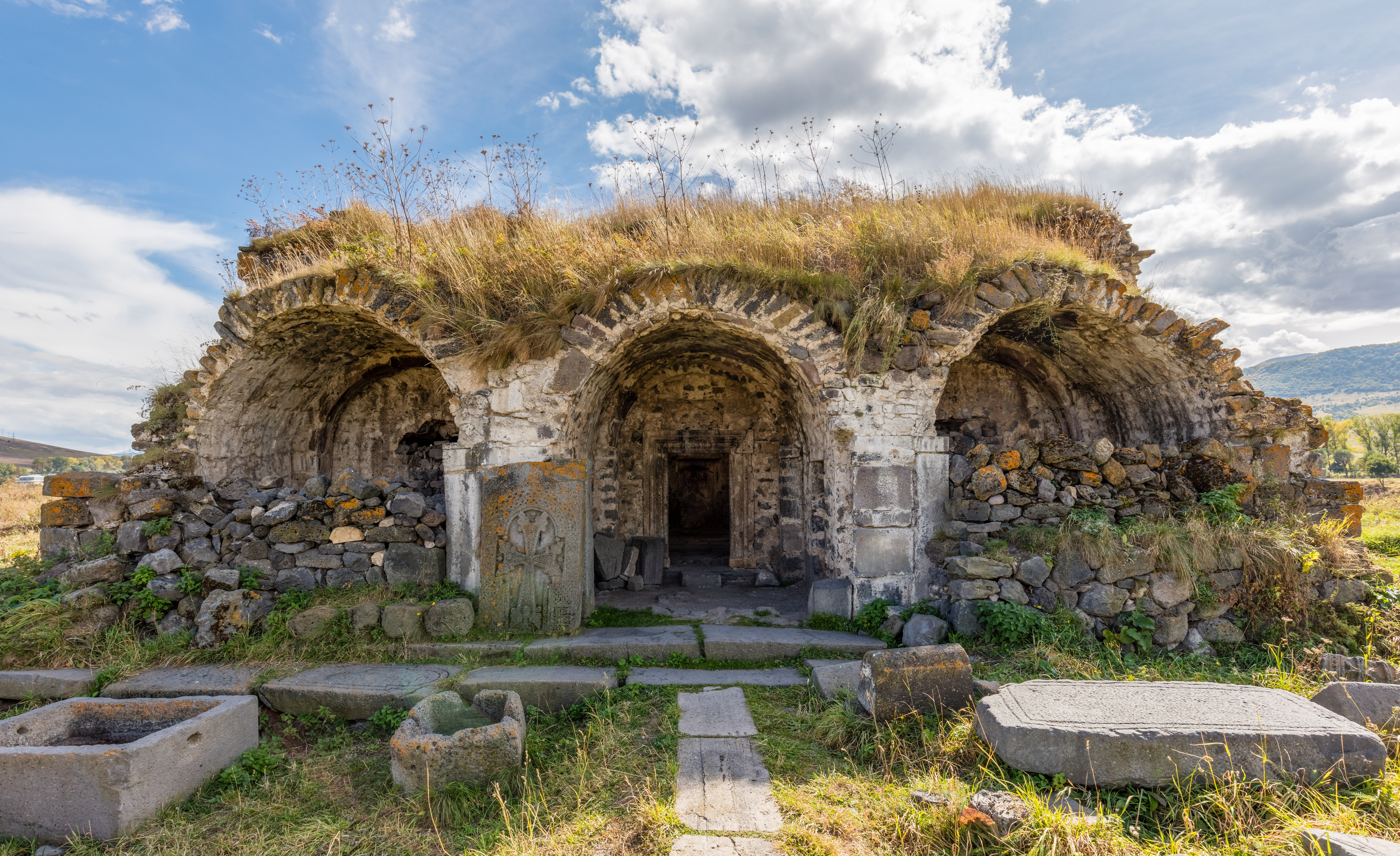
Ruined Armenian church inside the fortress

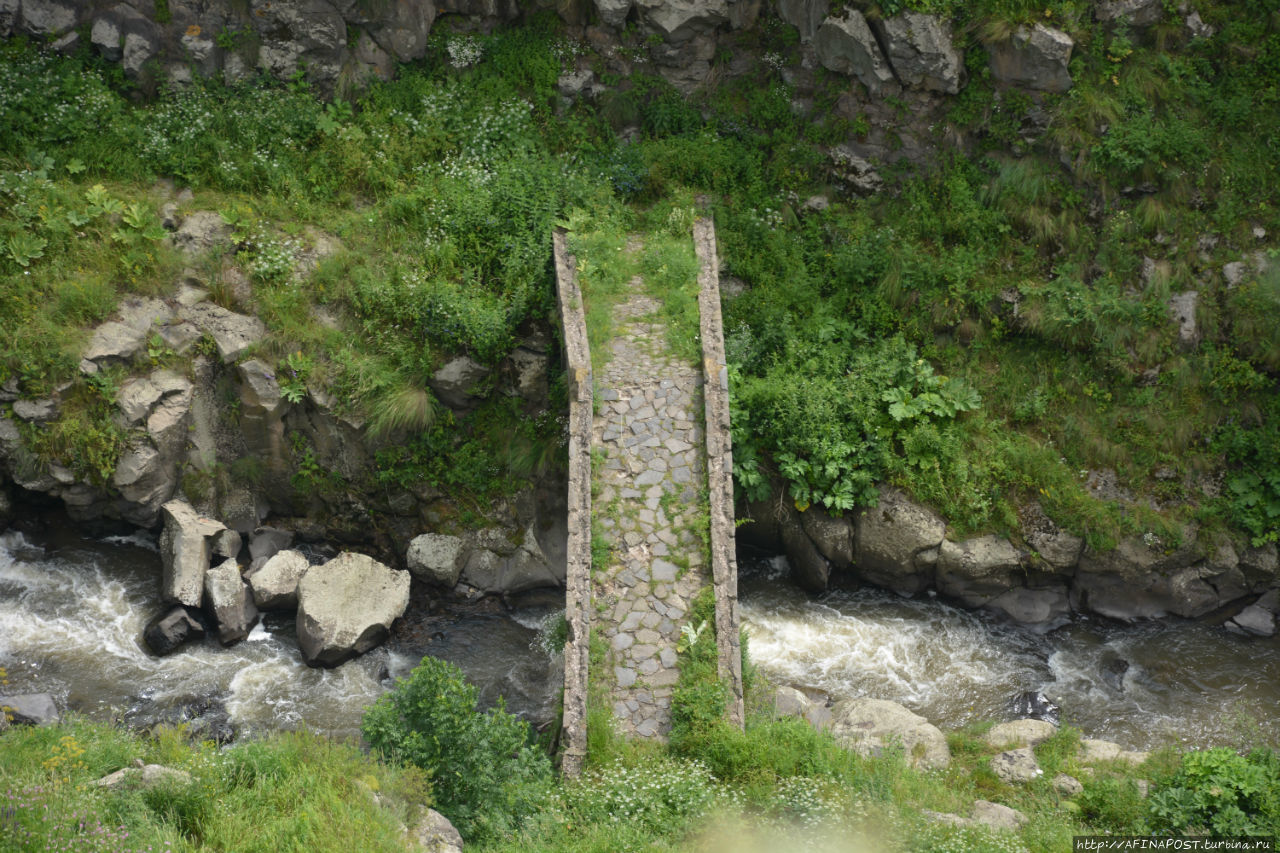
Bridge leading to the fortress

== See also ==
- Kiurikian dynasty
- Tashir-Dzoraget Kingdom
- Armenian architecture
