= Abbas II of Matsnaberd =

Armenian prince

Abbas II Աբաս Բ

Prince of Matsnaberd
- Reign: 1170–1176
- Predecessor: Kiurike III
- Successor: Aghsartan I
- Regent: Borina
- Born: 1158; Matsnaberd Principality
- Died: 1176 (aged 19)
- Spouse: Nana Zakaryan
- Issue: Aghsartan I (illegitimate)
- Dynasty: Kiurikian
- Father: Kiurike III
- Religion: Christianity

Abbas II of Matsnaberd was the third prince of Matsnaberd from 1170 to 1176; he was a member of the Kiurikian dynasty.

Son of Kyurike III, himself prince of Matsnaberd, he was the husband of Nana Zakaryan, sister of Zakare II Zakarian and Ivane I Zakarian.

== Biography ==
Abbas II was born around 1158 to the family of Prince Kiurike III of Matsnaberd. In 1170, when Abbas was still 12 years old, his father Kiurike III died, and Abbas became the ruler of Matsnaberd under the regency of his sister Borina.

In 1190, Abbas II married Nana Zakaryan, the sister of Zakare II Zakarian and Ivane I Zakarian.

However, two years later, in 1192, he died at the age of 19 of unknown causes creating a succession crisis. Under the protection of Abas's sister, Borina, his illegitimate son, Aghsartan (Armenian: Աղսարթան), inherited the throne. However, this turn of events did not please David, Prince of Nor Berd, who considered himself a direct descendant of the Bagratids and Aghsartan an impostor. David would briefly overthrow Aghsartan but wouldn't last long on the throne before the people would overthrow him as well and bring Aghsartan back on the throne.

== Sources ==
- "Dictionary of Armenian Personal Names", Hrachya Acharyan, Volume 1, List 1, Page 5
