= Kiurikian dynasty =

Armenian royal dynasty

Kiurikian Կյուրիկյաններ
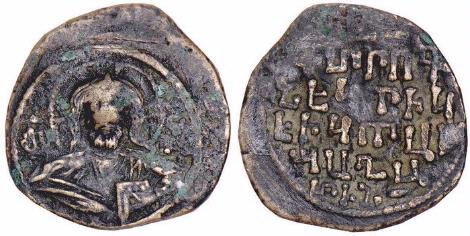
- Parent house: Bagratuni dynasty
- Country: Armenia, Georgia
- Founded: c. 970
- Founder: Kiurike I
- Titles: King of Tashir-Dzoraget; King of Kakheti-Hereti

The Kiurikian or Kiurikid dynasty (Armenian: Կյուրիկյաններ or more rarely Gurgenian, Armenian: Գուրգենյաններ) was a medieval Armenian royal dynasty which ruled the kingdoms of Tashir-Dzoraget (978-1118) and Kakheti-Hereti (1029/1038-1105). They originated as a junior branch and vassals of the Bagratid dynasty, but outlived the main branch of the dynasty after the fall of the Bagratid Kingdom of Armenia․ They became vassals of the Seljuk Turks in the second half of the 1060s. After the fall of the Kingdom of Tashir-Dzoraget to the Seljuks in the early 12th century, members of the dynasty continued to rule from their fortresses of Tavush, Matsnaberd and Nor Berd until the 13th century.

== History ==
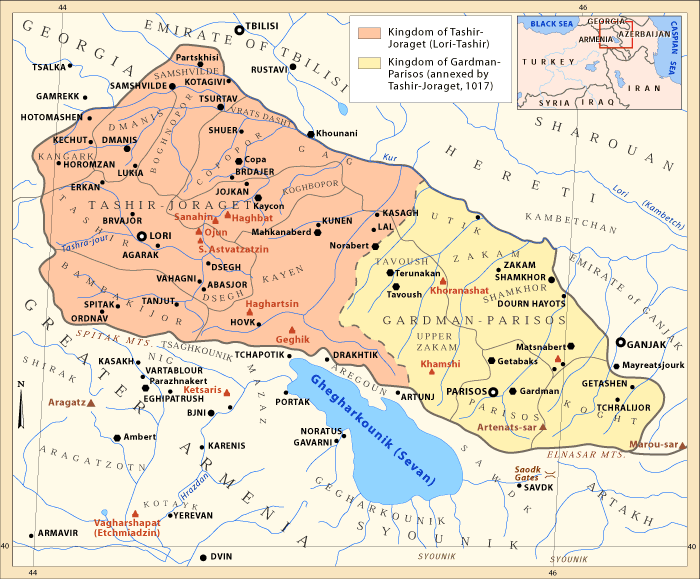
Tashir-Dzoraget, the kingdom of the Kiurikians

In the 7th century, Armenia, Georgia, and Caucasian Albania were conquered by the Arab Caliphate and incorporated into it as a single administrative-political unit—the Ostikanate of Arminiya. The Bagratunis, an influential Armenian noble family within the region, restored independent statehood two centuries later in 885. The eastern provinces of the Gugark region, mainly Tashir and Dzoropor, were part of the Bagratuni Kingdom and were ruled by appointed governors. Due to the centrifugal ambitions of these governors, the royal court soon transferred power to its own dynastic kin. Subsequently, to protect the realm's borders from internal encroachments by the Emirates of Tbilisi and Ganja, a special military-administrative region was created in Tashir-Dzoraget.

The center of the Kiurikid Kingdom was initially the Shamshulde fortress-town, and from 1065, Lore fortress (located near present-day Stepanavan, Armenia). To strengthen defense capabilities during the 10th–11th centuries, numerous fortresses were built and fortified within the kingdom—such as Kayan, Lore, Mahkanaberd, Gag, and Matsnaberd—which also guarded major trade routes. In the late 10th and early 11th centuries under David Anhoghin (David the Landless), the Kiurikid Kingdom served as a reliable bulwark for the Bagratuni Kingdom against invasions by the Shaddadid Emirs of Ganja.

Following the fall of the central Bagratuni Kingdom (1045) and later the Kingdom of Kars (1065), the Kiurikid Kingdom remained the sole surviving Bagratuni domain. In the late 11th century during the reign of Kiurike I, the Seljuks began seizing its provinces, and the Georgian Bagrationi kings ultimately annexed the remaining Kiurikid territories.

By the early 12th century, the Kiurikid Kingdom was restricted to the Tashir province. Between 1111 and 1113, the final Kiurikid rulers, Abas and David, lost Tashir as well and relocated to Tavush and Matsnaberd, establishing minor principalities. Following their demise, the Armenian commanders of the Georgian army—Zakare Amirspasalar and Ivane Atabeg—liberated most of Eastern Armenia, including the territories of Tashir-Dzoraget, Syunik, and Kars. New princes or descendants of former royal houses were established in these lands; the Vahramians, a branch of the Zakarians, settled at Gag Fortress in Tavush, a former Kiurikid stronghold.

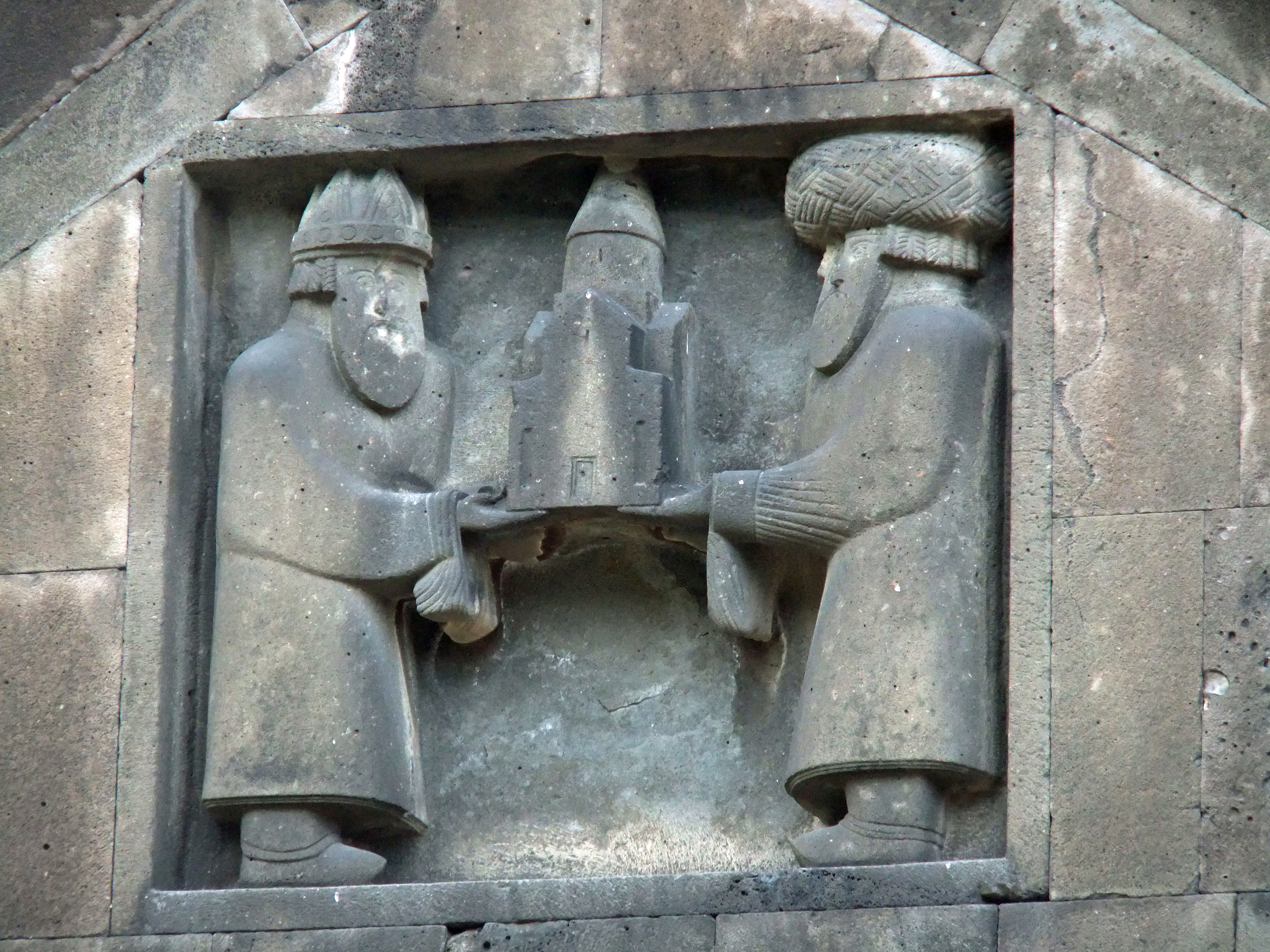
Kiurike I (on the left) and his older brother Smbat II of Armenia depicted in a sculpture at Haghpat Monastery

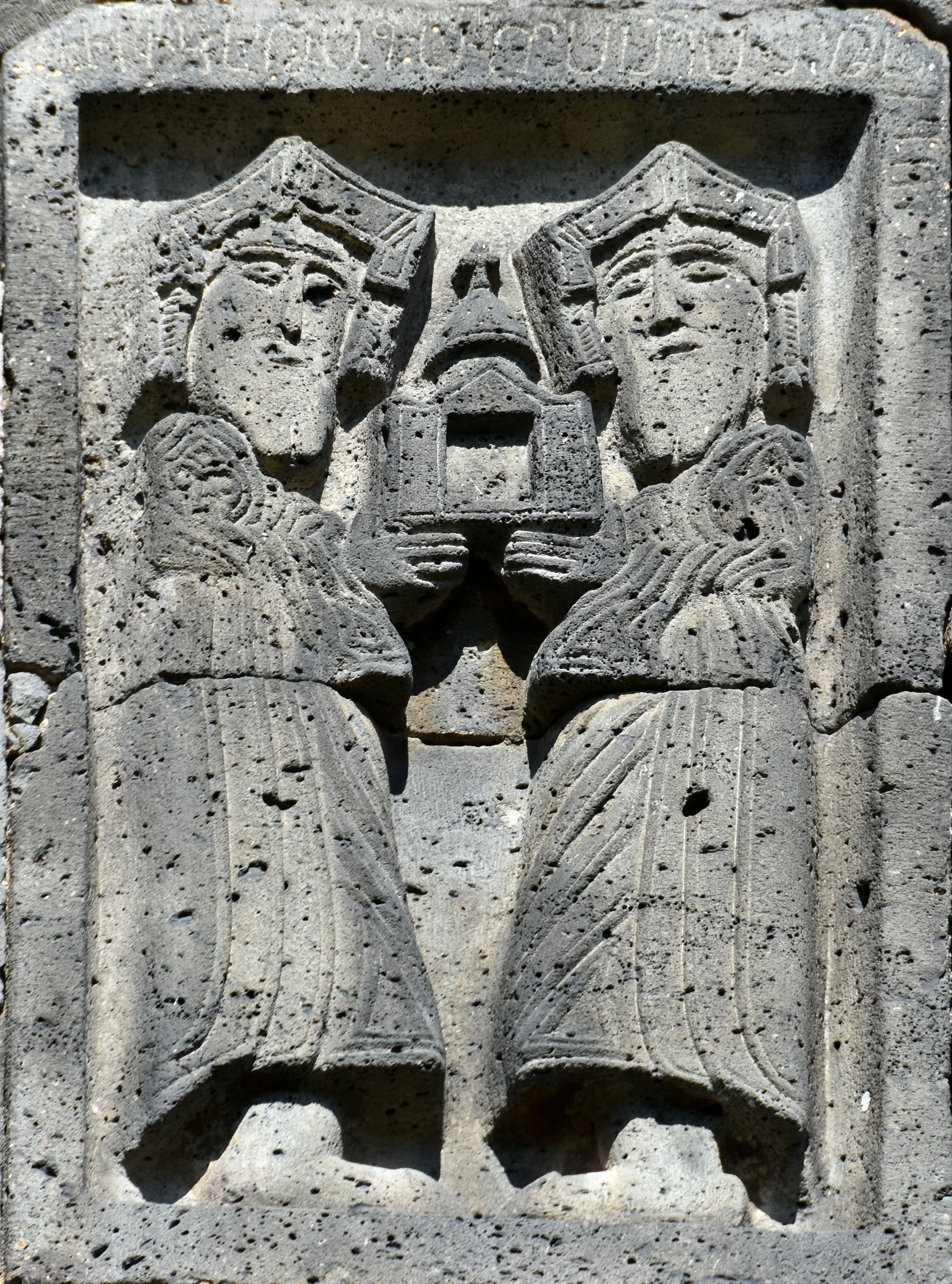
Smbat and Gurgen, as founders of the Sanahin Monastery

== Gurgen-Kiurike: Foundation of the Kingdom ==
Due to the deepening of feudal relations in Bagratuni Armenia, the growing separatist ambitions of powerful local princes, and negative external influences, the state entered a period of gradual fragmentation and decline starting in the second half of the 10th century. Political entities—local kingdoms and principalities—began to emerge, often only formally recognizing the suzerainty of the Bagratunis of Ani. Among these was the Kiurikid Kingdom of Tashir-Dzoraget. During the initial period of the Bagratuni Kingdom, Tashir was administered by appointed non-dynastic governors-overseers. However, taking into account their overt separatist tendencies and the imperative to keep this strategically vital region under reliable control through a member of the royal house, King Ashot III the Merciful (953–977) appointed his eldest son Smbat—who had been his co-ruler since at least 958—as the governor of Tashir. Smbat ruled in Gugark for 14 years, from 958 to 972. After inheriting the royal throne, Smbat installed his younger brother Gurgen (who also bore the second name Derenik) as governor in Tashir.

Gurgen I Kiurike, the younger son of Ashot III the Merciful, founded a new kingdom belonging to a junior branch of the Bagratunis subordinate to the Bagratunis of Ani. The name Kiurikian (Kiurikid) given to this local kingdom and its ruling dynasty stems from Gurgen being called "Kiurike" in the local pronunciation or dialect. The Kiurikids were dependent on the Bagratunis of Ani and received confirmation of their rights from them. In 974, Gurgen participated in a military mobilization led by Ashot III in response to the Asia Minor campaign of Byzantine Emperor John I Tzimiskes, which posed a threat to Armenia's southern borders. Although Matthew of Edessa mentions Gurgen with the title "King of Aghvank" among the participants of the 974 mobilization, this was done retroactively, as the Kiurikids did not yet possess domains in Caucasian Albania/Aghvank at that time. Furthermore, other figures mentioned by Matthew of Edessa as kings during that mobilization assumed their thrones later: Abas became King of Kars in 984, Senekerim acceded to the throne of Vaspurakan in 1003, and King Philippe of Kapan was one of the minor rulers of Artsakh.

Following the death of his father in 977, Gurgen became the de facto ruler of the region. In a 979 colophon by Simeon, scribe of Sanahin Monastery, Gurgen is still referred to as "prince of the entire land of Tashir". As a distinct administrative-political unit entrusted to Gurgen as governor by Smbat II, the region also required a corresponding ecclesiastical organization and spiritual status. Following the construction of the Holy Redeemer (Amenaprkich) Church at Sanahin Monastery in the mid-960s, Ashot III and Queen Khosrovanush granted estates to the monastery, making it the center of the Tashir province's spiritual diocese with Amenaprkich as its cathedral. By 970, Bishop Grigor led this diocese, confirmed by Simeon's 972 entry. However, the newly created administrative unit under Gurgen's governance encompassed a larger area than that previously overseen by Smbat, and the jurisdiction of the Tashir diocese did not cover all its districts. To resolve this discrepancy and fulfill Smbat II's desire to make the Holy Mother of God (Surb Astvatsatsin) Church—the ancestral burial site—the main cathedral of the newly established diocese instead of Amenaprkich, Smbat II visited Sanahin in 979 and issued a decree. Through Catholicos Khachik I, Smbat II designated the Surb Astvatsatsin Church of Sanahin as the cathedral for the church organization encompassing Gurgen's domains under the leadership of Bishop Yesayi. It included "all the land of Upper and Lower Tashir, from both sides of the Bazum Mountains to the borders of the realm of Gugark, up to the borders of Tbilisi and Georgia, to the borders of the Nig province, to the borders of Kayan, and the borders of Tsaghkotsadz up to the borders of the House of Shirak".

The establishment of the Kiurikid Kingdom was a prolonged process, and the exact date of its proclamation is debated in historiographical literature between 966 and 988. Among primary sources, only Mkhitar of Ayrivank explicitly mentions 981 as the year Gurgen became king. The other two principal medieval sources—the 12th-century Anonymous Chronicler and Vardan Vardapet—do not specify a date. According to the Anonymous Chronicler, after the death of Ashot III, his sons Smbat, Gagik, and Gurgen "divided the kingdom by mutual love, making Smbat the head of the house." Vardan Vardapet notes that Ashot III passed away "leaving three sons: Smbat, Gagik, and Gurgen; on that same day, the eldest son, Smbat, took the crown... and the youngest brother inherited Tashir with the Sevordik of Dzoroyget." On a khachkar dated 986 in the cemetery of Kurtan village, Gurgen is already referred to by the name Kiurike with the title of king. Thus, the Kiurikid Kingdom of Tashir-Dzoraget was formed after the death of Ashot III, between 979 and 985, with Mkhitar Ayrivanetsi's 981 being considered an acceptable date. Smbat II the Master of the Universe officially recognized Gurgen as king in 982.

The boundaries of the Kiurikid Kingdom stretched from the Pambak and Aghstev valleys to the vicinity of Tbilisi, the Tsaghkunyats mountain range, and the Nig province. To the north, it bordered the Georgian Bagratuni Kingdom and the Arab Emirate of Tbilisi; to the south, the domains of the Pahlavuni family; to the east, Armenian regions under the rule of the Shaddadids; and to the west, the core domains of the Bagratunis of Ani. According to the Anonymous Chronicler, Gurgen possessed "the regions of Gogarene starting from Gag, Khorai up to the gates of Tbilisi." Vardan Vardapet writes that he received "Tashir with the Sevordik of Dzoroyget, as well as Kayan, Kaitson, Khorkhorunik built in Khorai—which is Khozhorni and Khorakert—as well as Bazunik (Bazkert) in Tashir province and other famous fortresses." Mkhitar Ayrivanetsi notes: "Gurgen reigned in Georgia/Iberia and his brother Smbat in Armenia."

During the reign of Gurgen-Kiurike, the construction of the Holy Mother of God (Surb Astvatsatsin) Church in Sanahin and the Holy Sign (Surb Nshan) Church in Haghpat—initiated by their mother, Queen Khosrovanush—was completed. Gurgen-Kiurike continued the expansion and decoration of the Sanahin and Haghpat monastic complexes, as evidenced by his gift of two large, luxurious chandeliers to Sanahin Monastery. In 988, he took part in Smbat II's military movement against King Smbat of the Abkhazians in defense of David Curopalates and the Georgian King Bagrat III. Following the death of Smbat II (977/989), his middle brother, Gagik I (990–1020), ascended the throne and reconfirmed both his younger brother Gurgen and his uncle Mushegh (King of Kars-Vanand) on their respective thrones on condition of submission. Being a deeply pious and religious person, Gurgen voluntarily abdicated the throne, lived as a monk at Sanahin for eight years, and passed away around 998.

Gurgen I was buried in the royal mausoleum at the Surb Astvatsatsin Church of Sanahin Monastery. Outside, beneath the eastern wall of the church, lies a triangular monolith tombstone, carved in one corner with the inscription: "This is the resting place of Gurgen, son of Ashot the Merciful." Gurgen I had two sons, David and Smbat. Aristakes Lastivertsi also mentions a daughter of Gurgen (unnamed), who married the Emir of Dvin, Abu'l-Aswar.

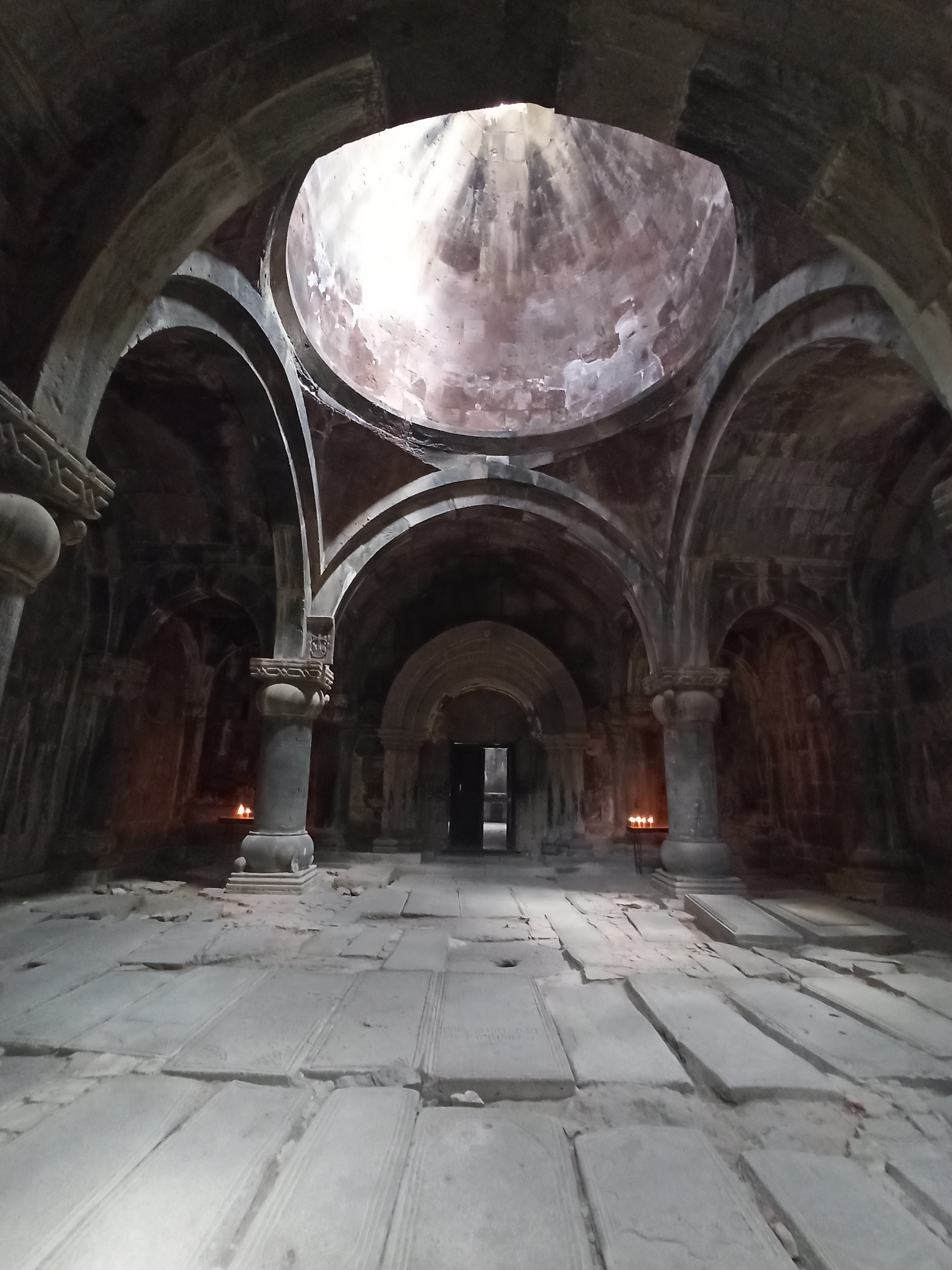
The gavit or vestibule of the Church of St. Amenaprkich in Sanahin Monastery was built in 1181 by the Kyurikian family.

== David Anhoghin: Height of the Kingdom's Power ==
In 989, David Kiurikyan, known as David Anhoghin, ascended the throne in Tashir-Dzoraget. During his long reign spanning more than half a century, the country reached the pinnacle of its power. Inheriting his father's throne at a young age did not prevent him from understanding the challenges facing his kingdom and successfully resolving them. He established the fortress-city of Shamshulde, located on the northern periphery of his realm, as the capital of his kingdom. Following this, David set out to eliminate the direct threat to his kingdom from the north and west posed by the Arab Jafarid Emirate of Tbilisi and its subordinate Emirate of Dmanisi. To this end, in the mid-990s, he swiftly captured the Emirate of Dmanisi and annexed it to his kingdom. As a result, the kingdom's territory expanded, the isolation of Shamshulde from other provinces was eliminated via the Shamshulde-Dmanisi route, and the western borders were rendered secure.

Naturally, the capture of the Emirate of Dmanisi led to a military clash between Ali ibn Jafar, Emir of Tbilisi, and David Anhoghin. David defeated and subjugated him, thereby removing a grave threat facing his kingdom—particularly Shamshulde—from the north. David also contributed to fortifying a key segment of Bagratuni Armenia's northern frontiers, a vital step above all for his kingdom's own strategic interests.Thereafter, until 1001, he was forced to confront a new and far more formidable force threatening his kingdom from the southeast: the Shaddadid Emirate of Kurdish origin, which had established itself in Ganja in the 970s. Expansionist in nature and strengthened especially under Patlun I (Fadl I, 985–1031), the emirate sought to curb the continued rise of the Kiurikid Kingdom of Tashir-Dzoraget. When Patlun I attacked David, likely along the banks of the Kura River, he suffered a humiliating defeat and barely escaped the battlefield. Although David was unable to capitalize on this victory to expand his realm into Shaddadid-controlled Armenian lands, the threat from the Shaddadids was temporarily neutralized. Afterward, David had to suppress a rebellion by Demetre, Prince of Gag and marzban, who exhibited centrifugal ambitions. As recorded by Asoghik (Stephen of Taron), having lost David's trust, Demetre "abandoned the ancestral Armenian faith and relied on Georgia for support," embracing Chalcedonism. Furthermore, after converting his son to Chalcedonism as well, he appointed him mampayl (archbishop) of Tashir at Hnevank. By adhering to Chalcedonism, Demetre was clearly seeking Georgian support for his separatist plans to break away from David. He failed, however; David expelled him from Gag, stripped him of all his fortresses and domains, and condemned him to a wandering life.

David married Zorakrtseli daughter of the last archbishop of Kakheti David 976-1010. This reality making Shamshvilde or Shamshulde located at the northern end of the kingdom his residence conquering the emirate of Dmanisi and crushing and subjugating the emirate of Tbilisi and suppressing the rebellion of marzpan Demetre evidenced that the far reaching goal of David Kiurikyan was approaching the kingdom of Kakheti if not capturing it. However two circumstances hindered that. The first of them was the strengthening of the Iberian Abkhazian kingdom having the same ambition and the second was the unsuccessful attempt of David who overestimated his own forces not to obey his uncle and suzerain Gagik I Asoghik writes:

But David nephew of Gagik raised a little disobedience towards his uncle Gagik

Gagik who was at the peak of his power in the winter of 1001 moved with a large army upon the Kiurikid kingdom of Tashir Dzoraget. He entered Tashir surrounded Shamshulde devastated the Georgian plain then descended to Aghstev province by Gag fortress. All this was done in just three months David twice tried to give battle to his uncle however the extreme inequality of forces forced him to abandon that idea and apply for the help of catholicos Sargis I. Through the mediation of the catholicos David went to Shirakavan to Gagik I and expressed obedience.

After the death of Hovhannes Smbat in 1041 the throne of the Bagratuni kingdom of Ani remained vacant David entered the territory of the Bagratuni kingdom of Ani with an army. However taking revenge by the devastation of Shirak he turned back In 1042 from the instigation of evil there was a repeated movement of Greeks by the treachery and hypocrisy of false christian David Anhoghin. And since David Anhoghin with his policy guided by narrow personal self interests brought the Christian nation into the abyss of suffering he received a new disgraceful nickname Davih.

In 1045 after the destruction of the Bagratuni kingdom of Ani by Byzantium as well as Syunik and Kars Vanand the Kiurikid kingdom of Tashir Dzoraget appeared in an independent status.

== Abas and David Destruction of the Kingdom ==
In 1050 Kiurike II eldest son of David Anhoghin is mentioned as the king of Tashir Dzoraget. The body of David Anhoghin is interred in the Holy Mother of God Surb Astvatsatsin Church of Sanahin next to his father. He had 4 sons Kiurike Gagik Atrnerseh Smbat and one daughter Hranush.

Although Kiurike II reigned as an independent king and after the abolition of the Kingdom of Kars Vanand by Byzantium in 1064 became the patriarch of the declining Bagratuni dynasty he ruled peacefully for only a decade and a half. The independence of the Kiurikid Kingdom of Tashir Dzoraget was short lived because it soon found itself in the political sphere of influence of Byzantium which had become its neighbor. If Byzantium was trying in that way to use even the weak forces of the Kiurikid Kingdom of Tashir Dzoraget to withstand the escalating Seljuk Turkish pressure Kiurike II perhaps harbored faint hopes of restoring Armenian statehood with the help of the Byzantines. It is explained by this circumstance or the lack of an alternative that Kiurike II accepted the title of curopalates and the right to mint coins granted to him between 1059 and 1063 by the Byzantine Emperor Constantine Ducas 1059-1067 However as subsequent events showed he was merely fated to exert futile efforts to preserve at least the dependent existence and territorial integrity of his kingdom.

== Principality of Tavush ==
After the fall of the Kingdom of Tashir Dzoraget Abas I settles in Tavush and his brother David in Matsnaberd. Thus the Bagratunis from Gugark finally retreat to Utik to Shakashen and Gardman leaving Lori, Javakheti and Klarjeti in the domains of the Georgian Bagrationi kings. The Principality of Tavush survives for 3 decades from 1113 to 1145 fighting against the Emir of Ganja throughout its entire existence.

The capital of the principality was Tavush fortress town Prince Abas who was in fact the first and last prince of Tavush participated in the ordination of Catholicos Grigor I of Aghvank. The principality was conquered by the troops of the Emir of Ganja and Abas left for his brother in Matsnaberd. Later when the Armenian commanders of the Georgian army Zakare Amirspasalar and Ivane Atabeg liberate most of the territories of Eastern Armenia including the kingdoms of Tashir Dzoraget Syunik and Kars. New princes or descendants of former royal houses settle in the mentioned territories. A branch of the Zakarians the Vahramians settle in Gag fortress of Tavush in the former domain of the Kiurikids.

== Principality of Matsnaberd ==
In the western part of Utik province of Greater Armenia in the 12th-13th centuries David 1113-1145 son of Kiurike II establishes the Principality of Matsnaberd. This branch was one of the feudal houses of Armenia subject to the suzerainty of the Zakarians and had political ties with neighboring principalities the lords of Tavush Haterk Nor Berd and the Georgian Orbelians In fact it was the eastern section of the former Kingdom of Tashir Dzoraget since the western section Lori had been conquered by the Georgian Bagratoni kings.

In the first half of the 12th century the Principality of Matsnaberd was in a struggle against the Seljuk Emirate of Ganja. From the period of David's successors Kiurike III (1145-1170) and Abas II (1170-1176) information about the Principality of Matsnaberd is scarce.

In the late 12th century the Kiurikids prince of Nor Berd, David attempted to seize Matsnaberd from Aghsartan I in 1176 but ended up getting overthrown by the people. In 1236 during the time of Aghsartan II the Mongols temporarily conquered Matsnaberd. In the 1250s Taghiadin participated in the Mongol campaigns Mayyafariqin Baghdad whose son Sargis is the last known ruler in the Principality of Matsnaberd. The Kiurikids of Matsnaberd also participated in Armenian spiritual cultural life Mariam sister of Abas built Kobayr Church and others. The Principality of Matsnaberd survived until the end of the 13th century.

The last representatives of the Kiurikids the final branch of the Bagratuni dynasty rule in Nor Berd. They are mentioned as Vasak I and David 12th century Vasak II early 13th century. Thus closes the final page of the royal and princely history of the Armenian Bagratunis.

== Kiurikian dinasty ==
Name	Years	Notes
Kiurike I	982-989	Brother og Smbat II, King of Tashir Dzoraget
David Anhoghin	989-1050	Son of Kiurike I, King of Tashir Dzoraget
Kiurike II	1050-1089	Son of David Anhoghin, King of Tashir Dzoraget
Abas I	1089-1113	Son of Kiurike II, King of Tashir Dzoraget
Abas I	1113-1145	Trout of Tavush
David II	1089-1113	Son of Kiurike II, King of Tashir Dzoraget
David II	1113-1145	Trout of Matsnaberd
Kiurike III	1145-1170	Trout of Matsnaberd
Abas II	1170-1176	Trout of Matsnaberd
Aghsartan I	1176-	Trout of Matsnaberd
Aghsartan II		Trout of Matsnaberd
Taghiadin I		Trout of Matsnaberd
Sargis I		Trout of Matsnaberd

== Sources ==
- Toumanoff Cyrille. Les dynasties de la Caucasie chrétienne de l'Antiquité jusqu'au. — Rome, 1990.
- Payot. Histoire de l’Arménie des origines à 1071 / René Grousset. — Rome, 1947. — 644 p.
- Ստեփանոս Տարոնեցի (Ասողիկ), Պատմութիւն տիեզերական, ՍՊԲ, 1885.
- Մատթեոս Ուռհայեցի, Ժամանակագրություն, Վաղարշապատ,1898․
- Արիստակես Լաստիվերցի, Պատմություն, Երևան, 1663․
- «Լօռիի Կիւրիկեան թագաւորներու պատմութիւնը», Ղևոնդ Մովսիսյան, Վիեննա, 1923, էջ 24, 26-28․
