= Mekhitar of Ayrivank =

Mekhitar of Ayrivank (Armenian: Մխիթար Այրիվանեցի Mxitʿar Ayrivanecʿi) (1230/35 – 1297/1300) was an Armenian monk, or vardapet, at the "Cave-Monastery", modern Geghard. He is best known for his list of history of the world. He preserves in his writings a list of canonical and non-canonical books by John the Deacon (1044–1129). His canon also includes works such as the Third Epistle to the Corinthians.

Some of his sacred music can be found on collections of Armenian sacred music, such as Joyous light Isabel Bayrakdarian, CBC.
