= Tsaghkunyats Mountains =

Mountain range in Armenia

Tsaghkunyats Ridge
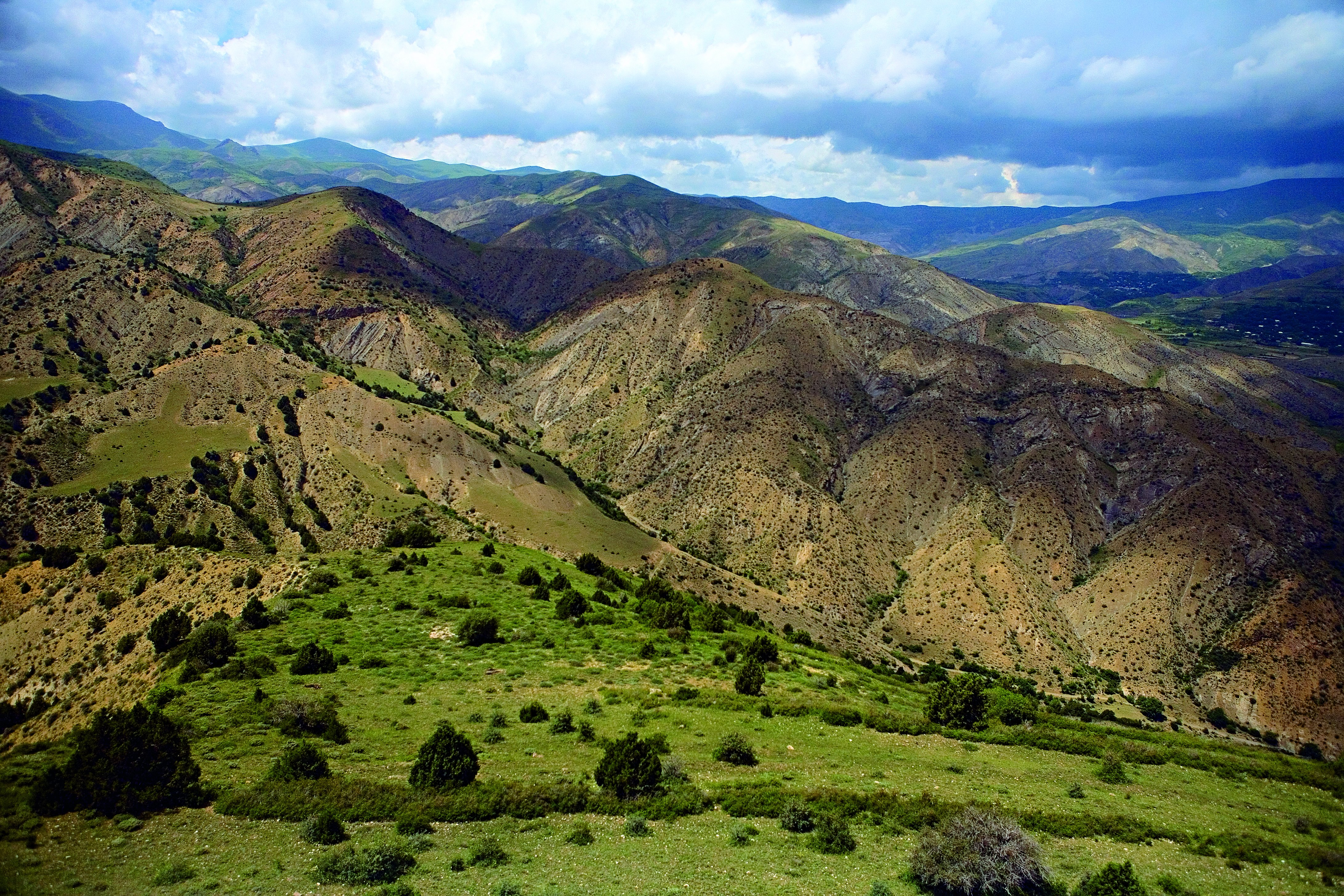
- Tsaghkunyats mountain range

Highest point
- Elevation: 2,851 m (9,354 ft)
- Coordinates: 40°33′15″N 44°35′15″E

Geography
- Location: Armenia

Geology
- Mountain type: Volcanic field

The Tsaghkunyats Mountains (or Tsaghkunyats Ridge), Armenian: Ծաղկունյաց լեռնաշղթա (Tsaghkunyats lernasheghta), are a range of mountains in Armenia, mainly in the provinces of Kotayk and Aragatsotn.

The range is of volcanic origin including many extinct volcanoes. It has a length of 42 km, stretched between Pambak Mountains near the village of Mijnatun at the north, and the right bank of Hrazdan River to the southeast. The highest peak of the Tsaghkunyats Mountains is Mount Teghenis near Tsaghkadzor, at 2851 meters. The range is formed by a volcanic field, containing Pleistocene-to-Holocene lava domes and cinder cones.

The area is a popular mountain resort with its spa towns and villages, including Tsaghkadzor, Hankavan, Bjni, Arzakan and Aghveran.

== Gallery ==
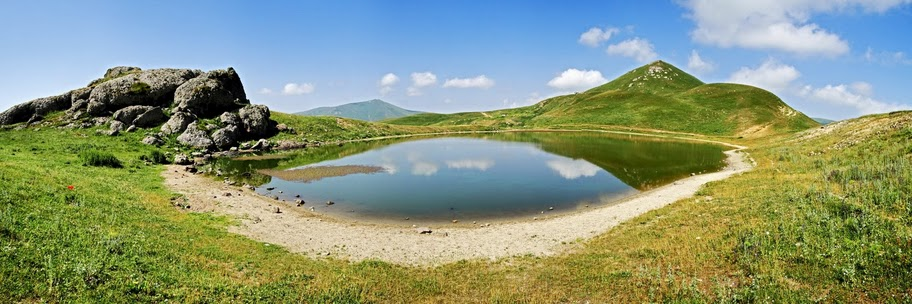
Volcanic lake at the heights of Tsaghkunyats

== See also ==
- List of volcanoes in Armenia
