= Boztepe =

Boztepe (literally "grey hill" or "blemished hill") is a Turkish place name that may refer to:

== People ==
- Mehmet Boztepe (born 1988), Turkish footballer

== Places ==
- Boztepe Dam (Tokat), a dam in Tokat Province, Turkey
- Boztepe Dam (Malatya), a dam in Malatya Province, Turkey
- Boztepe Peninsula, peninsula in the Black Sea region of Turkey
- Boztepe hill, Trabzon, a hill near Trabzon, Trabzon Province, Turkey
- Boztepe, Adıyaman, a village in Adıyaman district, Adıyaman Province, Turkey
- Boztepe, Keşan
- Boztepe, Kırşehir, a town and district of Kırşehir Province, Turkey
- Boztepe, Manavgat, a village in the Manavgat district, Antalya Province, Turkey
- Boztepe, Ordu, a village (and the name of a nearby hill) in Ordu Province, Turkey
- Boztepe, Sungurlu
- Boztepe, Tarsus, a village in Tarsus district of Mersin Province, Turkey
- Boztepe, Uğurludağ
- Boztepe, Yüreğir, a village in Yüreğir district, Adana Province, Turkey
