= Boztepe Dam =

Boztepe Dam may refer to:

- Boztepe Dam (Malatya), a dam in Turkey
- Boztepe Dam (Tokat), a dam in Turkey
