= Kaymaklı Monastery =

Ruined Armenian Apostolic monastery

Monastery of the All-Saviour
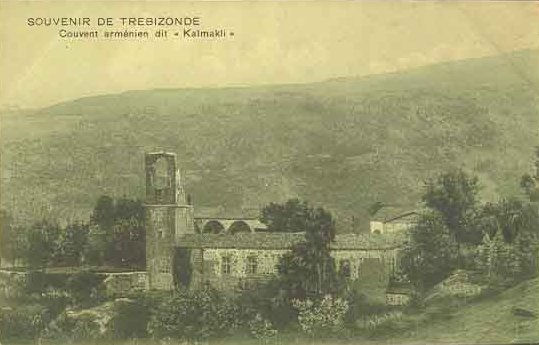
- Monastery of the All-Saviour on a postcard (1913)

- Location within Turkey

Religion
- Affiliation: Armenian Apostolic Church
- Rite: Armenian
- Status: In ruins

Location
- Location: Trebizond, Turkey
- Coordinates: 40.981944°N 39.744833°E

Architecture
- Type: Monastery
- Completed: 1424

Kaymaklı Monastery (hye: Ամենափրկիչ Վանք Amenaprgič Vank, meaning Monastery of the All-Saviour; Turkish: Kaymaklı Manastırı, Amenapırgiç Manastırı) is a ruined Armenian Apostolic monastery near Trabzon, Turkey, which served as the seat of the Trebizond diocese tied to the Patriarchate of Constantinople until the Armenian genocide in 1915.

The monastery originally included a church, a bell tower at the northwest corner, and a small chapel near the southeast corner.

== Location, founding and name ==
The monastery is located on top of Boztepe hill, three kilometres southeast of Trabzon (40°59′39″N 39°44′39″E). The site overlooks the Değirmendere Valley, the ancient river Pyxites, along which runs the main trade route into eastern Anatolia and beyond.

An Armenian community existed in Trabzon as early as the 7th century. During the Mongol invasions of the 13th and 14th centuries, numerous Armenian families fled here from Ani. However, exact date of the monastery's foundation and origin remains unclear. A religious community was present at the site from at least the fifteenth century, and possibly as early as the eleventh. The oldest structure in the compound is dated to 1424. In 1461 it was pillaged and destroyed by Turks. In the 16th century, the rebuilt monastery became a center of Armenian manuscript production.

It was named Ամենափրկիչ Վանք (Amenaprgič Vank) in Armenian, which translates as "Monastery of the All-Saviour". The Ottoman Sultan Murad III is said to have eaten a meal at the monastery consisting only of dairy products. He confirmed the monastery's possession of its lands, and the place came to be called in Turkish Kaymaklı, meaning "with/of kaymak", in memory of the occasion. Previously it had been called Yesil Manastir - the Green Monastery.

== Buildings ==
The site was a terrace enclosed by a wall 30 x 40m. The wall is now almost completely destroyed. The oldest surviving structure is a small chapel located at the eastern end of the compound. According to an inscription above the door, it was built in 1424 by prince Hodja Stephanos Shemsedli (Khoja Stepanos Shemsedin). The chapel has reused khachkars in its walls. The original complex included a zhamatun, fountain known as the milk fountain, a tower, the mentioned chapel, and an arcaded monastic building.

=== Main church ===
The main church is rectangular in form, with three naves and three apses. The main apse is pentagonal. The founding date for the church is not clear but is believed to have been built on surviving parts of a 12-13th century Greek church on the site. The original roof of the main church was made of timber and had fallen-in by 1929. In 1961 a replacement roof, also made of timber, was installed when the church began to be used as a barn. The roof had fallen once again as the weather took its toll in the late 2000s. Currently, the church has a metal roof to protect the interior of the church from the elements. There was a narthex or zhamatun at the western end of the church, but it has entirely disappeared.

The inside of the church is decorated with elaborate frescoes showing various biblical scenes. They are believed to have been painted in the 17-18th centuries. On the west wall is a large fresco on three sections depicting the Last Judgment. North-west of the church are the remains of a bell tower, once an extremely tall structure. South of the church are the remains of a 2-story monastic building that had a portico with stone columns on the lower floor.

== Modern times ==
Until 1915 it served as the seat of the Trebizond diocese tied to the Armenian Patriarchate of Constantinople. At this time, the vibrant Armenian community of the city numbered 30,000. In 1915, the normal functions of the monastery were interrupted when it was used as a transit camp for Armenians being deported to Syria during the Armenian genocide. After the Russian capture of Trebizond, Armenian monks returned to the monastery, and monks were there until sometime after World War I, supposedly 1923.

A fire may have partially ruined the site at a later date. By the 1950s, the main church was roofless and most of the bell-tower had been destroyed. In the current day, the Kaymaklı Monastery is a protected building in Trabzon. There have been slight modifications to the building in terms of restorations, like a modern roof made of metal. The monastery is currently not in use but can be visited by anyone who opts to do so.

== See also ==
- Hagia Sophia cathedral of Trabzon
- Kuştul Monastery
- Sümela Monastery

== Gallery ==
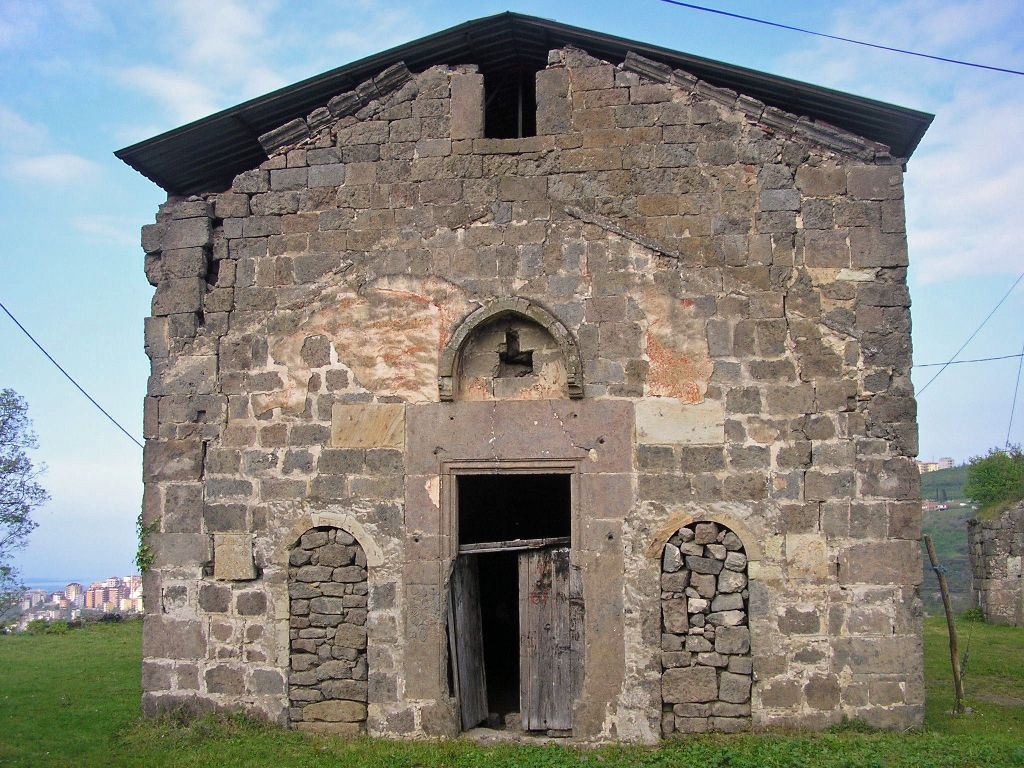
Kaymaklı Monastery front view

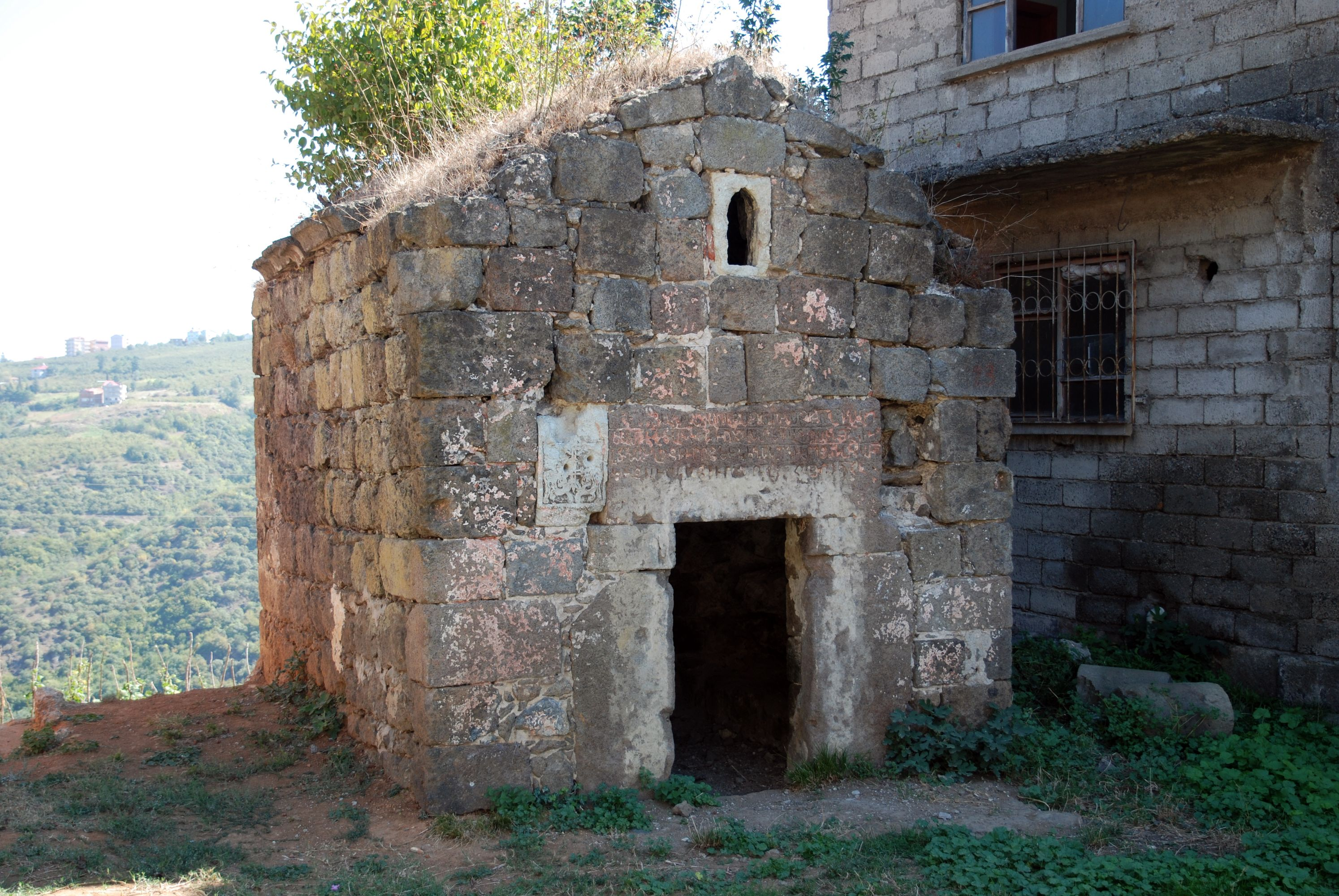
Kaymaklı Monastery Chapel

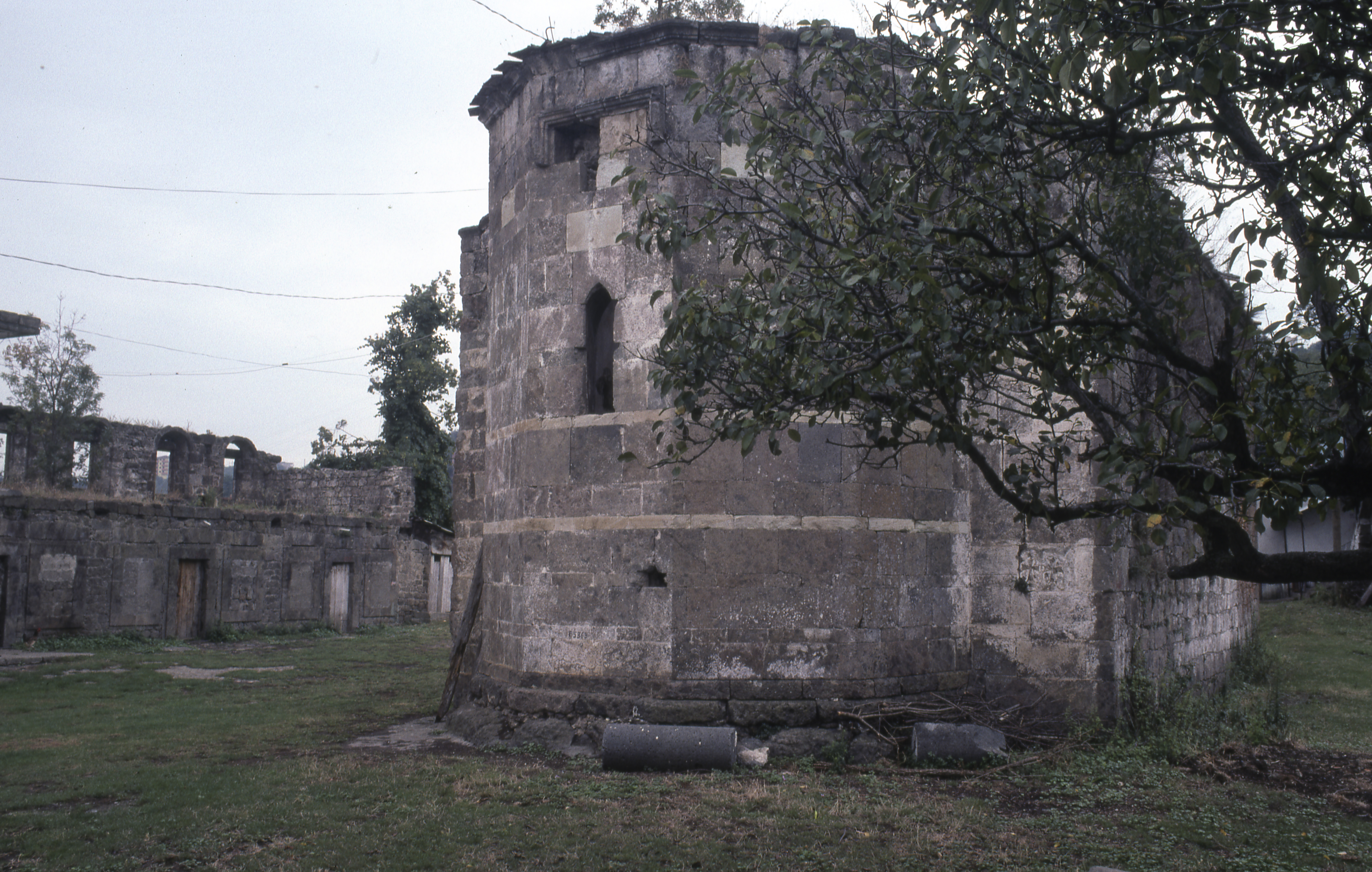
Kaymaklı Manastırı Apse

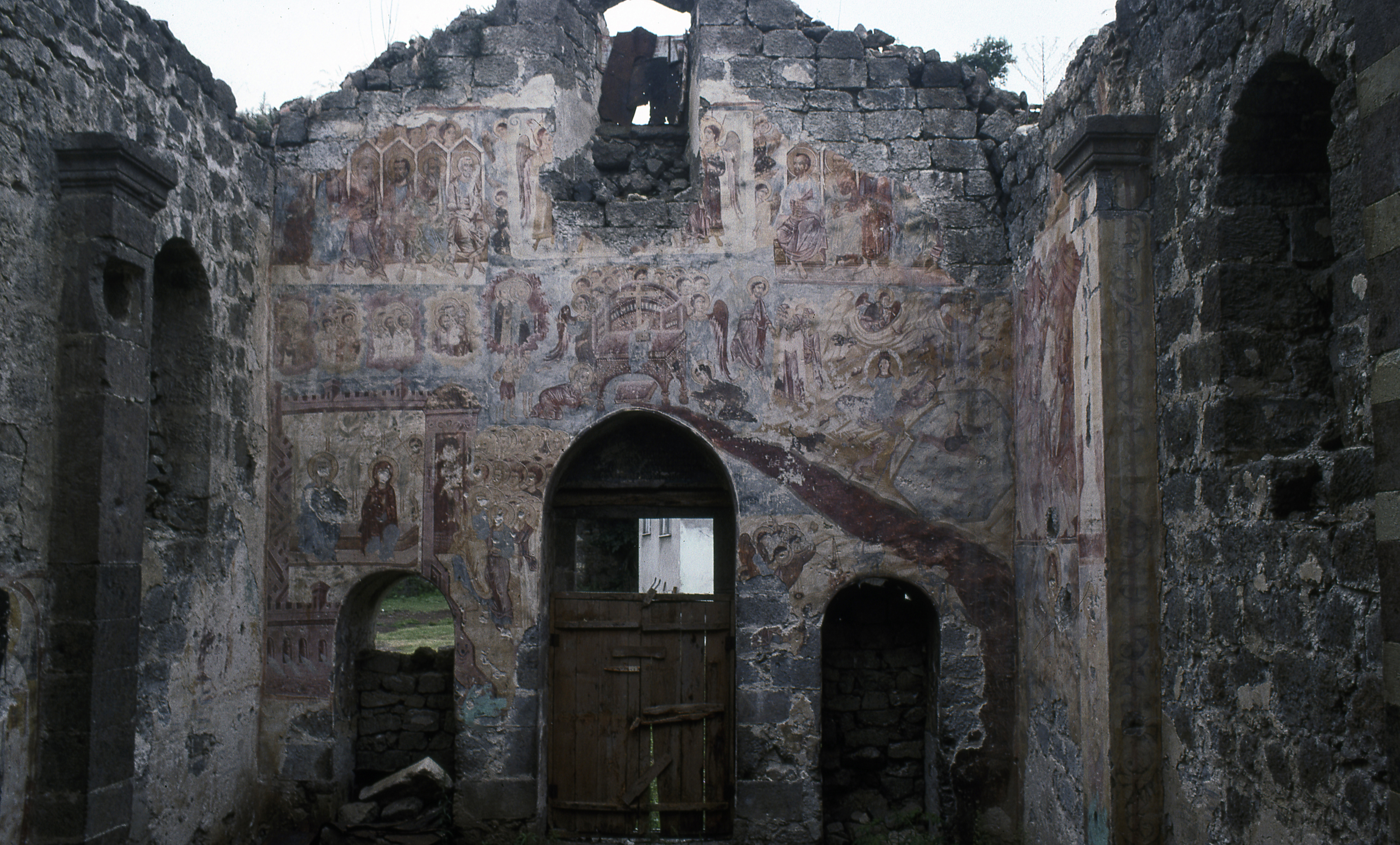
Kaymaklı Manastırı Roofless chapel

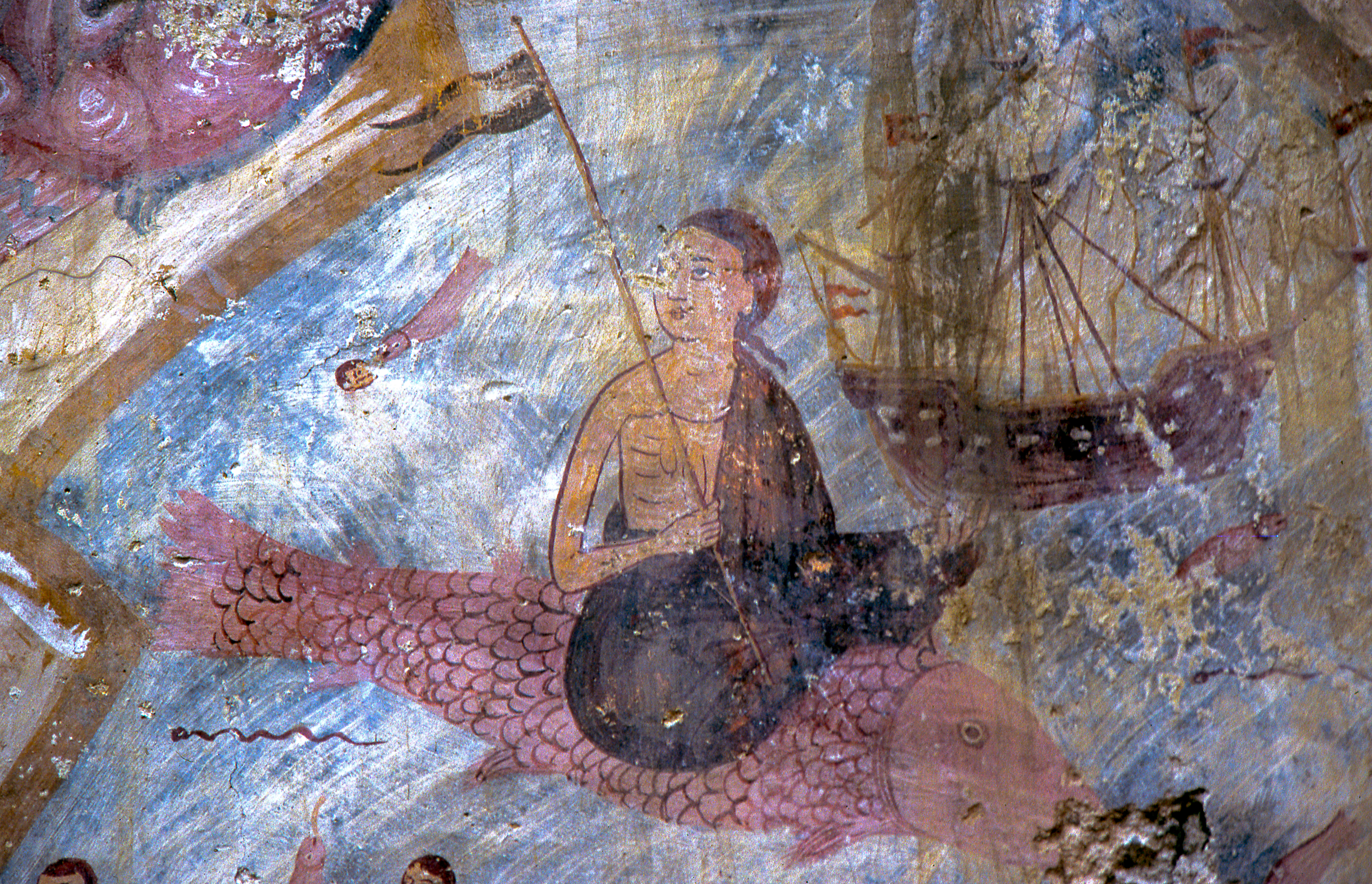
Kaymaklı Manastırı

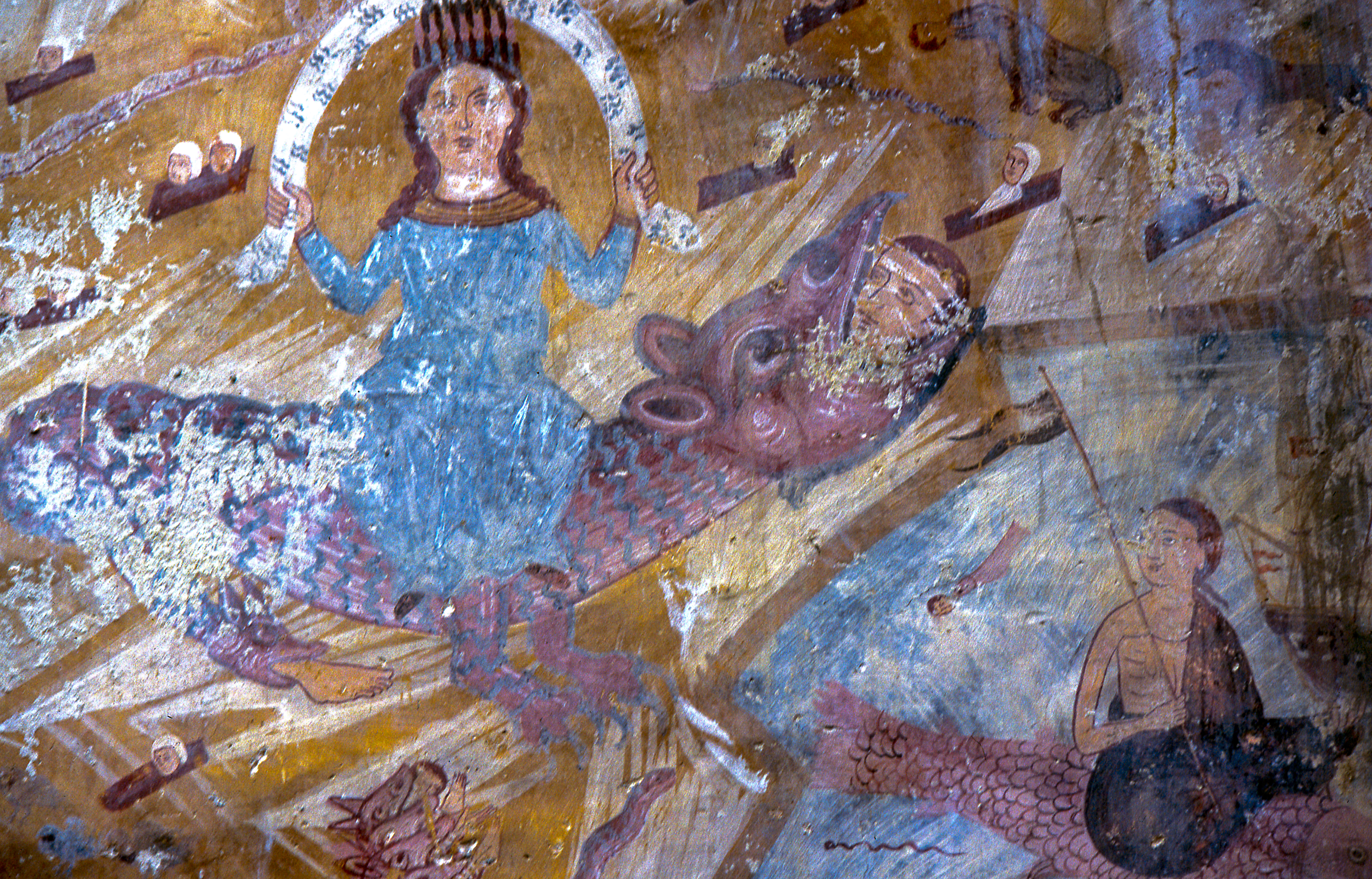
Kaymaklı Manastırı

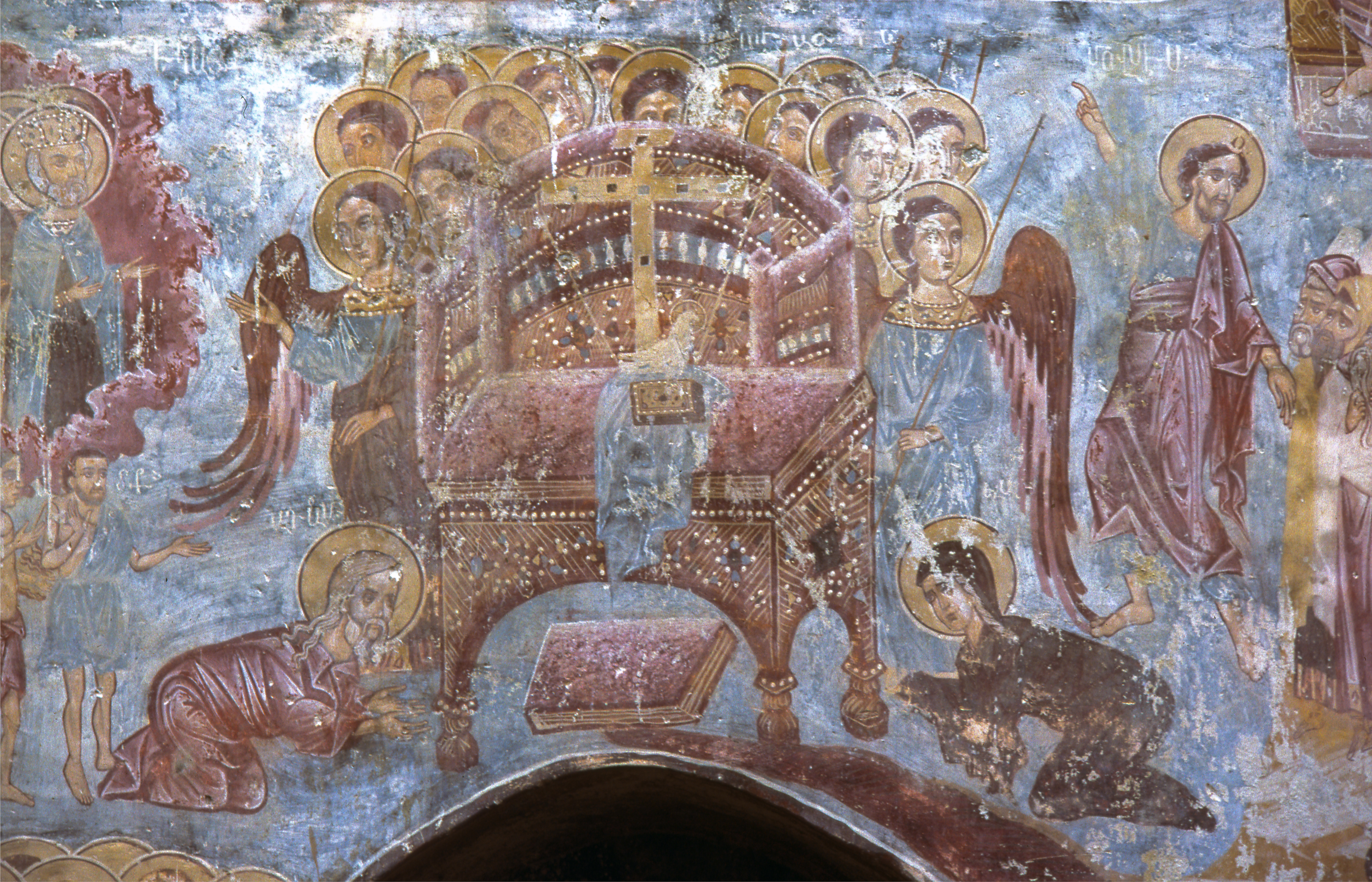
Kaymaklı Manastırı

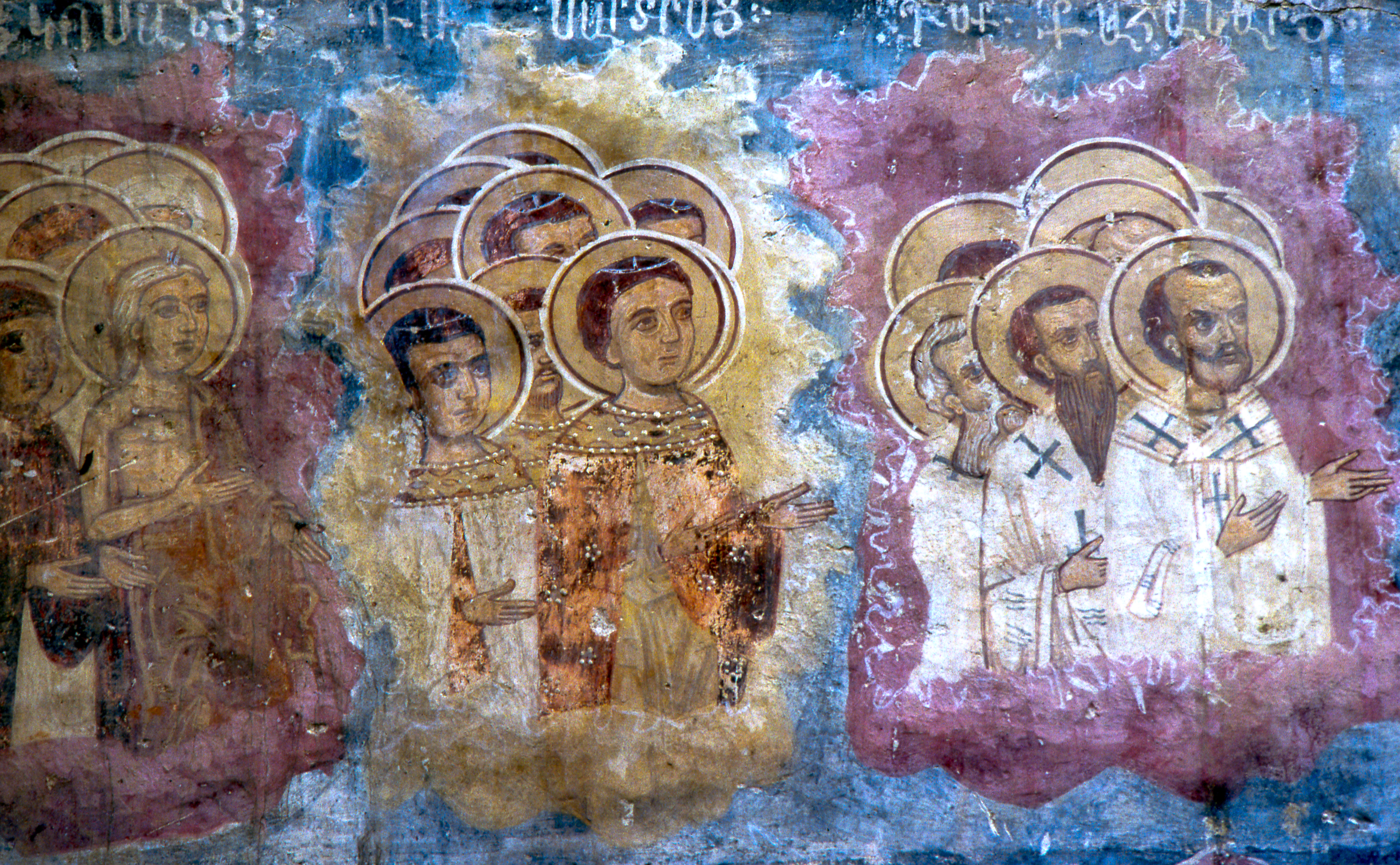
Kaymaklı Manastırı

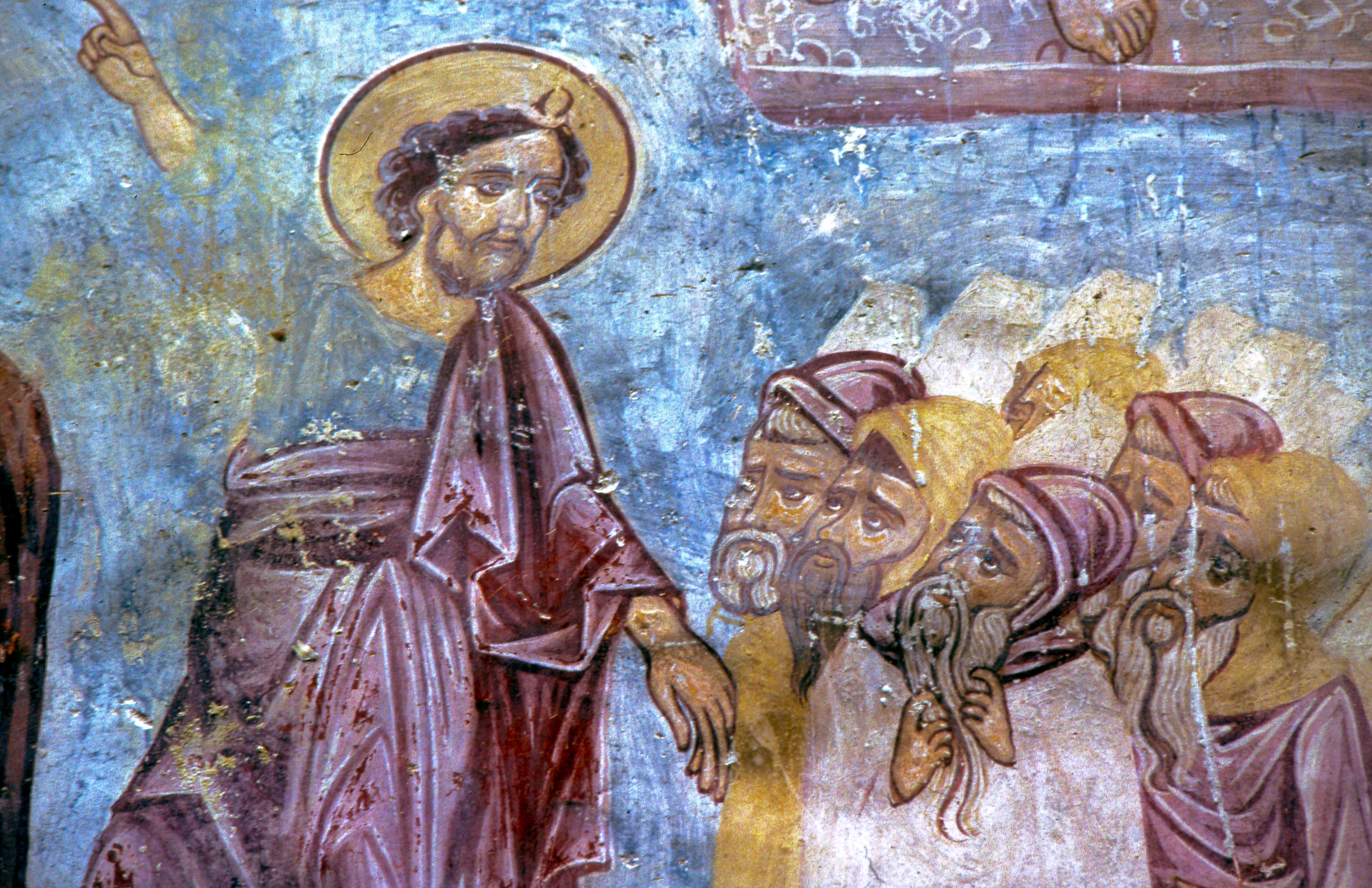
Kaymaklı Manastırı

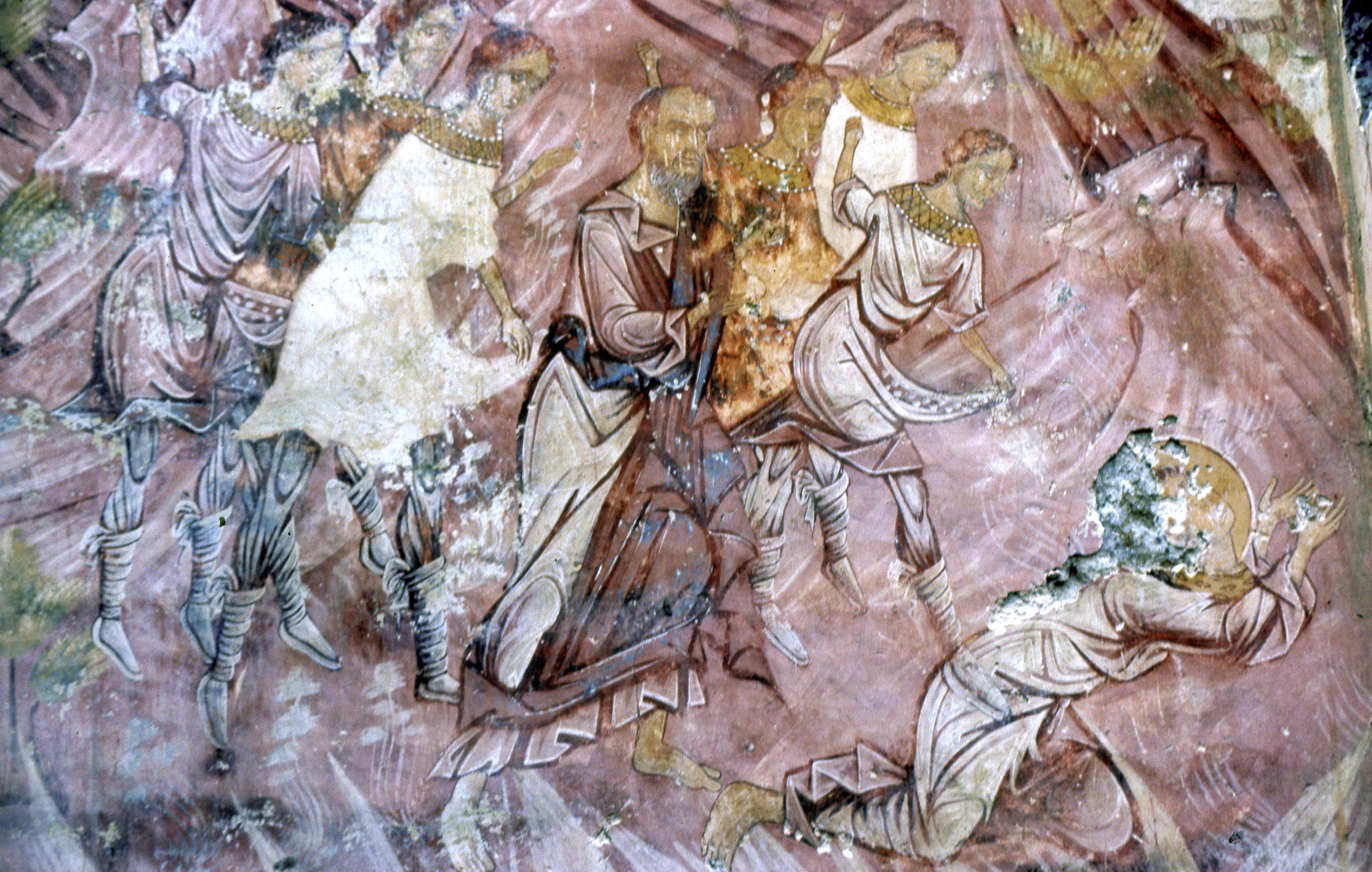
Kaymaklı Manastırı
