= St. Astvatzatzin =

Churches in Armenia

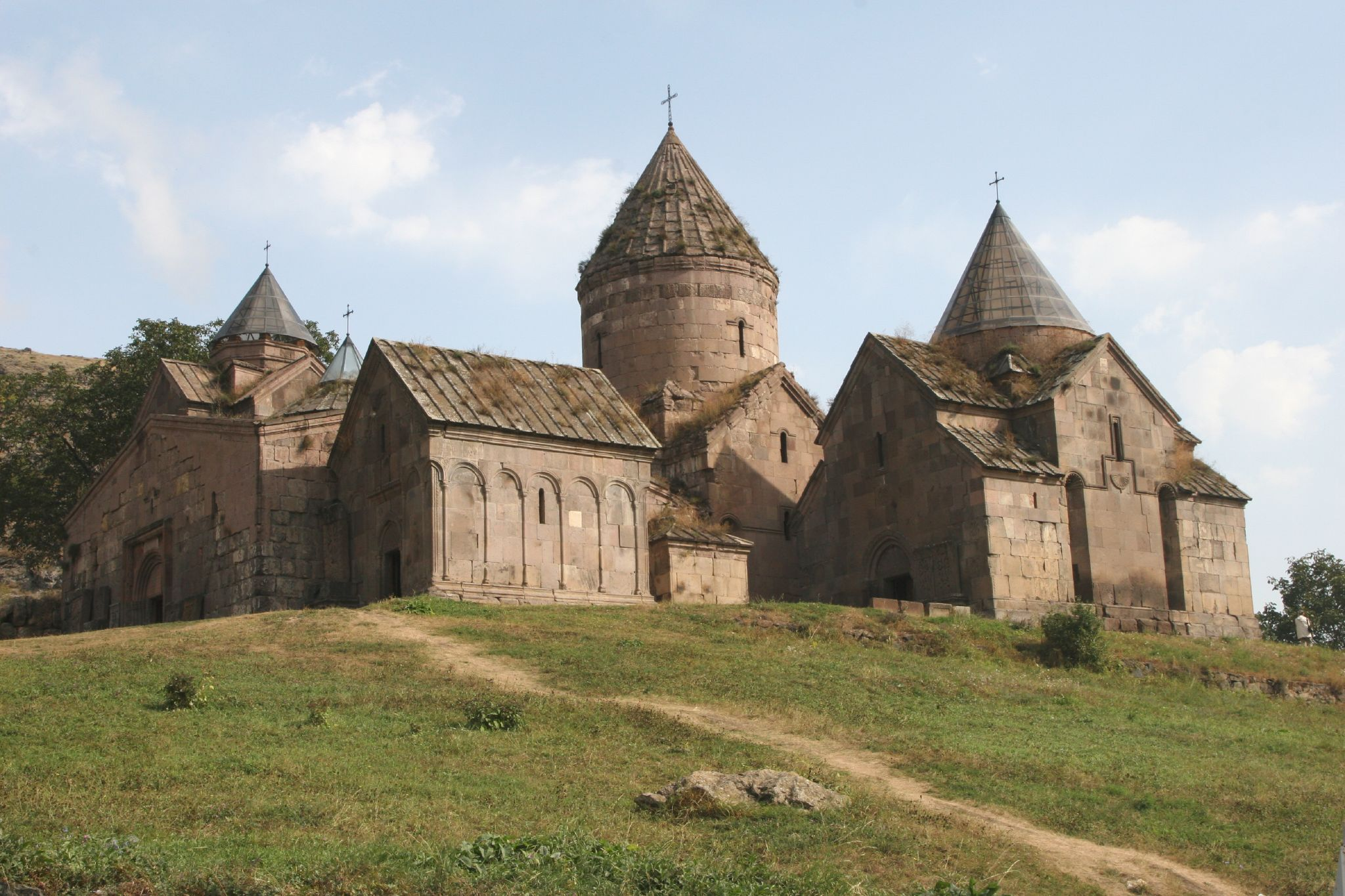
The Goshavank Monastery

The church of St Astvatzatzin (Mother of God) in Armenia is a series of small, free-standing cruciform churches and was built in 1866 and for which quite a large number of decorative parts from the already ruined cathedral was used. The entire area contains a rich presence of historical evidence, among others the remnants of building, which according to T. Tormanian are the ruins of noble residence, probably belonging to the house of Kamsarakan.
