= Boztepe Peninsula =

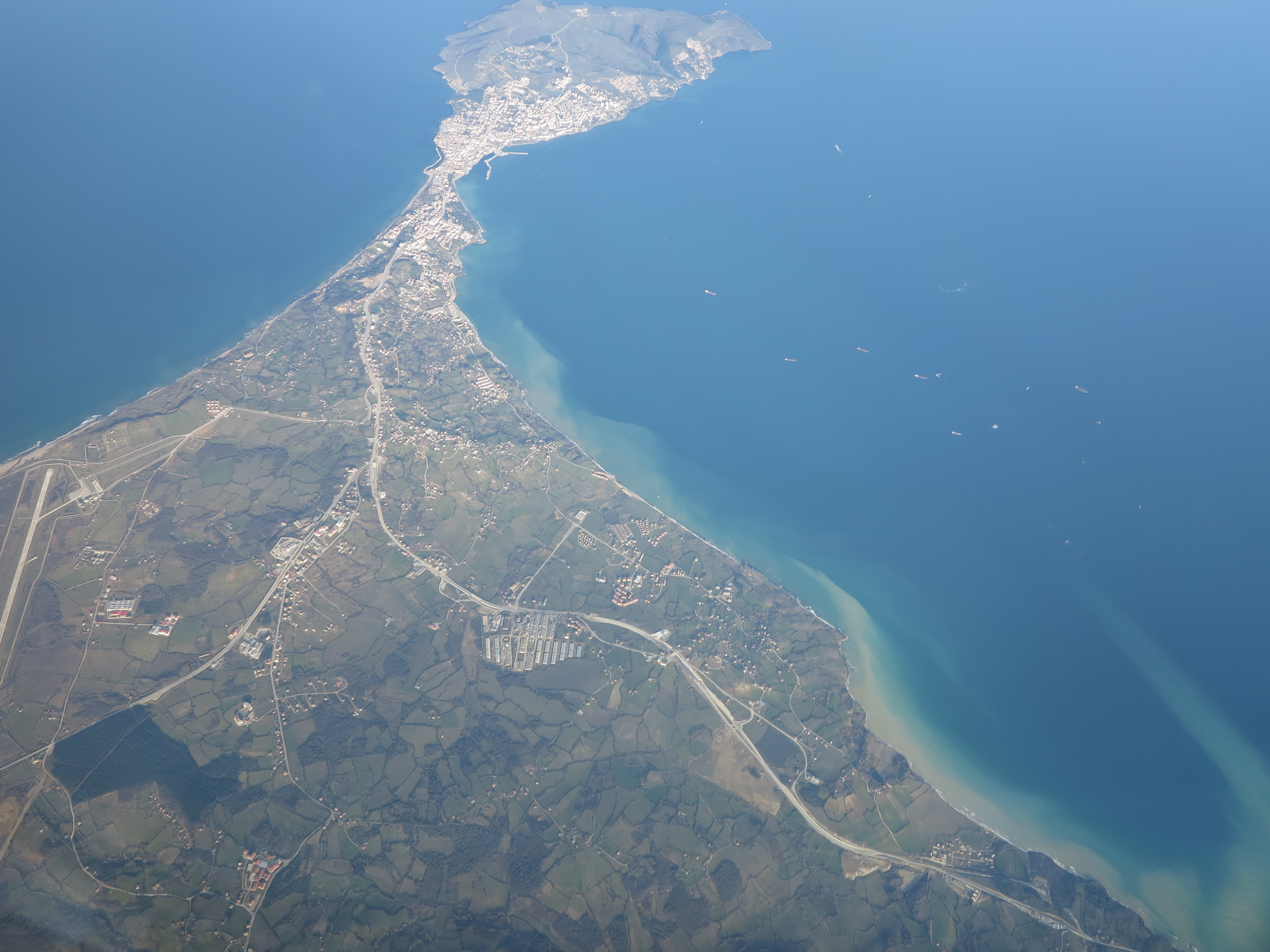
The mainland, isthmus and the peninsula seen from the west

Boztepe Peninsula is a peninsula in the Black Sea region of Turkey. It is in Sinop Province. The midpoint of the peninsula is at about 42°01′30″N 35°11′00″E

The link between the mainland (which itself is a bigger peninsula) to the west and Boztepe to the east is an isthmus of 1.5 kilometres (0.93 mi) length and only 300 metres (980 ft) width. Thus the peninsula looks like an island and it is sometimes called "island". The area of the peninsula is about 7 square kilometres (2.7 sq mi). The bay to the south of the peninsula (called İçliman) is a natural harbor sheltered from most winds except for the south east wind. Because of this advantage historically Sinop was one of the most active ports of the Black Sea coast before the Battle of Sinop in 1853.

The peninsula is quite populated. More than half of the Sinop city, including the historical buildings, is either in the southwest part of the peninsula or on the isthmus. In the east part of the peninsula a street runs in parallel to the coast and encircle the peninsula. At the easternmost end of the peninsula there is a lighthouse equipped with a foghorn.
