= Boztepe Hill, Trabzon =

Hill in Trabzon Province, Turkey

Coordinates: 40.995°N 39.731°E

Boztepe or Mount Minthrion is a hill near Trabzon, in Turkey. It is located 3 kilometers southeast of the city center of Trabzon. The Değirmendere Valley lies to the east of Boztepe. The Kaymaklı quarter occupies most of the Boztepe hill. The area has been religiously significant since ancient times. There are four sacred fountains on Boztepe.

- That of Saint John the Sanctifier is near the summit. On the site is a mosque that was formerly a nineteenth-century church. The church in turn may have replaced a sanctuary to Mithras, which may have been the origin of the name Minthrion.
- That of Kaymaklı Monastery is known as the milk fountain.
- The Skylolimne is now a mostly-dry lake.
- The Dragon's fountain (Δράκοντπήάσον) is near Hoşoğlan village. According to John Lazaropoulos' Logos on St. Eugenios of Trebizond, Alexios II of Trebizond killed a dragon at the site.
- The Panagia Theoskepastos Monastery

== Sources ==
- Bryer, Anthony; David Winfield (March 1985). Byzantine Monuments and Topography of the Pontos (Dumbarton Oaks Studies, 20) Two Volume Set. Dumbarton Oaks Pub Service. ISBN 0-88402-122-X.
- Whiting, Dominic (2001). Turkey Handbook. Footprint Travel Guides. ISBN 1-900949-85-7.
