= Boztepe, Tarsus =

Boztepe
- Neighbourhood
- Location in Turkey
- Coordinates: 37°04′55″N 34°37′1″E
- Country: Turkey
- Province: Mersin
- District: Tarsus
- Elevation: 1,150 m (3,770 ft)
- Population (2022): 263
- Time zone: UTC+3 (TRT)
- Area code: 0324

Boztepe is a neighbourhood in the municipality and district of Tarsus, Mersin Province, Turkey. Its population is 263 (2022). It is situated in the Taurus Mountains. Its distance to Tarsus is 40 kilometres (25 mi) and its distance to Mersin is 67 kilometres (42 mi).
