= Boztepe Dam (Tokat) =

Coordinates: 40.1755°N 35.8705°E

- Location: Turkey

Boztepe Dam is a dam in Turkey. The development was backed by the Turkish State Hydraulic Works.

== See also ==
- List of dams and reservoirs in Turkey
