= Boztepe Dam (Malatya) =

- Location: Turkey
- Coordinates: 40.17531°N 35.87136°E

Boztepe Dam is a dam in Malatya Province, Turkey, built between 1994 and 2002. The development was backed by the Turkish State Hydraulic Works.

== See also ==
- List of dams and reservoirs in Turkey
