= Proshyan dynasty =

Armenian-Georgian noble family

Proshyans Armenian: Պռոշյանք
- Armenian nobility
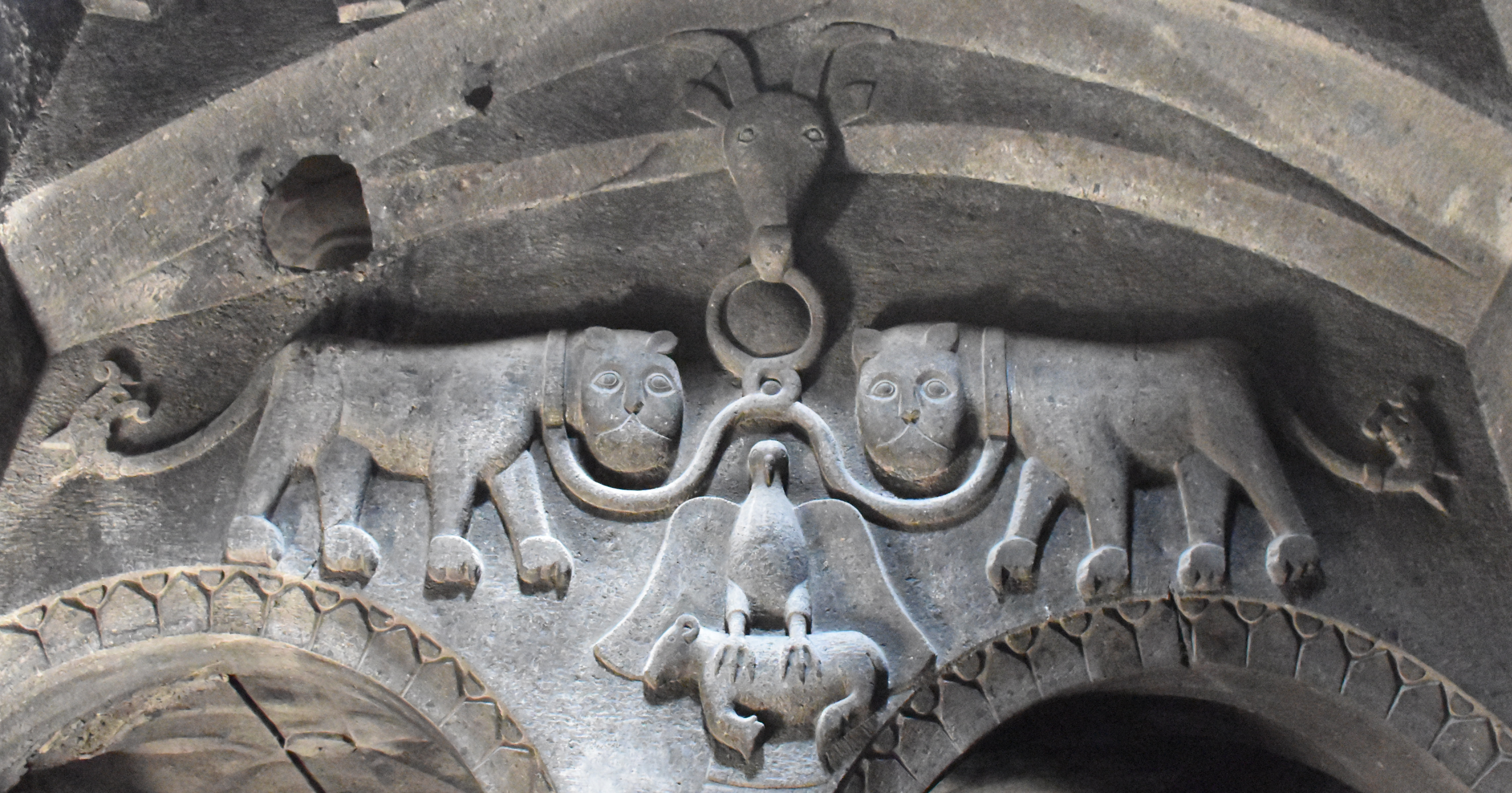
- Coat of arms of the Proshyans, 1283, Geghard
- Country: Kingdom of Georgia
- Founded: c. 1250
- Founder: Prosh Khaghbakian

The Proshyan dynasty, also Khaghbakians or Xaghbakian-Proshians (Armenian: Խաղբակյանք/Պռոշյանք), was a family of the Armenian nobility, named after its founder Prince Prosh Khaghbakian. The dynasty was a vassal of Zakarid Armenia during the 13th–14th century CE, established as nakharar feudal lords as a reward for their military successes. Zakarid Armenia was itself vassal of the Kingdom of Georgia from 1201, effectively falling under Mongol control after 1236, while Georgian rule only remained nominal. The Proshyans were princes of Bjni, Garni, Geghard and Noravank. The family prospered as an ally of the Mongols, following the Mongol invasions of Armenia and Georgia, as did the Zakarians and Orbelians. Despite heavy Mongol taxes, they benefited from trade routes to China under the control of the Mongols, and built many magnificent churches and monasteries.

== Context ==
In the mid-11th century, the region of Tsaghkadzor suffered from the Seljuk invasion led by Tughril and later by his successor Alp Arslan. Later, in the early 13th century, the Georgians captured the Syunik region from the Kipchak Eldiguzids, a successor state of the Seljuks (Georgian–Seljuk wars). With the establishment of the Zakarid Principality of Armenia in 1201 under the Georgian protectorate, Kecharuyk witnessed a significant rise in economic and cultural life under the rule of the Khaghbakyan and later the Proshyan noble families, during the 13th and the 14th centuries. After the Mongols captured Ani in 1236, Armenia turned into a Mongol protectorate as part of the Ilkhanate. After the fall of the Ilkhanate in the mid-14th century, the Zakarid princes ruled over Lori, Shirak, Kotayk, and Ararat plain until 1360 when they fell to the invading Turkic tribes of the Timurids and Qara Qoyunlu.

== Main figures ==
=== Ancestors ===
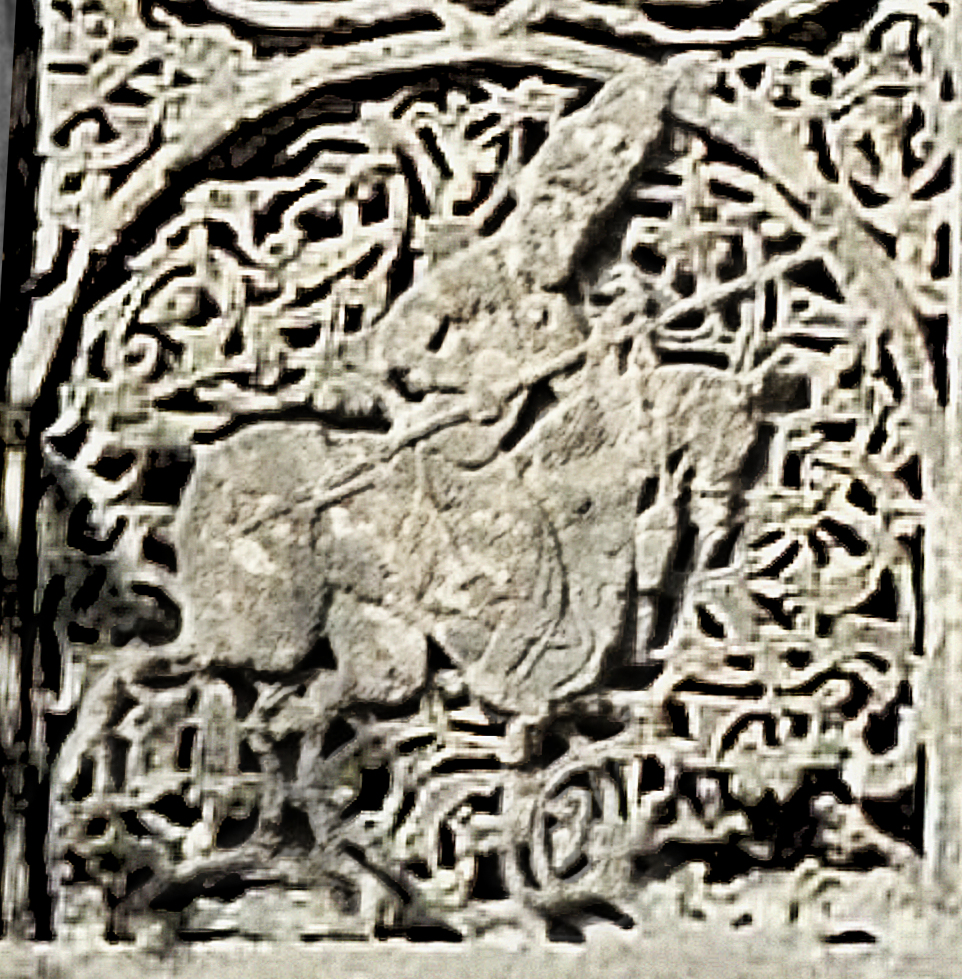
Grigor Khaghbakian on his khatchkar cross (1233).

Prosh Khaghbakian, founder of the Proshyan dynasty, had a grandfather named Haghbak, who is only known from the genealogical inscriptions of his descendants. Prosh's father was named Vasak Khaghbakian ("Vasak the Great"), himself a vassal of Ivane I Zakarian of the Zakarian princes of Armenia who had helped in the reconquest of Vayots Dzor, Bjni, and Dvin over the Seljuk Eldiguzids.

Prosh's uncle Grigor Khaghbakian (died in 1220–1223) was a relatively well-known Prince who left some religious buildings and works of art, and sacrificed himself in the conflict with the Kipchaks in c. 1222. The Armenian historian Kirakos Gandzaketsi reports that some time after a 1220 Mongol incursion under Subutai, the Kipchaks came to the Armenian city of Gandzak between 1220 and 1223, where they encountered the troops of King Lasha of Georgia and his atabeg Ivane. Although the Georgians ultimately prevailed, Grigor Khaghbakian was captured and tortured to death by the Kipchak Turks.

Together with his wife Zaz, he built the Surp Stepanos church at Aghjots Vank in 1217. Grigor Khaghbakian is also known for a 1233 khatchkar with a sacred image, now in Etchmiadzin Cathedral, where it was brought from Imirzek.

The Khachqar cross dedicated by Grigor Khaghbakian in 1233, now located near Etchmiadzin Cathedral, is considered as one of the finest, with its detailed and refined openwork sculpture. A fine Deesis decorated the entablature, and the donator appears on horse at the bottom, a rare occurrence as such crosses are not often decorated with human depictions.

=== Prosh Khaghbakian (r. 1223–1283) ===
Prince Prosh Khaghbakian (sometimes spelled Brosh Xalbakean), also referred to as "Hasan Khaghbakian called "Prosh"" (1223–1283), was also an Armenian Prince in the service of Zakarid Armenia, itself nominally vassal to the Kingdom of Georgia, at a time when Georgia was itself under the control of the Mongols (officially since the 1239 treaty). As a reward for his military successes, the Zakarids granted him the title nakharar, which allowed him to found his own dynasty with his own feudal fief in the service of the Zakarids. The dynasty came to be known as "Proshyan" in his honour. He was a lord of the Khaghabakian or Pŕoshian House in Urkghunk‘, Boloraberd, Eghegiats‘ Dzor and Hrashk‘aberd.

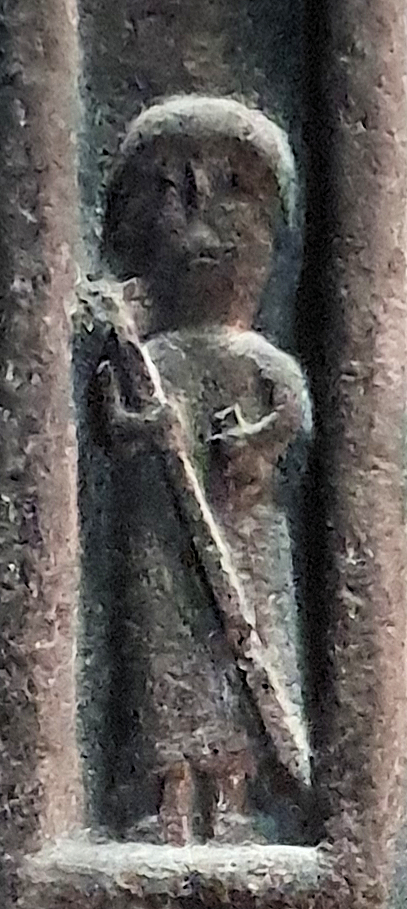
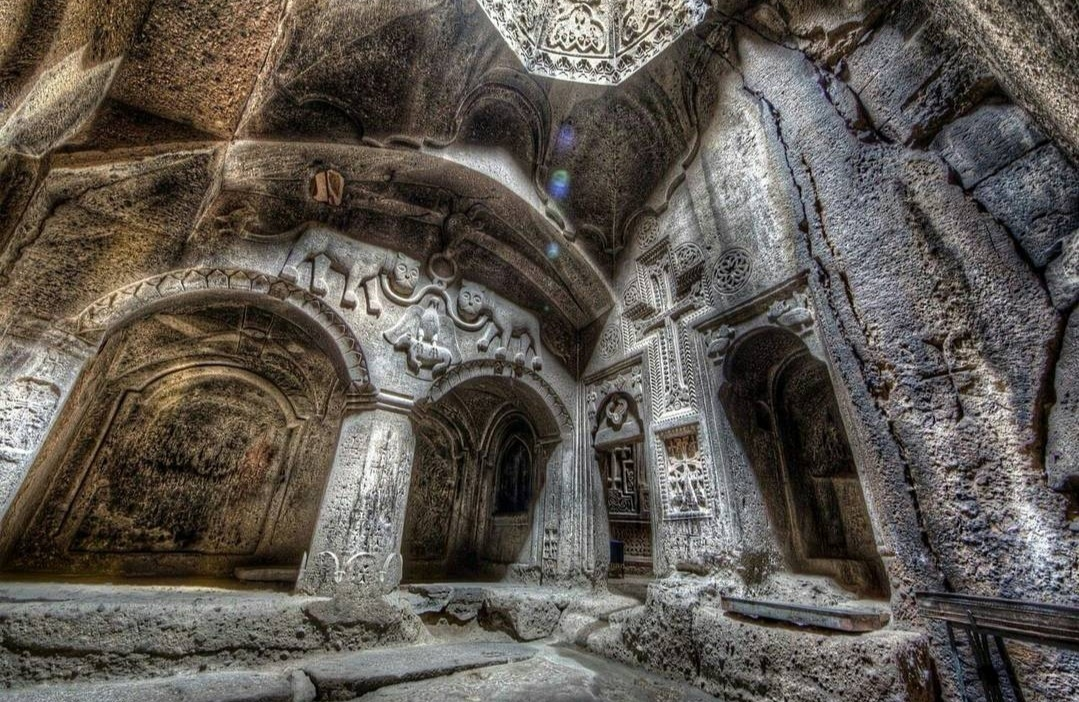
Donor figure and family mausoleum in the "Mausoleum of the Proshians" of Geghard Monastery, dedicated by Prince Prosh in 1283.

Following the successful submission of Avag Zakarian to the Mongols in 1236, the Proshyans were among many other Caucasian princes who followed suit the same year, in the understanding that they would be able to retain their lands under Mongol suzerainty. Greater Armenian lords entered into a collaborative relationship with the Mongols: Awag Zak‘arian assisted Chormaghan and Guyuk Khan, Hasan Jalal supported Sartakh and Mongke Khan; Smbat Orbelian supported Mongke Khan and Hulegu, while Prosh and Sadun Artsruni helped Hulegu and Abaqa Khan.

In 1256, the historical territories of Armenia were directly incorporated into the Mongol Ilkhanate of Persia. Prosh was one of the main Greater Armenian lords to execute the alliance between his nominal suzerain the Georgian King David Ulu (ruled 1247-1270) and the Mongol Prince Hulagu, during the Mongol conquest of Middle-East (1258–1260). In 1258, he led Armenian troops to participate to the Mongol Siege of Baghdad, while Zakare III Zakarian was leading the Georgian troops. He was the main source for the account of the fall of Baghdad by the Armenian historian Kirakos. He had a son named Ami Hasan I (died in 1292).

Prosh Khaghbakian was involved in the development of the Geghard medieval monastery in the Kotayk province of Armenia, partially carved out of the adjacent mountain and surrounded by cliffs. He purchased the monastery in the 1240s, and built a series of additional chapels hewn into the rock. The chamber reached from the North East of the gavit and became Prince Prosh Khaghbakian's tomb in 1283. Over a short period, the Proshyans built the cave structures which brought Geghard well-merited fame — the second cave church, the family sepulcher of Prosh's son Papak and Ruzukan, a hall for gatherings and studies (collapsed in the middle of the 20th century) and numerous cells.

=== Amir Hasan I (1284-1292) ===
Amir Hasan I ("Prince of princes", isxanac isxan) was a successor of Prosh Khaghbakian. He appears in a 1292 colophon by the monk Xalbakeank, who also described the troubles due Mongol domination: "Under the rule of the oppressor, of strange appearance and ruthless, which is called Tatar, of the impious race of Cathay, who invaded the whole world because of our sins. And they are so ruthless and cruel that brother kills brother and father kills son, but God's punishment will come...". Xalbakeank recounts the death of Amir Hasan I that year, and his succession by his son Eacci.

=== Eachi (r. 1292-1318) and Amir Hassan II (r.1318-1351) ===
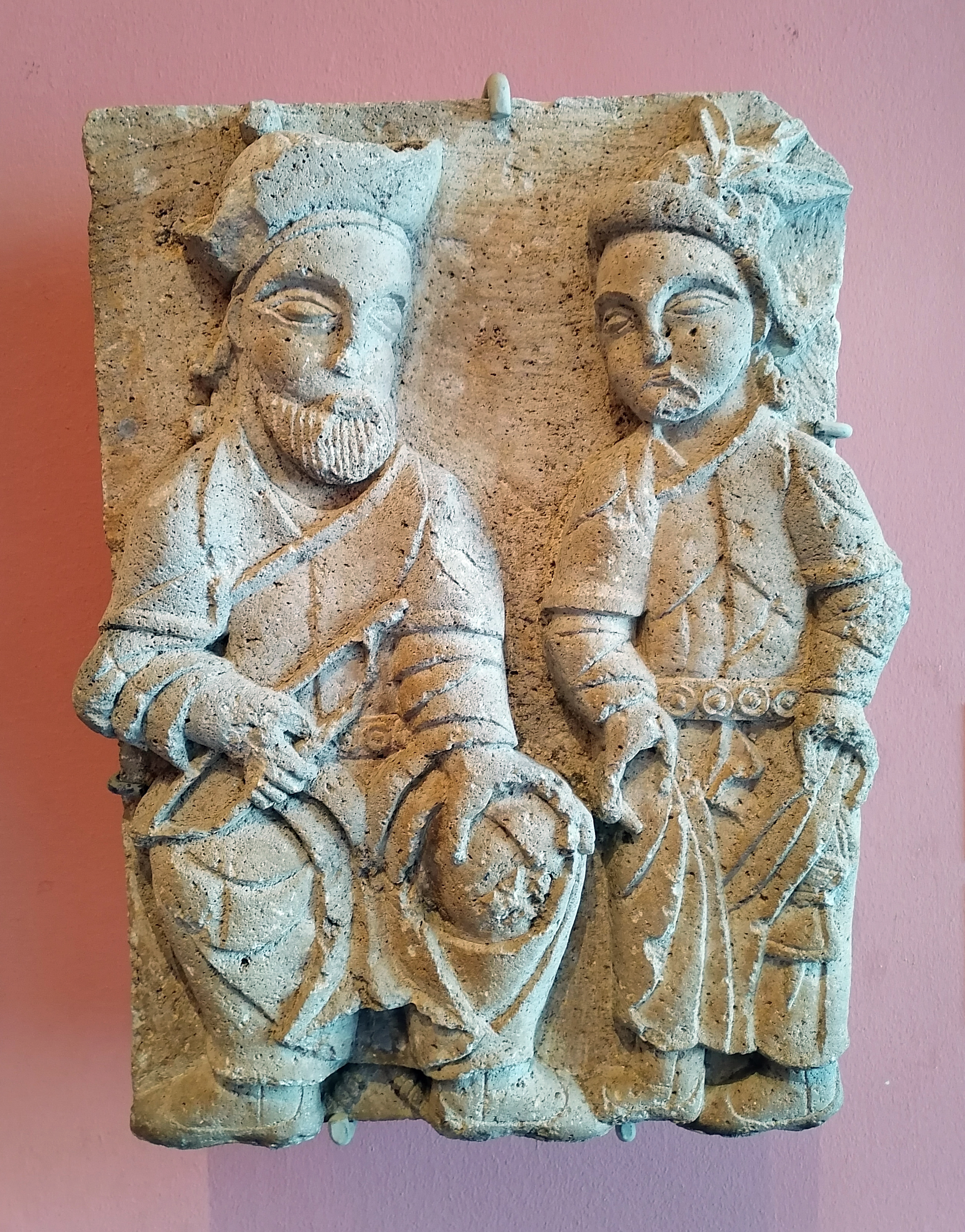
Relief depicting Eachi and Amir Hassan II of the Proshian dynasty ("a portrait identified by scholars as the father and son together"), c. 1321. Astvatsatsin Spitakavor Monastery, Vayots Dzor, Hermitage Museum, inv. No. AR-619.

Spitakavor Monastery was built by two princes from the Proshian dynasty during the Zakarid Armenia period. The construction of the church began by Prince Eachi Proshian (died in 1318), a grandson of Prosh Khaghbakian, and completed in 1321 by his son Prince Amir Hasan II. Eachi Proshian (-1318) is depicted in one reliefs from Spitakavor, and on a golden reliquary, he which he shown holding his hands up in prayer, and wearing a Mongol-style dress (cloud collar). On his reliquary, Eachi Proshyan engraved a colophon recounting the story of his family:

With the will of almighty God, I, Each‘i, son of Hasan, son of Prosh, son of Vasak the Great, from the family of Khaghbak, ruled over my fatherland of Shabunik and many other countries with the help and support of Christ and of the Holy Cross of the Vegetarians in which my ancestors too found strength [and] built a tabernacle for it as unerasable memory. You who stand in front of this remember in prayers me and my parents, the Prince Hasan and Tajer, and my father’s brother Papak‘, and all our ancestors and family.

— Colophon of the Holy Cross of the Vegetarians, circa 1300.

Also from the Monastery, a relief represents a young rider in princely attire with a bow, with the letters ԱՄՐ ՀՍ (AMR HS), indicating Prince Amir Hasan II of the Proshians, son of Eachi Proshian, who completed the church his father had started. The relief is dated to 1320–1322, date the church was completed. In these depictions, the Proshyans wear close-fitting clothing with an ornate belt and tall hats, and have round cheeks and almond-shaped eyes in a style characteristic of Mongol-era Armenia. Riding a horse, Prince Amir Hasan wears a close-fitting tunic and a three-pointed hat with two ribbons, characteristic of 14th century Mongol nobility, and his facial features are similar to those of the Mongols. Prince Eacchi Proshian on his reliquary, dated circa 1300, is shown wearing a Mongol-style royal dress (cloud collar).

The Proshyan dynasty continued to rule in Vayots Dzor and Shahapunik under the Timurids, while the Orbelians were allowed to rule in Siunik, the Dopians in Tsar. But their circumstances were difficult, and they receive huge pressure to convert to Islam.

The Melikdom of Kashatagh (1475-1730) was founded at the end of the 15th century by Melik Haykaz I, also the founder of the Melik-Haykazyan dynasty (the youngest branch of the Armenian princely Proshyan dynasty). Previously, the Kashatagh region was first ruled by the Orbelian family, and then by the Shahurnetsi clan.

== Sponsorship of monastical institutions and art ==
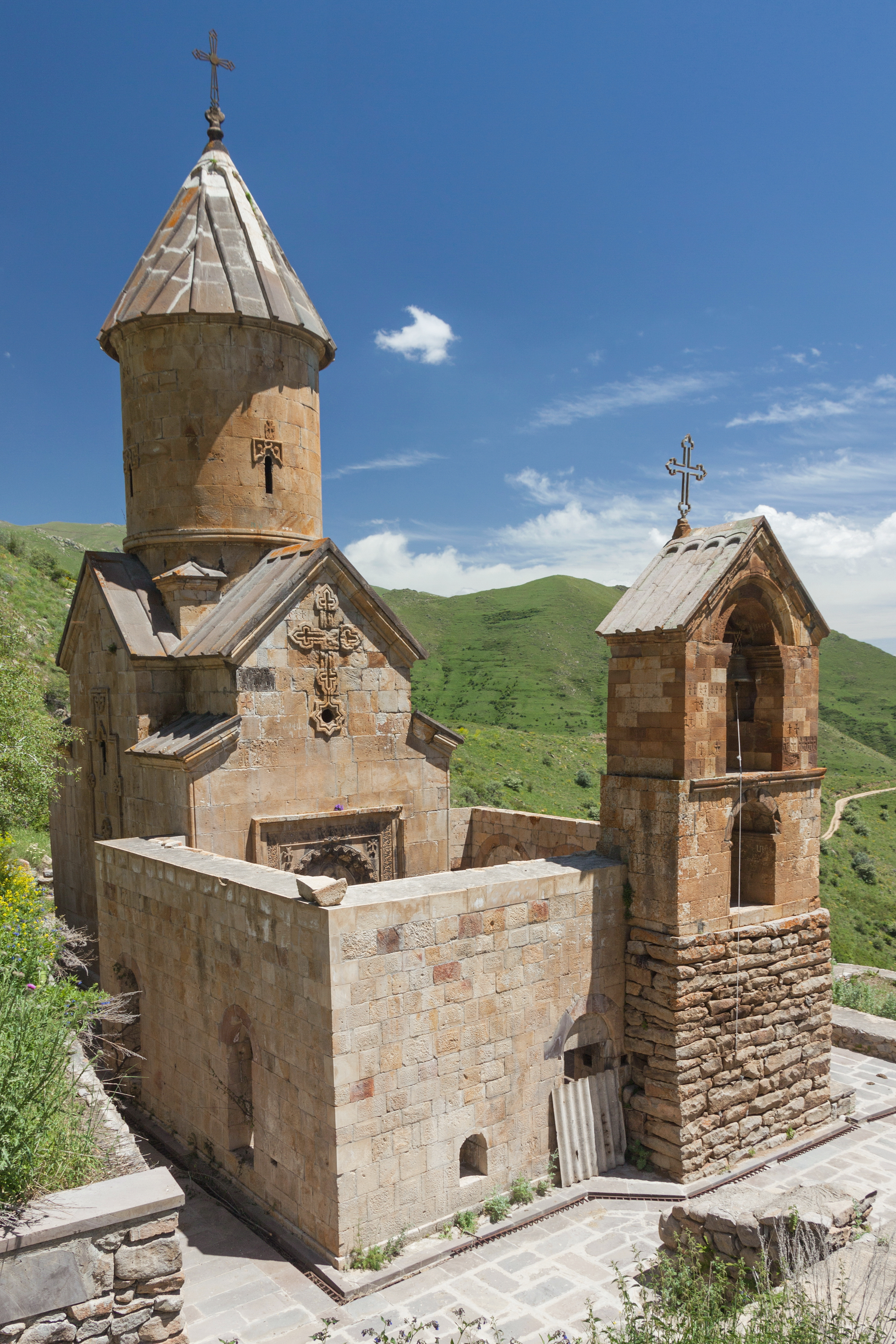
Spitakavor Monastery, built in 1321 by the Proshyan family.

The region held by the Proshyans enjoyed relative political stability and prosperity from the end of the 13th century to the early 14th century. In particular, the Syunik Province became a center of intellectual, literary and artistic creativity. Monastic institutions grew under the patronage of the Proshians and the Orbelians, who built numerous monasteries and provided them with various financial resources. Smbat Orbelian (1249/50-73) had obtained from Möngke Khan that monastic properties which had been seized should be returned, and that they would be free from taxation. This tax-exempt status, contrasting with the generally heavy taxation of private property under the Mongols, encouraged nobility to transfer part of their wealth for safeguarding to monastic institutions, either temporarily or permanently, all of this secured by Mongol edicts. In some cases, members of the nobility could become abbots, so as to secure the ownership and management of these ecclesiastical resources. The main holdings of the Proshyans were in the monasteries of Kecharuyk and Geghard, but they also contributed to the Aghjots Vank and the Tanahat Monastery (1273-1279).

The Proshians were also in strong competition with the Orbelians, which contributed to stimulating an impressive number of architectural commissions.

== Members of the dynasty ==
- Haghbak, father of Grigor and Vasak

- Prince Grigor Khaghbakian and his wife Zaz, builders of the Surp Stepanos church at Aghjots Vank in 1217.
- Vasak, brother of Grigor, father of Papak' (died in 1220-23), Mkde'm, and Hasan (called "Prosh").

- Prosh Khaghbakian (Hasan "Prosh" Khaghbakian, -1283, founder of the dynasty), husband of Khut'lu Khat'un, brother of Papak' and Mkde'm.
  - His son Vasak (died 1268–1273).
  - His son Amir Hasan I (ruled 1284-1292), wife T‘acher.
  - His son Papak Proshian (died 1288), wife Ruzukan.
  - His son Mkde'm.
- Eachi Proshian (1268/73-1318), son of Amir Hasan I, grandson of Prosh Khaghbakian.
  - His son, Amir Hasan II.
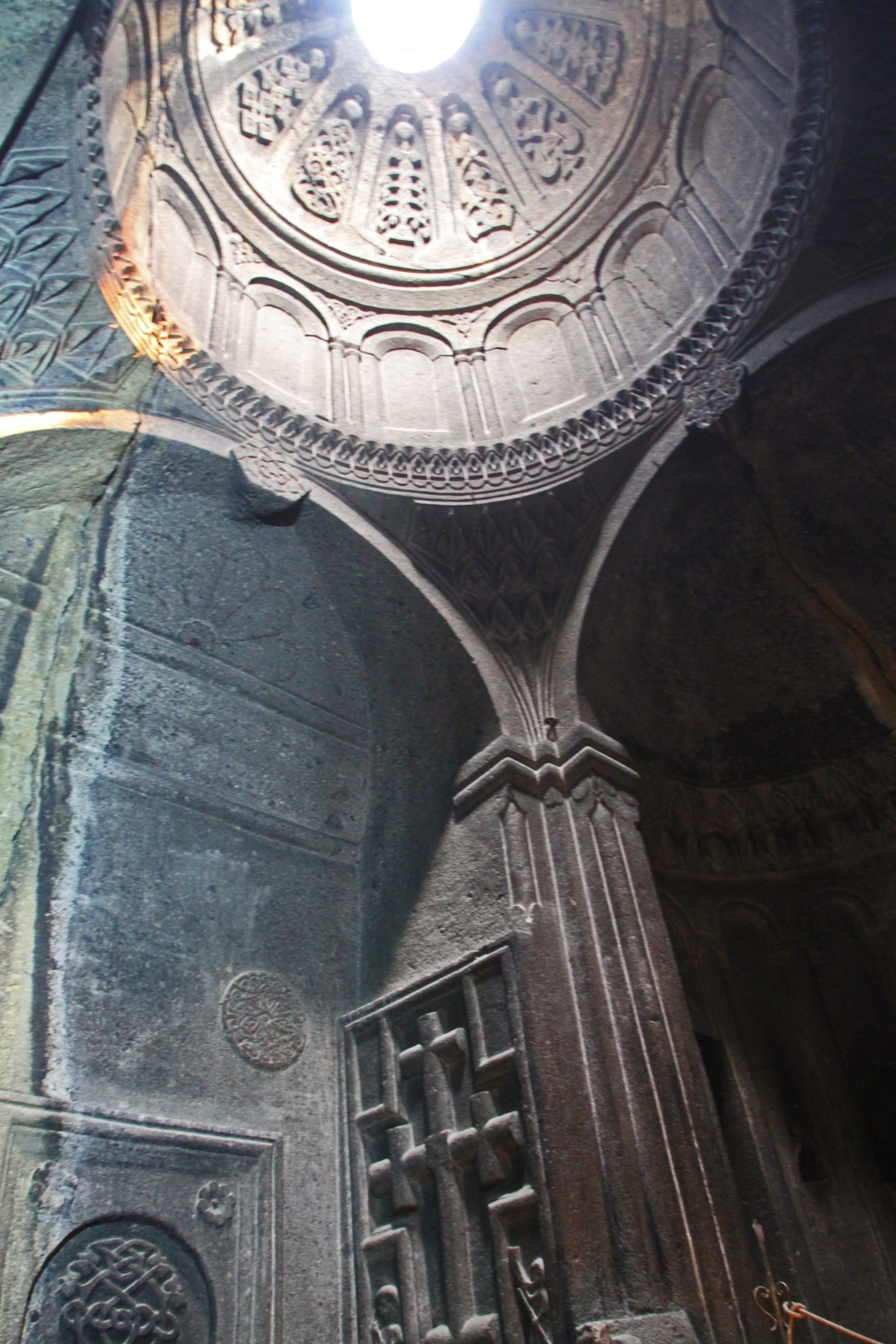
The "Chapel of the Proshyans" in Geghard was dedicated by Prince Prosh in 1283.

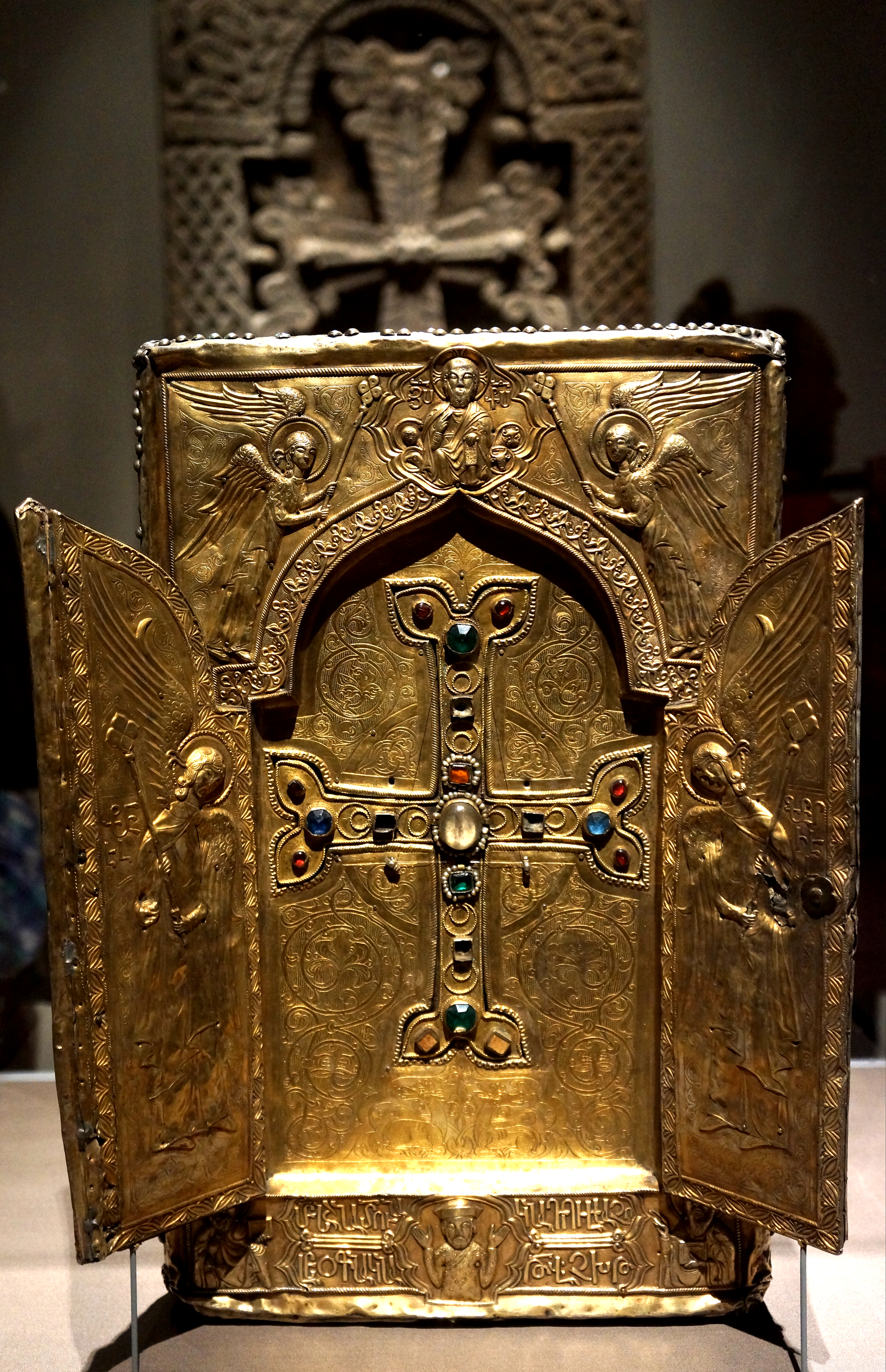
Reliquary of the "Holy Cross of the Vegetarians" (Khotakerats) (1300, donor- Prince Eacch'i Proshian).

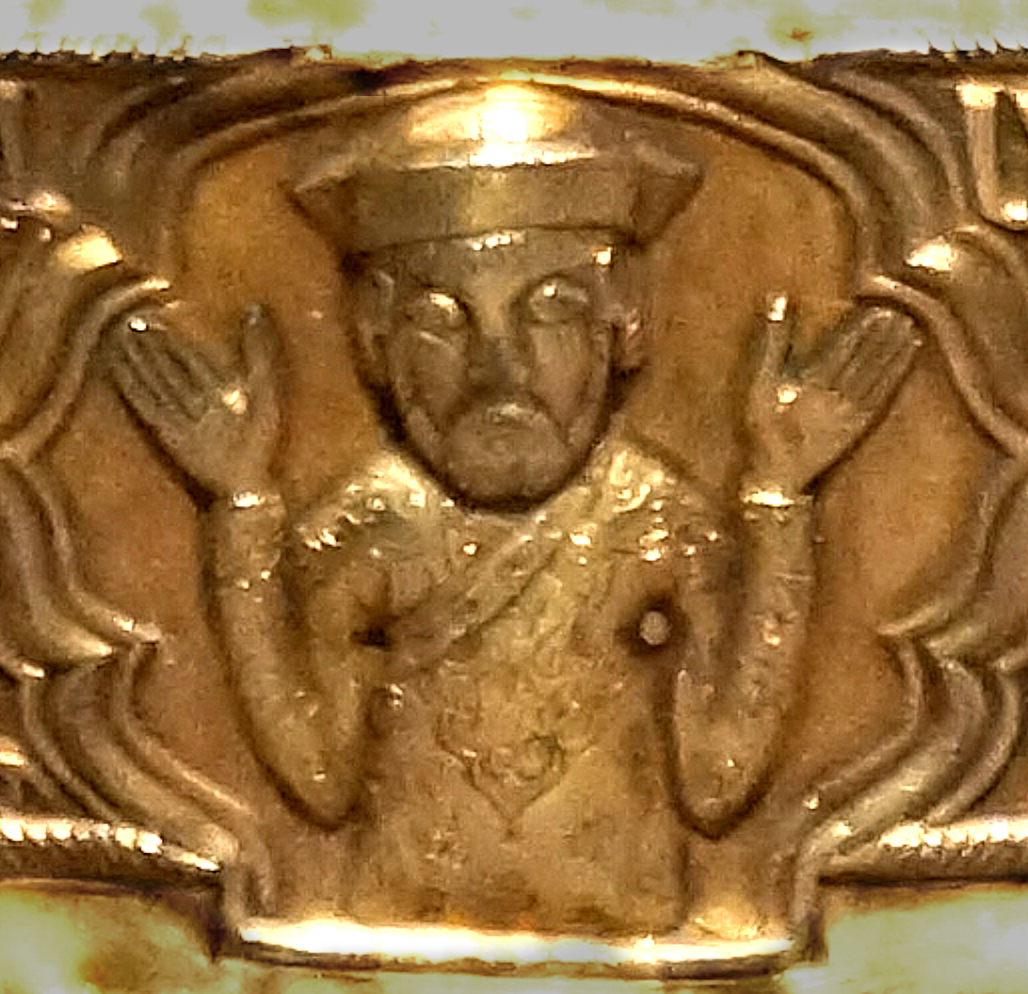
Prince Eacchi Proshian on his reliquary, circa 1300. He is wearing a Mongol-style dress (cloud collar and Mongol hat).

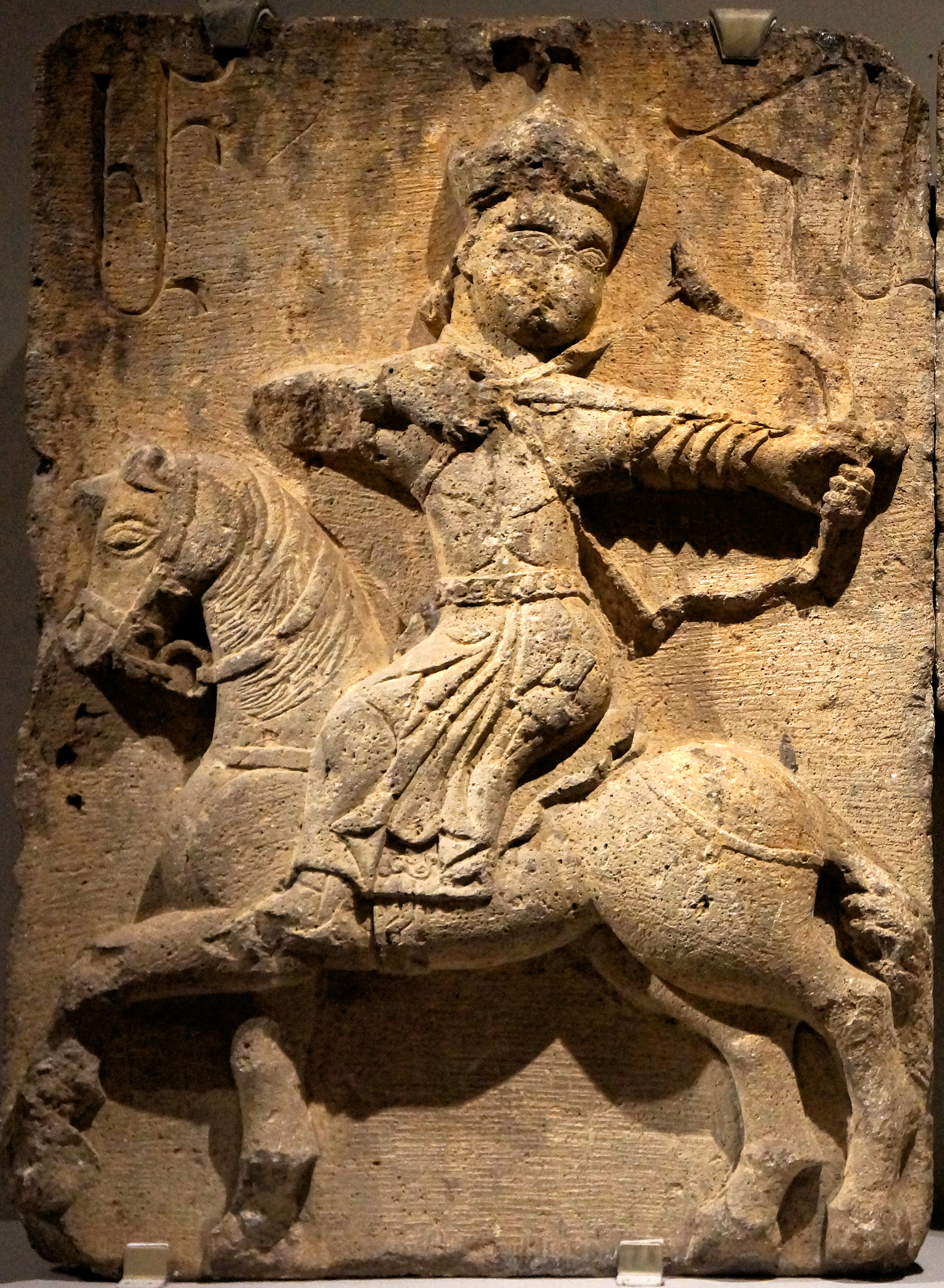
Amir Hasan II (letters ԱՄՐ ՀՍ "AMR HS") hunting on horseback in Mongol attire, Church of the White Virgin (completed 1321). History Museum of Armenia, Yerevan.

== Genealogy ==
family tree of Proshyans

Haghbak
Avag | Grigor
Prosh | Papak‘ | Mkde‘m
Vasak | Amir Hasan I | Papak‘ | Mkde‘m
Eachi
Amir Hasan II
