= Grigor Khaghbakian =

Prince of Kingdom of Georgia

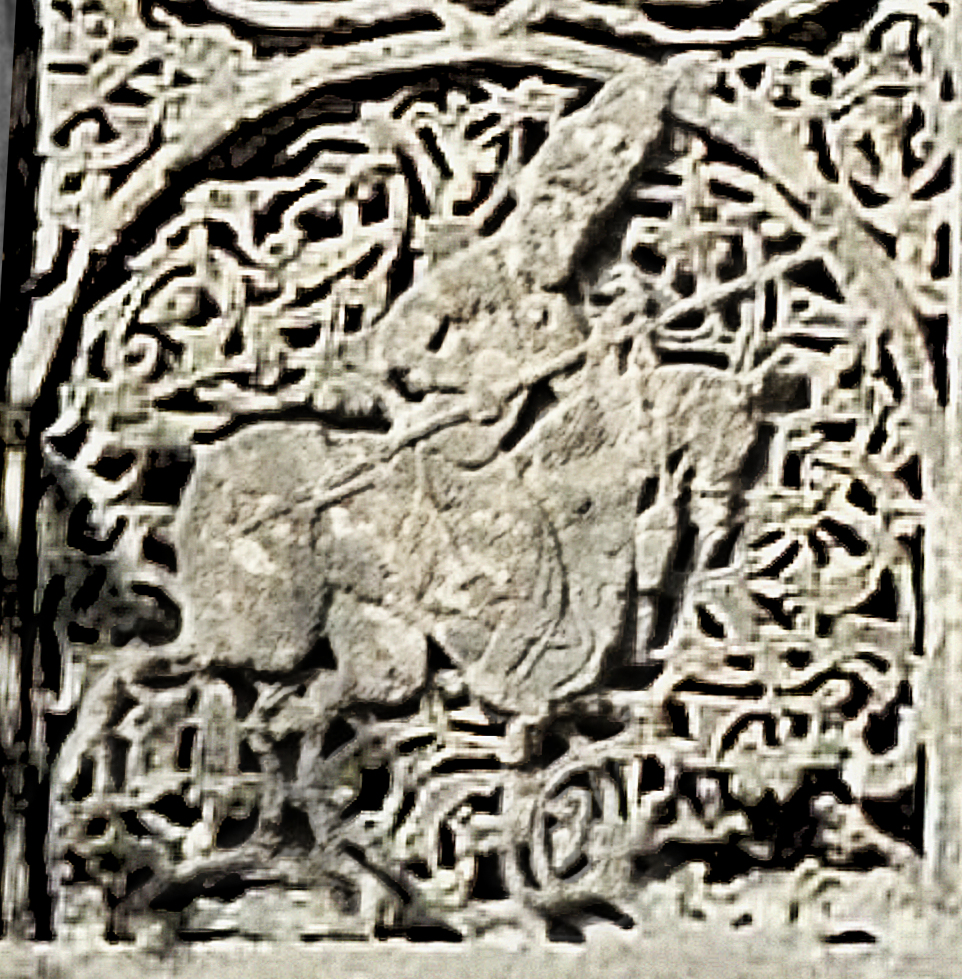
The donator on horse, in the khatchkar of Grigor Khaghbakian (1233).

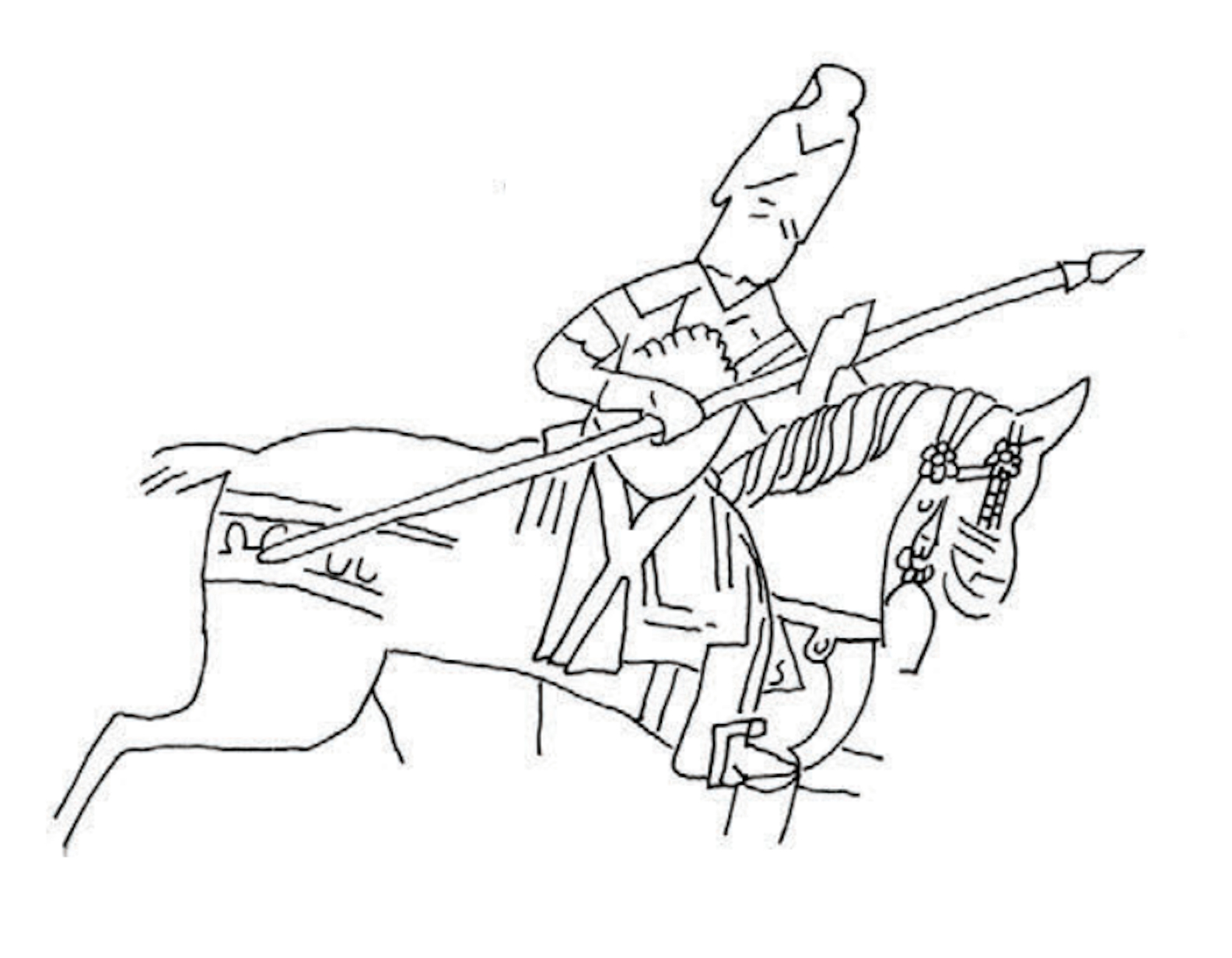
Carved relief on the Cross of Grigor Khaghbakian, Armenian, 1233 CE. Religious complex of the Mother See of the Holy Etchmiadzin Cathedral, Vagharshapat.

Grigor Khaghbakian (died in 1220–1223) was a Prince of the Armenian Khaghbakian family in the province of Zakarid Armenia, Kingdom of Georgia. Together with his wife Zaz, he built the Surp Stepanos church at Aghjots Vank in 1217.

Grigor Khaghbakian is also known for a 1233 khatchkar with a sacred image, now in Etchmiadzin Cathedral, where it was brought from Imirzek.

The 13th century Armenian historian Kirakos Gandzaketsi reports that some time after a 1220 Mongol incursion under Subutai, the Kipchaks came to the Armenian city of Gandzak between 1220 and 1223, where they encountered the troops of King Lasha of Georgia and his atabeg Ivane. Although the Georgians ultimately prevailed, Grigor Khaghbakian was captured and tortured to death by the Kipchak Turks:

[The Qipchags] seized, among others, Grigor (son of Haghbak, brother of brave Vasak) and his brother's son Papak'; for Vasak had three sons: Papak', Mkdem, and Hasan (called Prhosh), brave and distinguished men who had caused all the Tachik troops to quake with fear. They killed Papak' in battle. As for Grigor, they arrested him and tormented him with numerous tortures to make him deny Christ, but he did not do so. On the contrary, he insulted their deceiving law-giver Mahmet and their loathsome faith even more. [Grigor's captors] grew angry and dragged him naked over the earth and lacerated his entire body with thorns and so tortured him that he gave up the ghost because of the beatings, receiving a martyr's crown from Christ. These men were from Xach'en district of a prominent family, Christians, orthodox, and of Armenian nationality. The impious Iranians oppressed many other captives with various tortures, keeping them hungry, thirsty, and naked.

— History of Armenia, Kirakos Gandzaketsi.

Grigor Khaghbakian was son of Haghbak, brother of Vasak Khaghbakian, and uncle of Prosh Khaghbakian, founder of the Proshyan dynasty.

The Khachqar cross dedicated by Grigor Khaghbakian in 1233, now located near Etchmiadzin Cathedral, is considered as one of the finest, with its detailed and refined openwork sculpture. A fine Deesis decorated the entablature, and the donator appears on horse at the bottom, a rare occurrence as such crosses are not often decorated with human depictions.

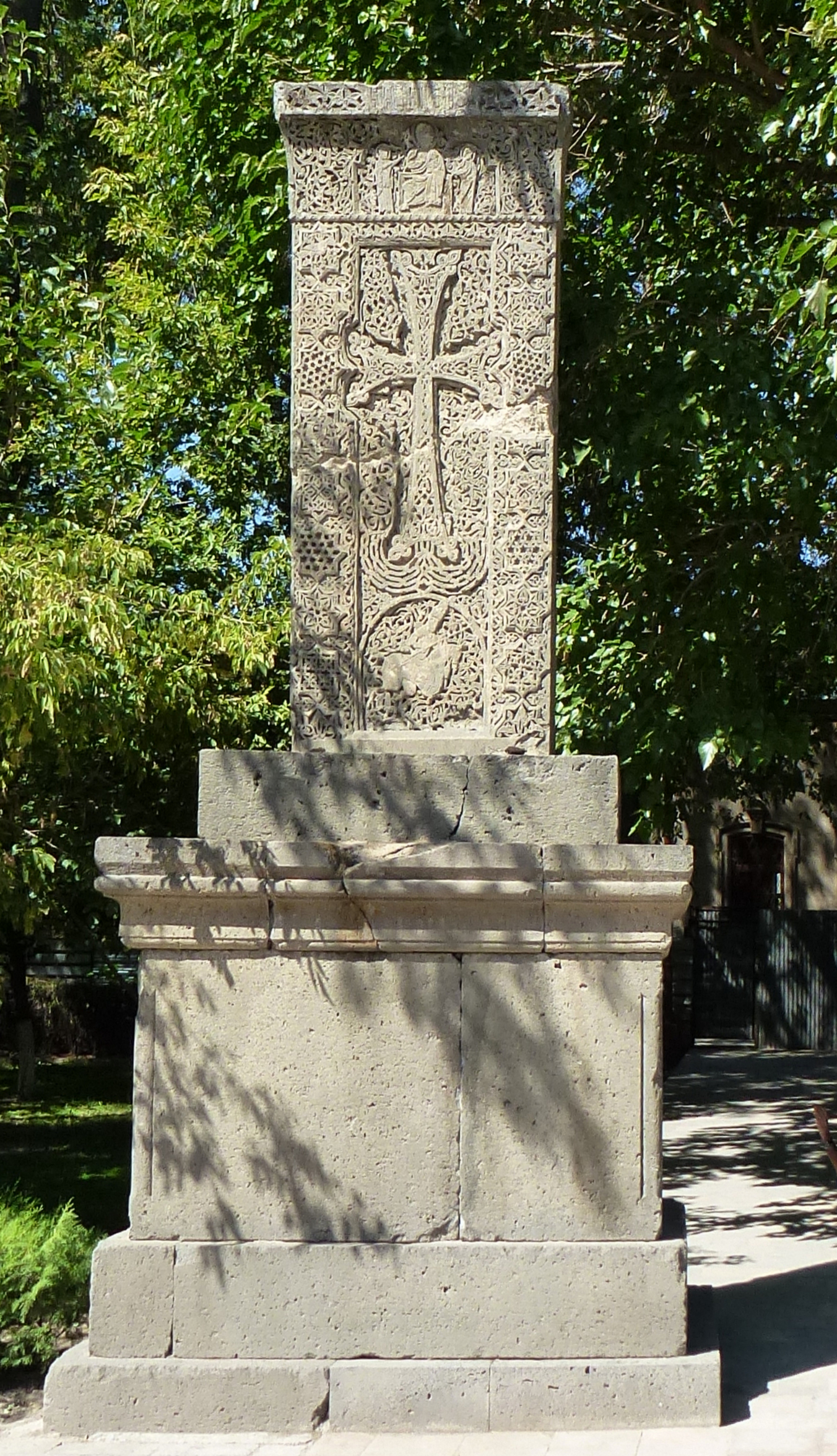
Khachqar of Grigor Khaghbakian, near Etchmiadzin Cathedral (1233).

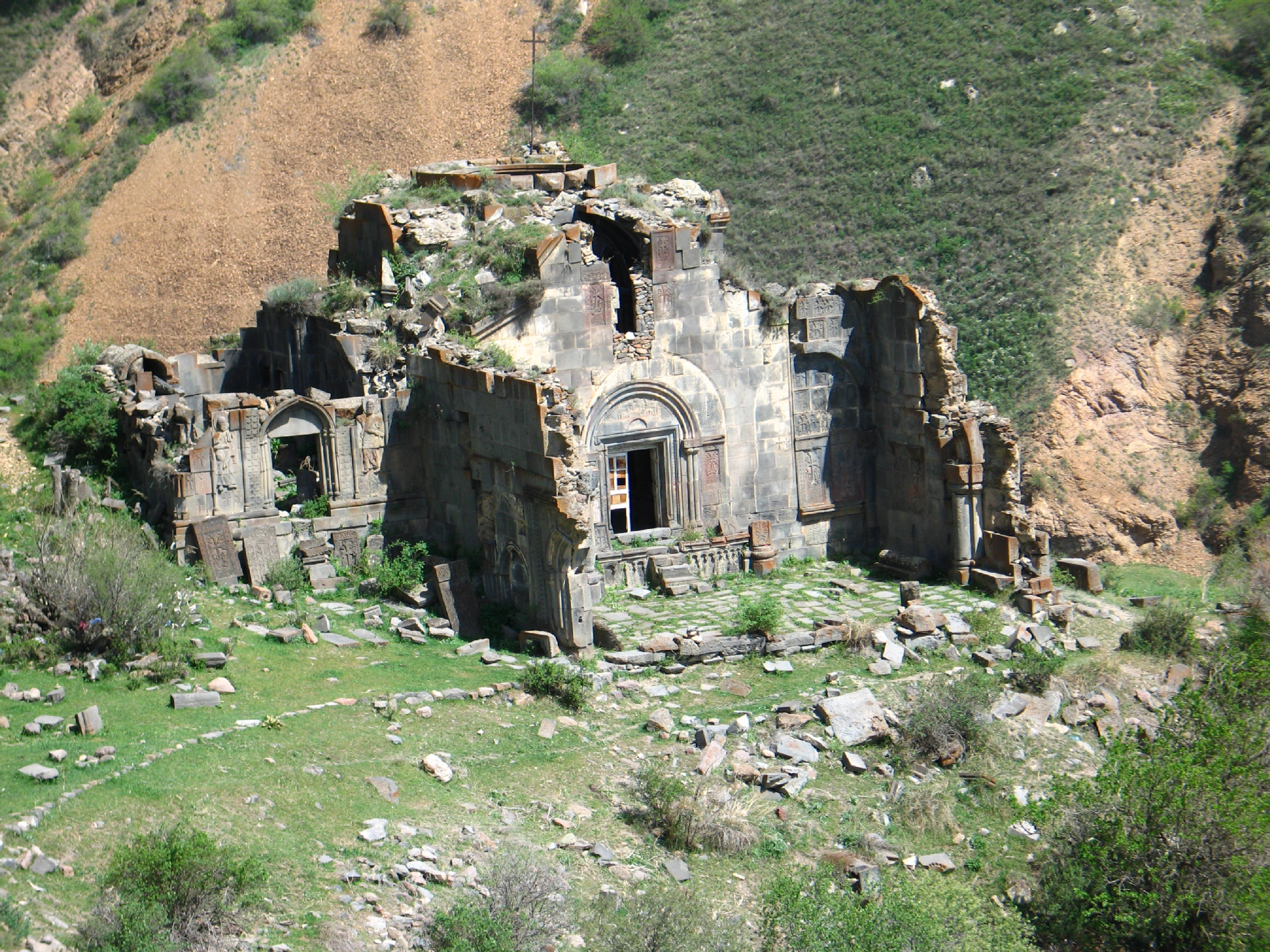
Surp Stepanos church at Aghjots Vank (1217).

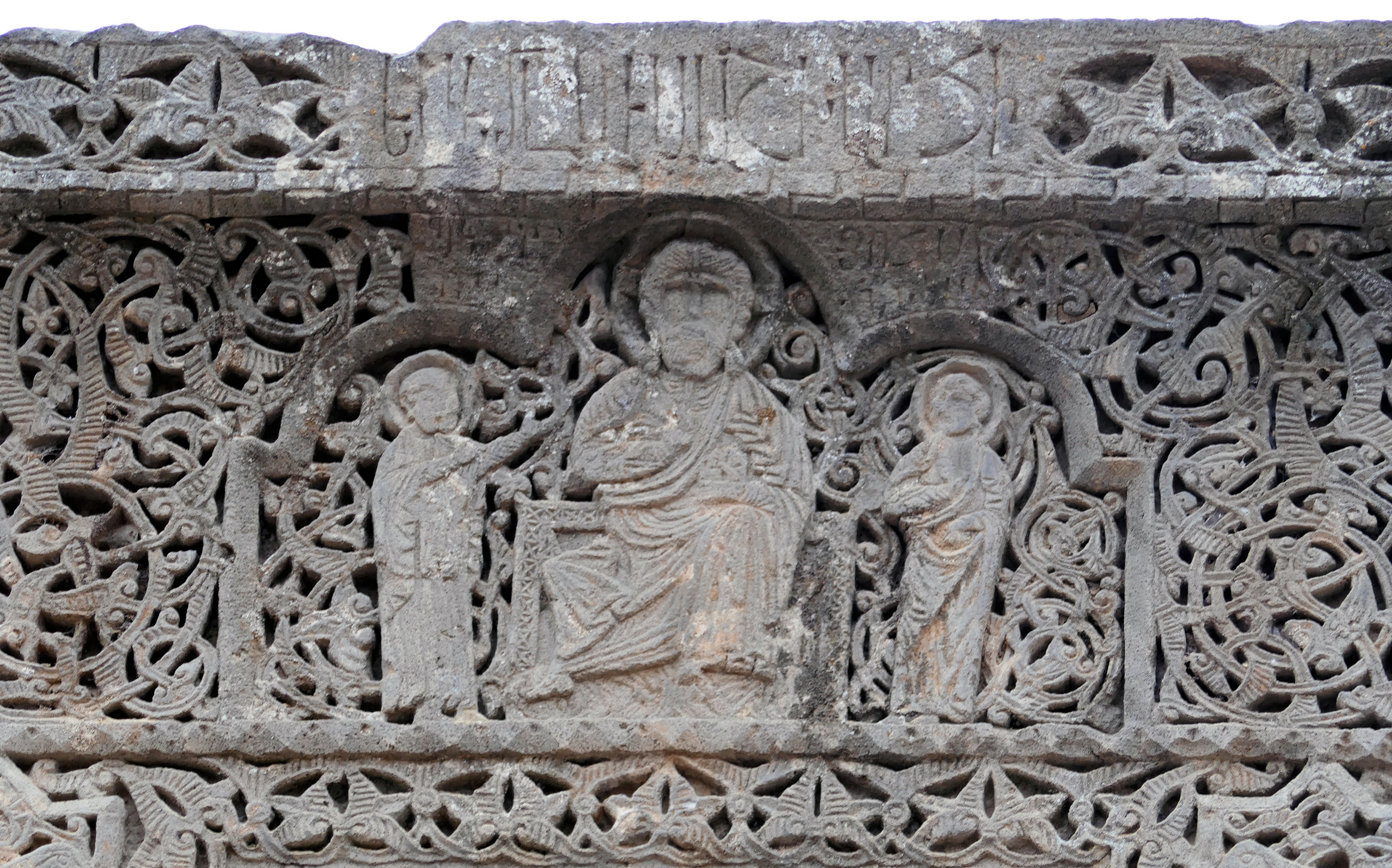
Christ detail on the Khachqar of Grigor Khaghbakian (1233).
