= Gandzak =

Gandzak may refer to several places:

- Gandzak, Armenia, a village in Armenia
- The old Armenian name for Ganja, Azerbaijan
- An alternative spelling of Ganzak, Iran
