= Boloraberd =

Boloraberd may refer to:

- Boloraberd, Armenia, a village in the Vayots Dzor Province
- Boloraberd Fortress, a fortress also known as Proshaberd
