= Kurdkulag =

Kurdkulag may refer to:

- Boloraberd, Armenia
- Ghurdghulagh, Armenia
