= Spitakavor Monastery =

Monastery in Vayots Dzor Province, Armenia

Coordinates: 39°49′47″N 45°21′48″E

Spitakavor Monastery Սպիտակավոր վանք
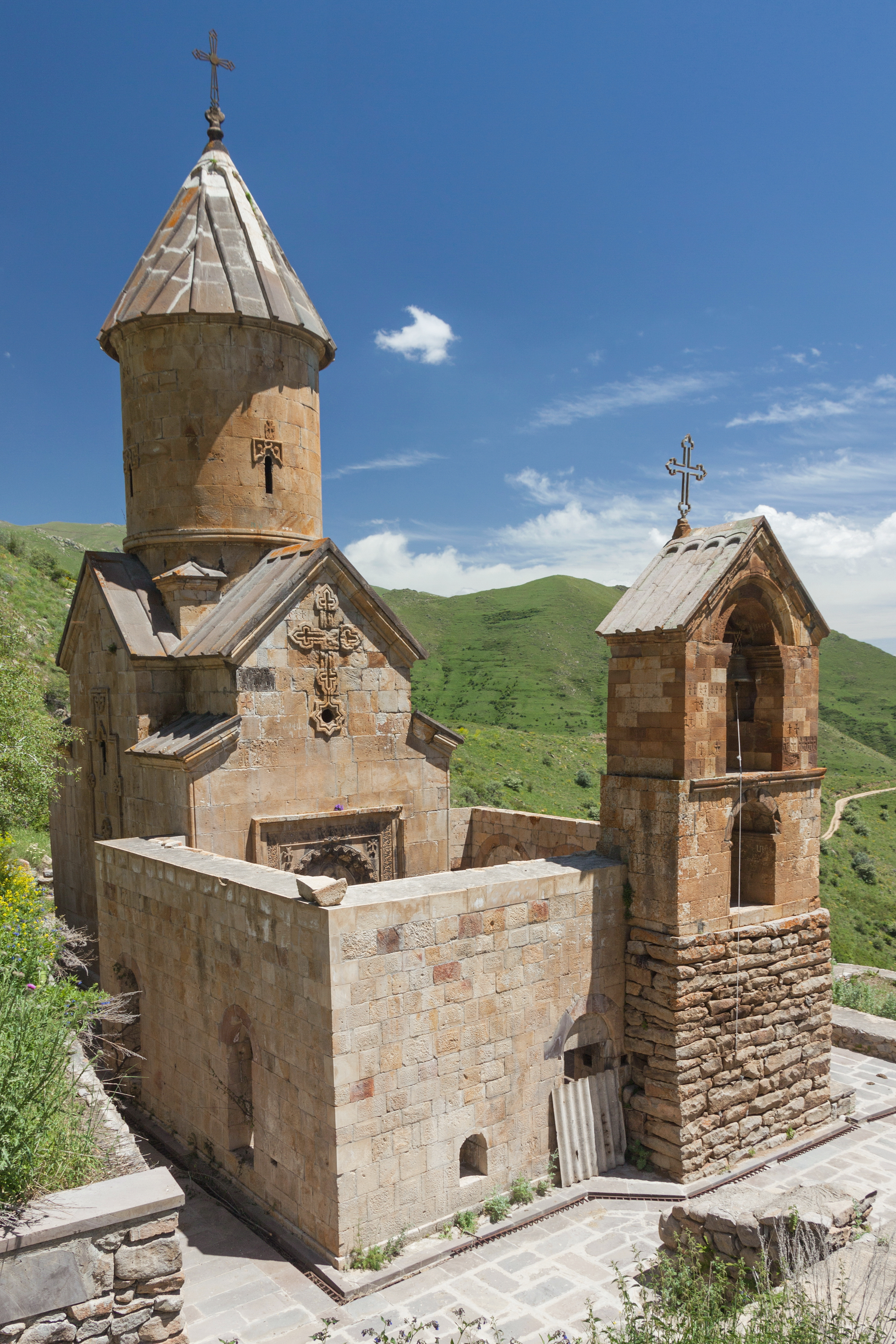
- Spitakavor Surp Astvatsatsin Monastery

- Location within Armenia Location within Vayots Dzor

Religion
- Affiliation: Armenian Apostolic Church

Location
- Location: near Vernashen, Vayots Dzor, Armenia

Architecture
- Style: Armenian
- Completed: 1321 (church), 1330 (vestibule, bell-tower)
- Dome: 1

Spitakavor Monastery (Armenian: Սպիտակավոր վանք, "White monastery"), is a 14th-century Armenian monastic complex, 7 kilometres (4.3 mi) north of Vernashen village, near the town of Yeghegnadzor of Vayots Dzor Province, Armenia.

== Geography ==
The Spitakavor Monastery is located on the slopes of Teksar mountain of the Vayots Dzor Province. The terrain is difficult, but the monastery can be reached on foot or with an all-terrain vehicle. It is about 8.4 kilometres (5.2 mi) from the University of Gladzor's Museum and Tanahat Monastery and about 6 kilometres (3.7 mi) to the Proshaberd fortress.

== Monastery and church ==
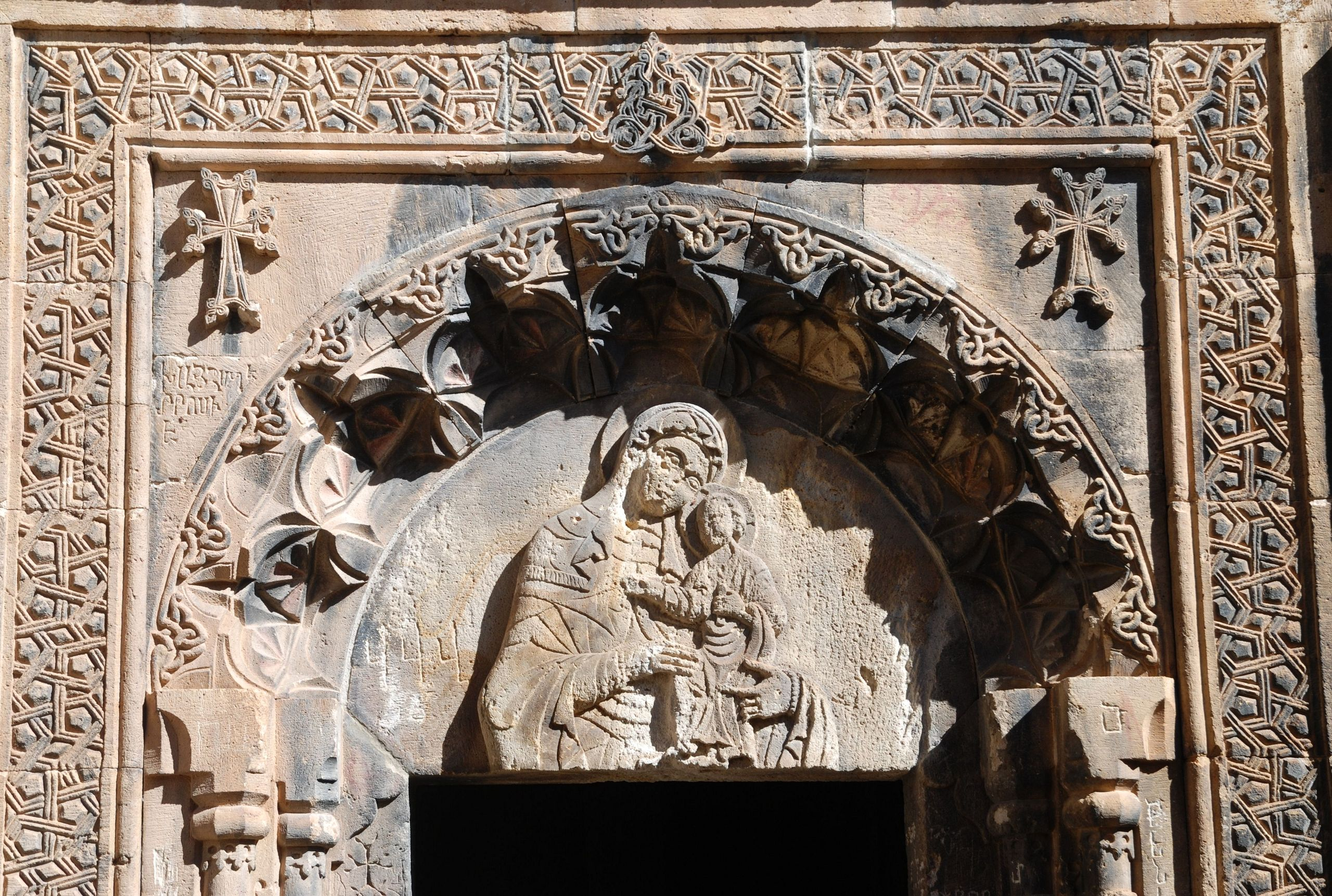
Church tympanum

Behind fortified walls lies buildings of white shaved (felsite, including the monastery, church, a bell-tower and vestibule.

Its main monument is the Spitakavor Church of the Holy Mother of God (Spitakavor Church of Surp Astvatsatsin). Due to the number of springtime flowers that surround the monastery, it is sometimes called Tsaghkavank (the Monastery of Flowers) by the villagers of Vernashen. An image, described as "a remarkable example of mid-century Armenian sculpture" of Mary (mother of Jesus), is chiseled into the headstone of the church's entrance. Other interesting artistic works included a sculpture of Jesus with his disciples and a relief of Eachi and his son. The History Museum of Armenia in Yerevan now holds a wall hanging that depicts Prince Hasan. The relief of the prince and his father is at the Hermitage Museum in Saint Petersburg, Russia.

Although the monastery is small and somewhat remote, it has been described as follows:

The monastery seems to be isolated from the entire world, and seems to be in the divine green surrounding where the human hand has yet not touched. Saying the harmony of the monastery and the nature around it is beautiful is not enough; “breathtakingly beautiful” this is how it should be described.

== History ==
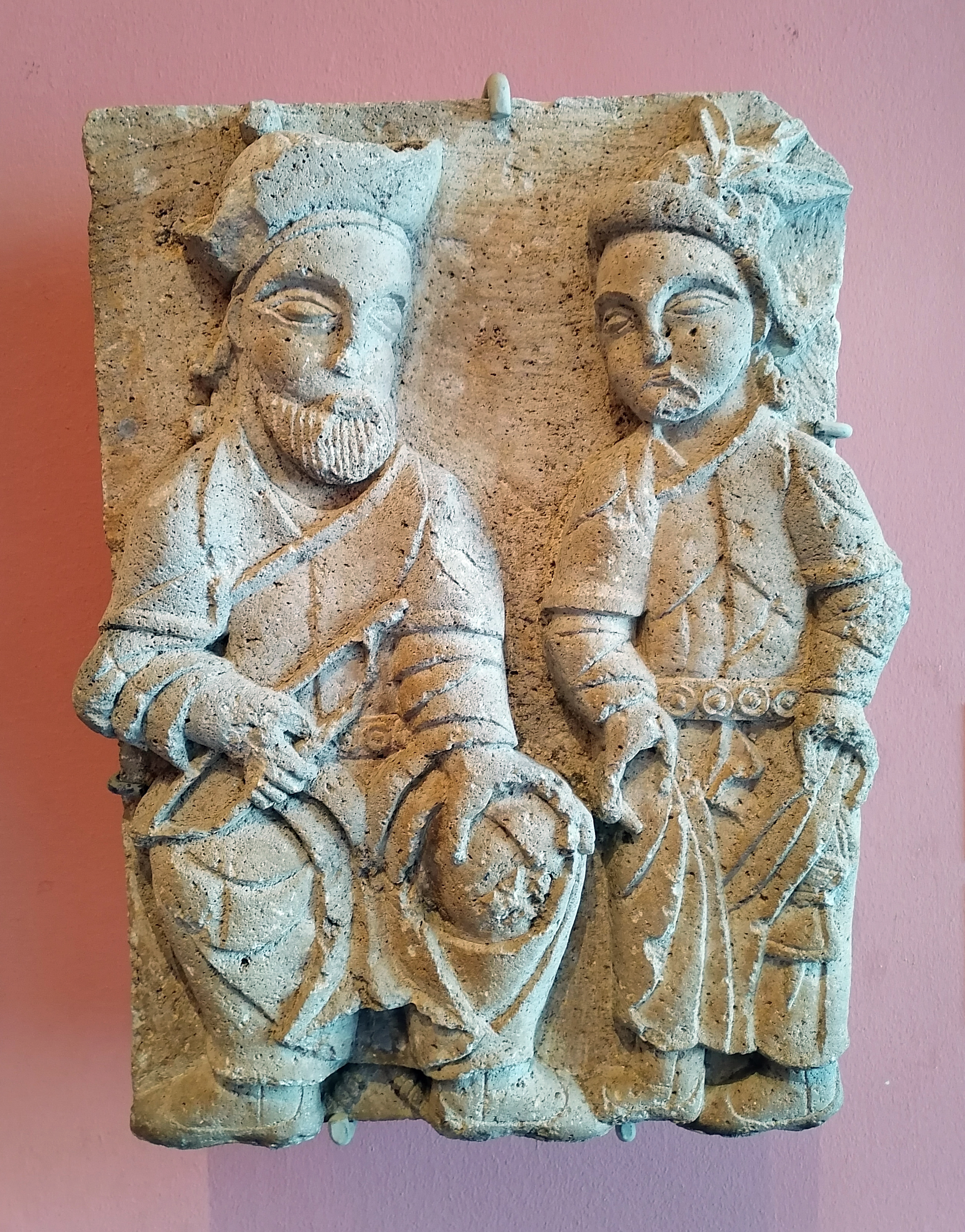
Relief depicting Eachi and Amir Hassan II of the Proshian dynasty, builders of the monastery, 14th century. Astvatsatsin Spitakavor Monastery, Vayots Dzor, Hermitage Museum, inv. No. AR-619.

The 14th-century Spitakavor Monastery was built by two princes from the Proshyan dynasty during the Zakarid Armenia period. The construction of the church began by Prince Eachi (died in 1318) and completed in 1321 by his son Prince Amir Hasan II. Between 1321 and 1330, the narthex was built, and in 1330 Hovhannes Proshian and his wife, Tadzna, added a three-story bell-tower to the western wall of narthex.

The monastery became an "important cultural, educational and spiritual center" under the guidance of Father Superior and Phililogist Vardapet Avagter. (Note: According to the Armenian Monuments Awareness Project, Spitakavor became an important center after the closing of the University of Gladzor, while it is also theorized that Spikakavor Monastery may have preceded and played a part in the closure in 1340 of the University of Gladzor.)

There were two other monasteries in the area, Tanade and St. Khach monasteries, and the three used fire signals to communicate in "ancient times". The monastery was attacked in the 14th century by Lenk Timur whose armies destroyed its walls and narthex, known in Armenia as gavit. In the 14th or 15th century, after the fall of the Mongols, Ak-Koyunlu and Kara Koyunlu tribes attacked and "devastated" the region, including the monastery church gavit, monastery defense walls, and service building. Without restoration of the destroyed buildings and walls, the church of the monastery stood until the Persian-Ottoman War when in 1604 thousands of Armenians were forcibly resettled under Shah Abbas.

The church and the remains of the monastery remain. Information panels in Armenian, Russian, Italian, French and English were installed for visitors.

== Garegin Nzhdeh ==
The remains of the Armenian military leader and political thinker Garegin Nzhdeh were secretly buried in the yard of Spitakavor Monastery on 9 May 1987 or in 1983. He had died in a Soviet prison in 1955. Annually on June 17 Armenians across the world conduct a pilgrimage to the monastery's graveyard. His tomb's cross stone was sculpted by Gegham Sahakyan.

== Gallery ==
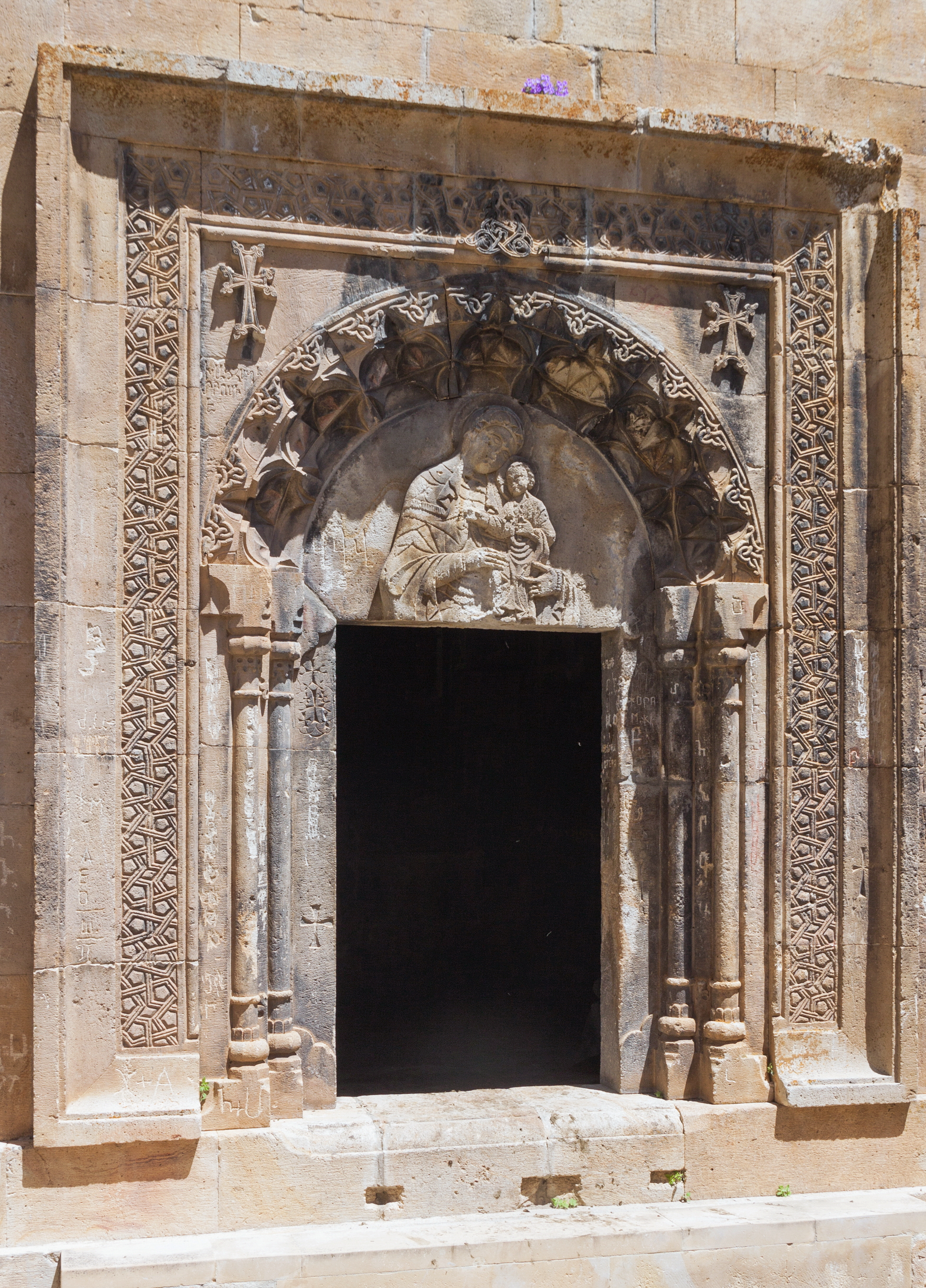
Portal

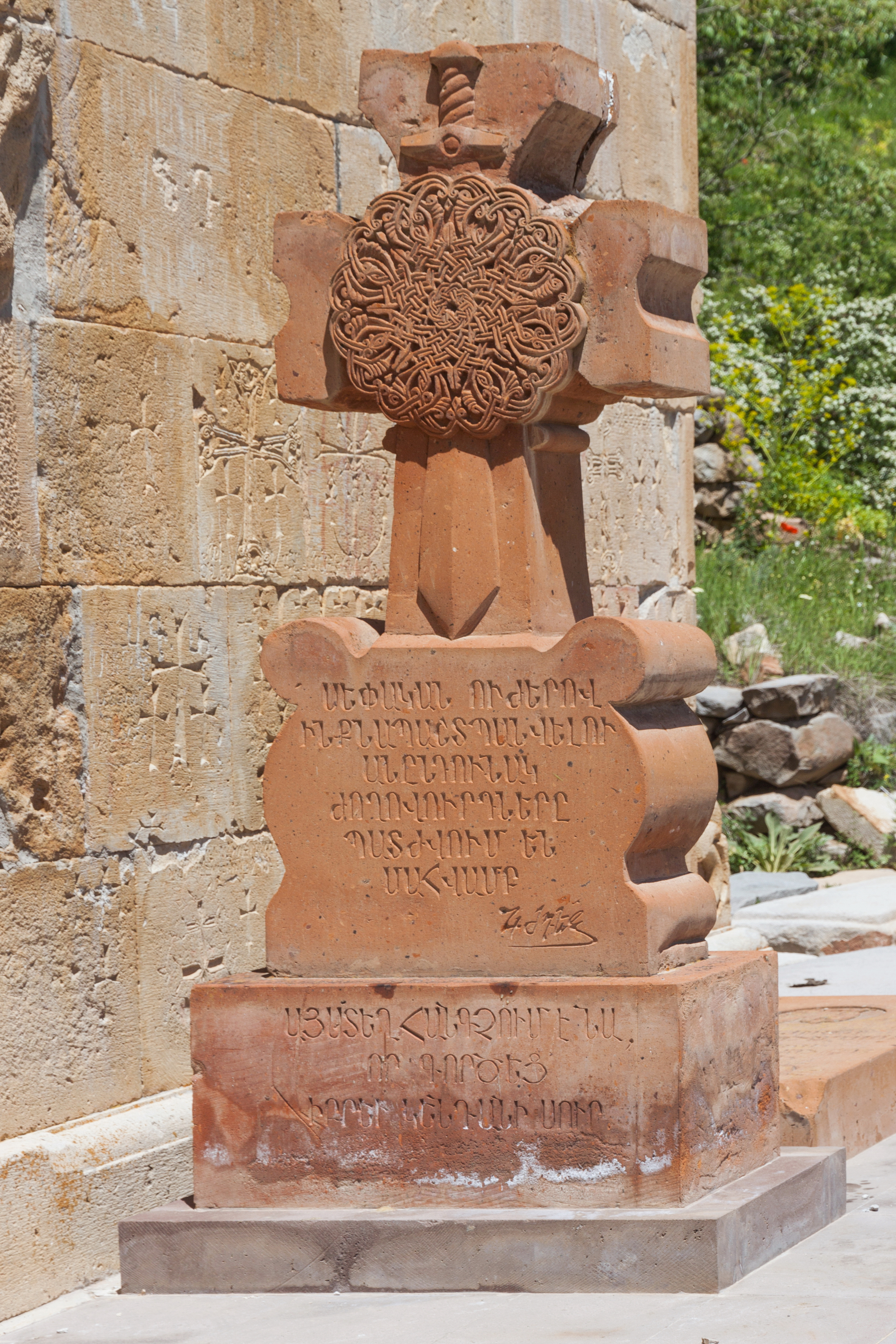
Cross by the tomb of Garegin Nzhdeh

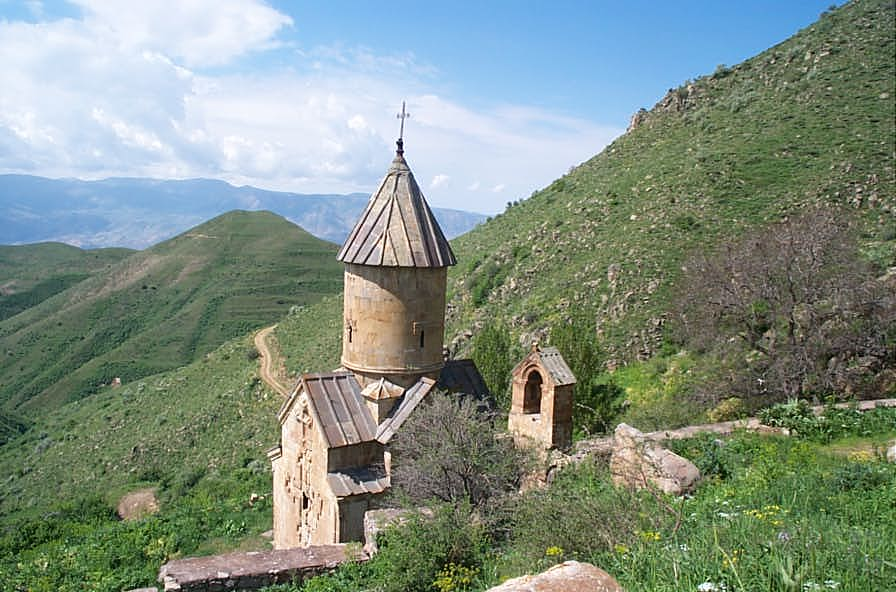
Spitakavor Monastery

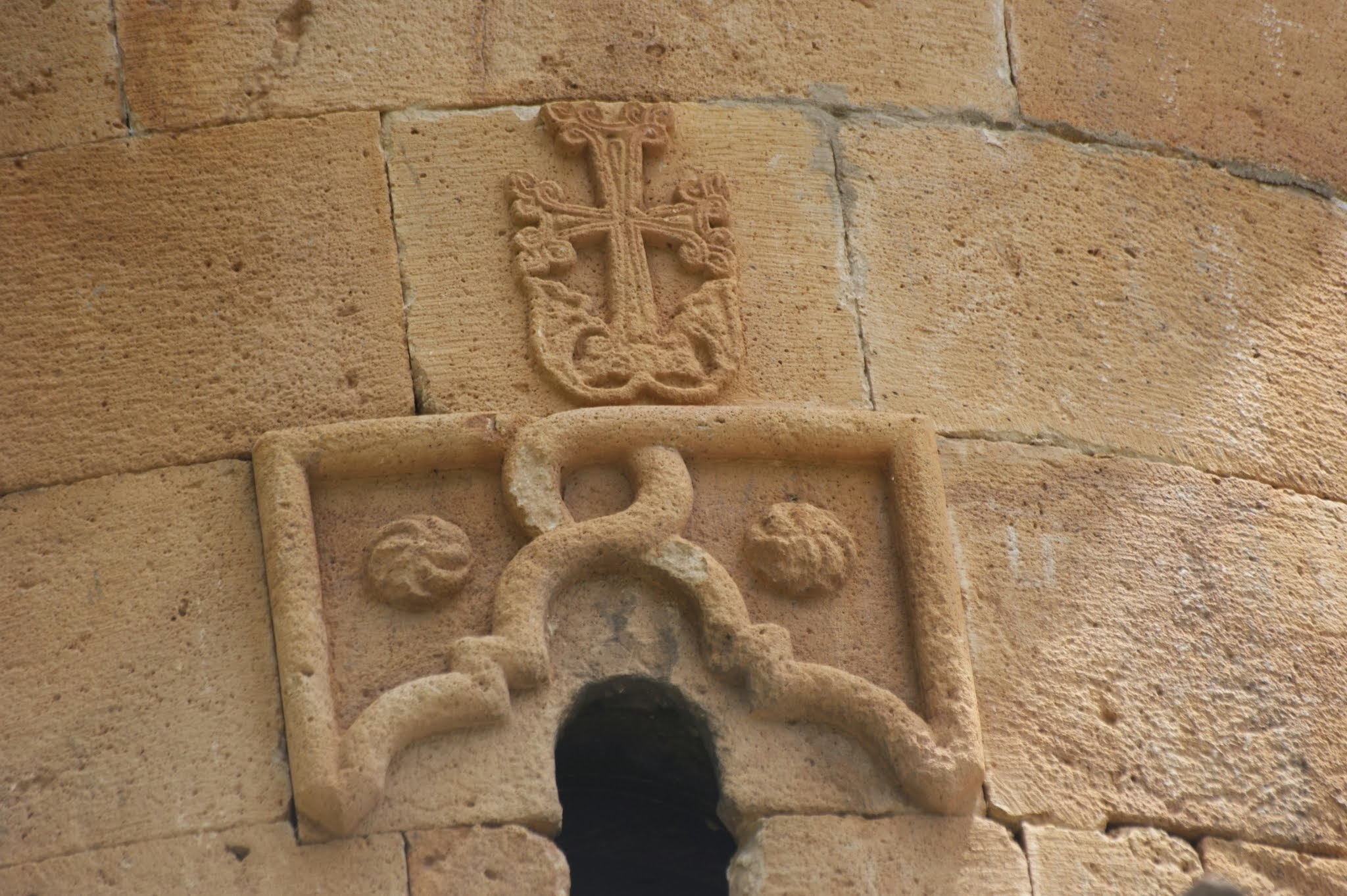
Armenian eternity sign

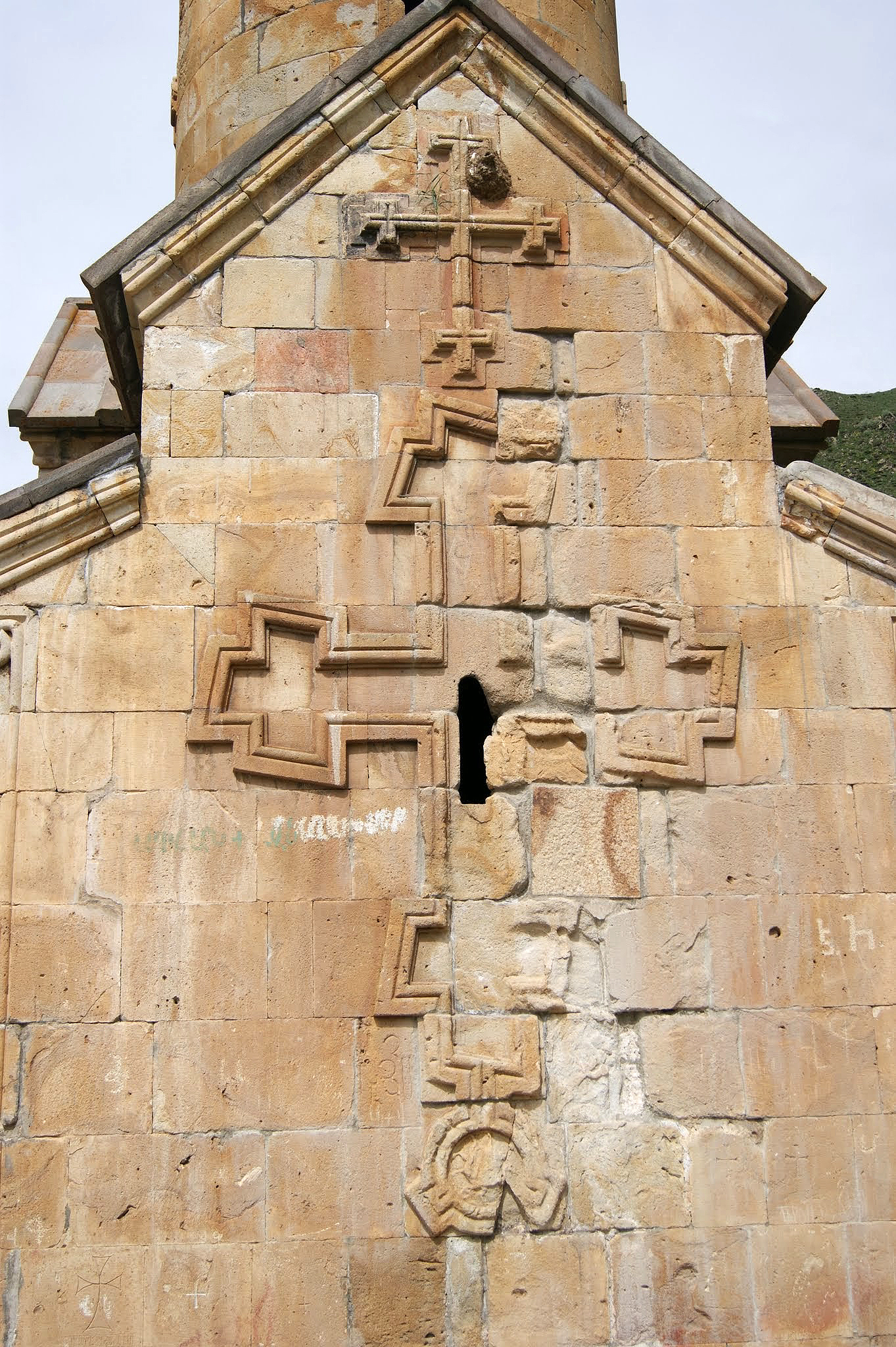
Cross on Spitakavor walls

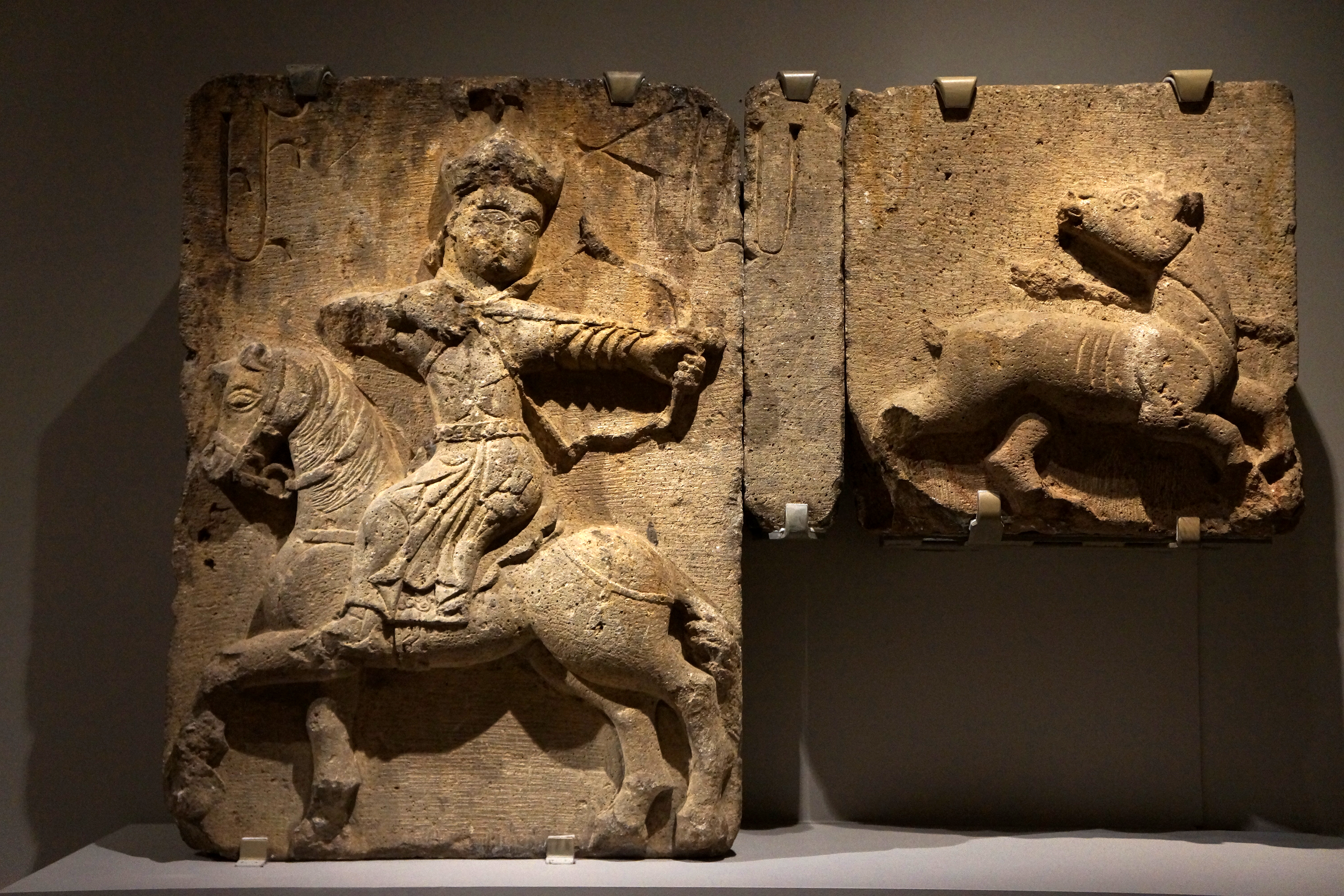
Amir Hasan II hunting on horseback, from the southern wall of the Church of the White Virgin (completed 1321). History Museum of Armenia, Yerevan.

== See also ==
- Proshaberd
