= Amir Hasan II =

Armenian Proshyan dynasty ruler

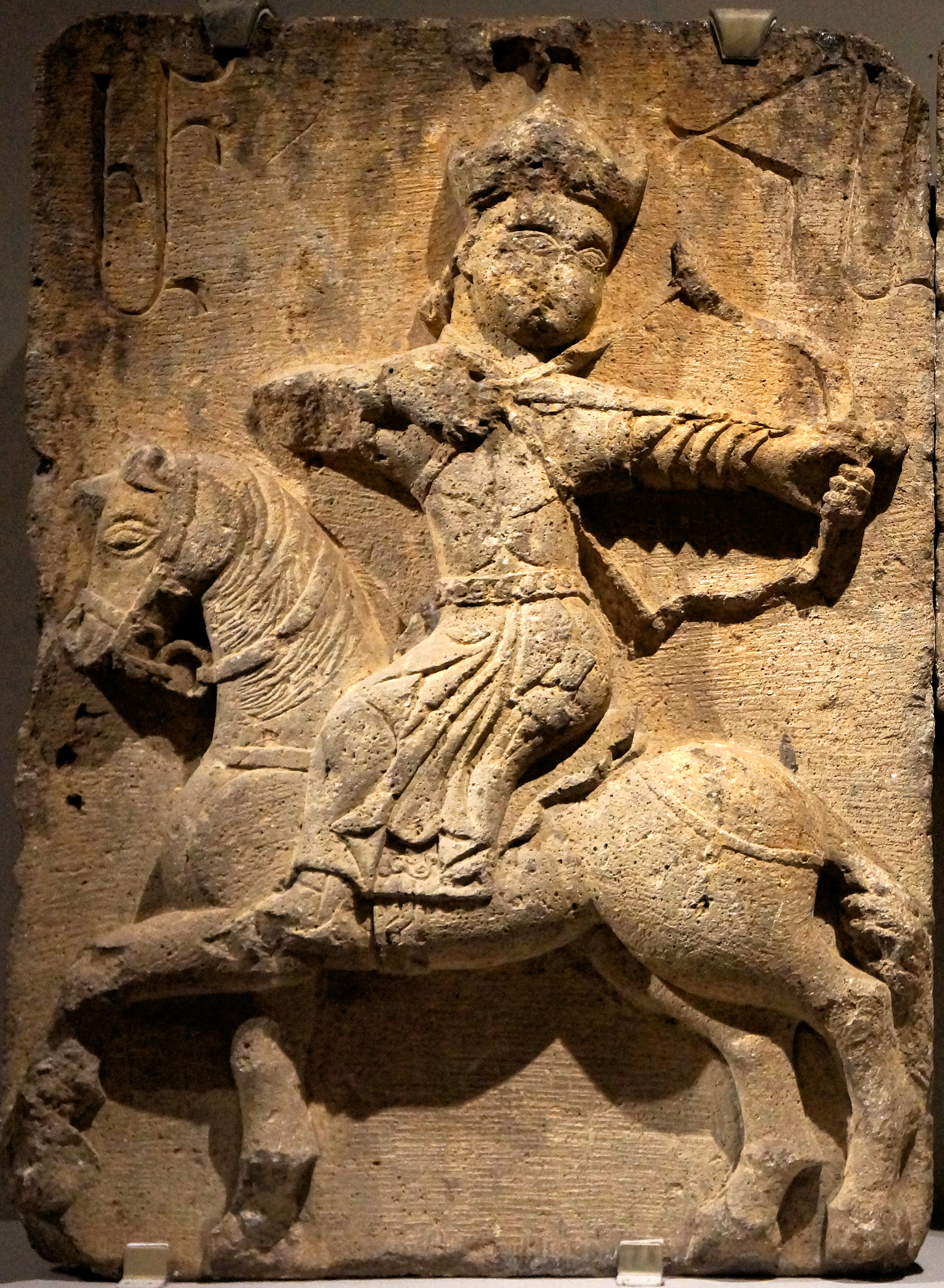
Amir Hasan II (letters ԱՄՐ ՀՍ "AMR HS") hunting on horseback in Mongol attire, Church of the White Virgin (completed 1321). History Museum of Armenia, Yerevan.

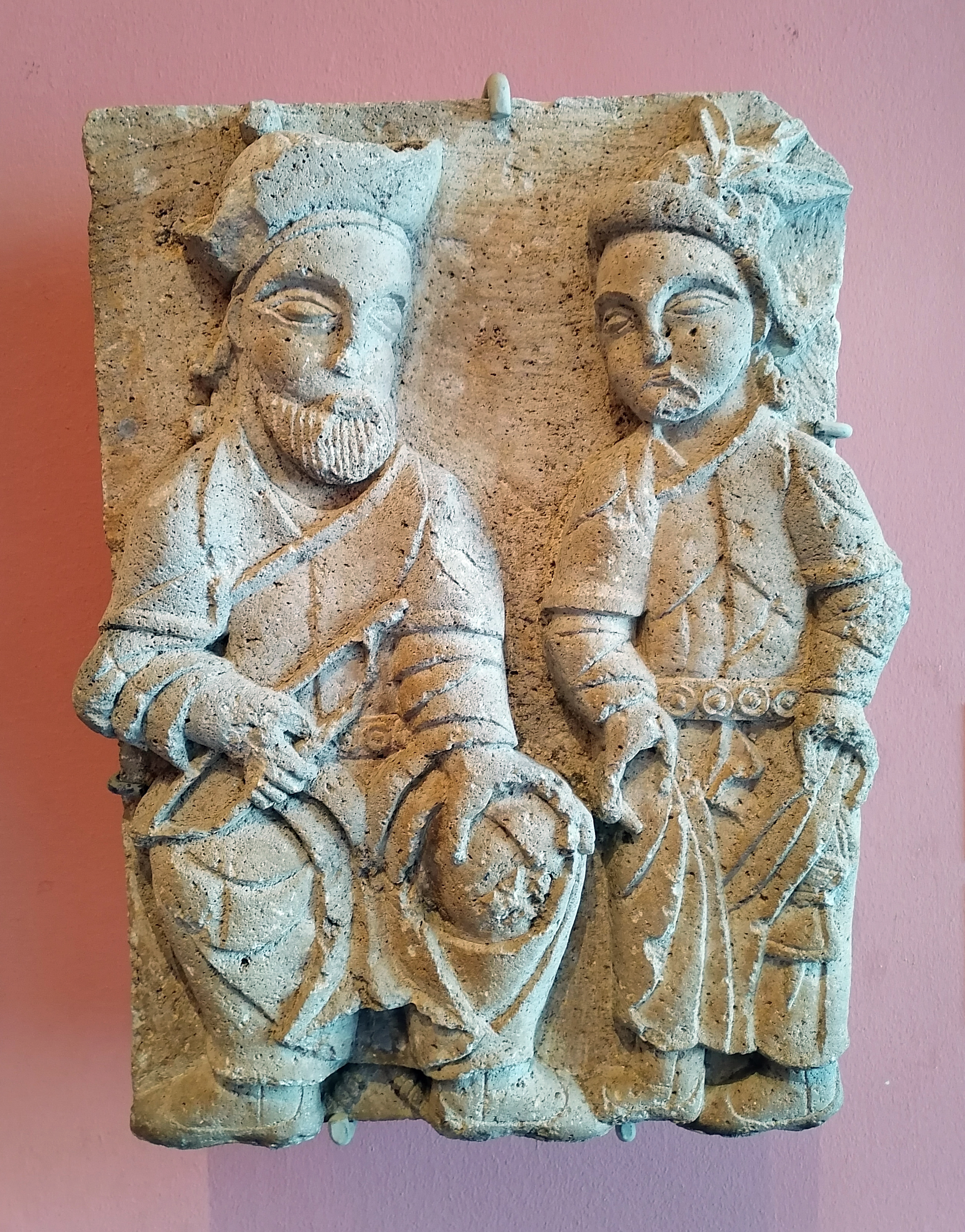
Relief depicting Eachi and Amir Hassan II of the Proshian dynasty ("a portrait identified by scholars as the father and son together"), c. 1321. Astvatsatsin Spitakavor Monastery, Vayots Dzor, Hermitage Museum, inv. No. AR-619.

Amir Hasan II (ruled 1317–1351) was a ruler of the Armenian Proshyan dynasty. He was the son of Eachi Proshian (1268/73-1318), himself a grandson of Prosh Khaghbakian, 13th century founder of the Proshyan dynasty. He was active in the region of Vayots Dzor and northern Siwnik.

Amir Hasan II is especially known for completing in 1321 the Spitakavor Monastery, which had been started by his father in 1318. Amir Hasan II is depicted in two reliefs from Spitakavor, one showing him sitting with his father.

Another relief represents him on horseback in princely attire with a bow, with the letters ԱՄՐ ՀՍ (AMR HS), indicating Prince Amir Hasan. The relief is dated to 1320–1322, date the church was completed. In these depictions, the Proshyans wear close-fitting clothing with an ornate belt and tall hats, and have round cheeks and almond-shaped eyes in a style characteristic of Mongol-era Armenia. Riding a horse, Prince Amir Hasan wears a close-fitting tunic and a three-pointed hat with two ribbons, characteristic of 14th century Mongol nobility, and his facial features are similar to those of the Mongols. Prince Eacchi Proshian on his reliquary, dated circa 1300, is shown wearing a Mongol-style royal dress (cloud collar).

Nominally under the rule of the Kingdom of Georgia, the Proshians has effectively submitted to the Mongols since 1236 in exchange for keeping their lands and paying high taxes to the conqueror, and in 1256 were effectively incorporated into the Mongol Ilkhanate together with the rest of historical Armenia.

A colophon from a manuscript redacted in 1321 in the Monastery of Glajor mentions Amir Hasan II and harsh Mongol rule:

This was copied in the year 770 of our Haykazean Era [a.d. 1321], in bitter and evil times, when the nation of archers [azgn netolac‘] held under tyrannical sway all of Armenia and Georgia, during the reign of King Gorgen (Giorgi V) of the Georgians [Vrac‘], and of our heir-apparent King Lewon (Leon IV of Cilicia) of Armenia Major [Hayoc' Mecac']; and during the pontificate of the Lord Kostandin [Constantin III of Cesarea], and the overseership of the Lord Yovhanes and the Lord Step'anos in our province of Siwnik'; and during the generalship and principality of Burt'el and Amir Hasan in our cantons...

— Gospel by scribe Kiwrion, Monastery of Glajor

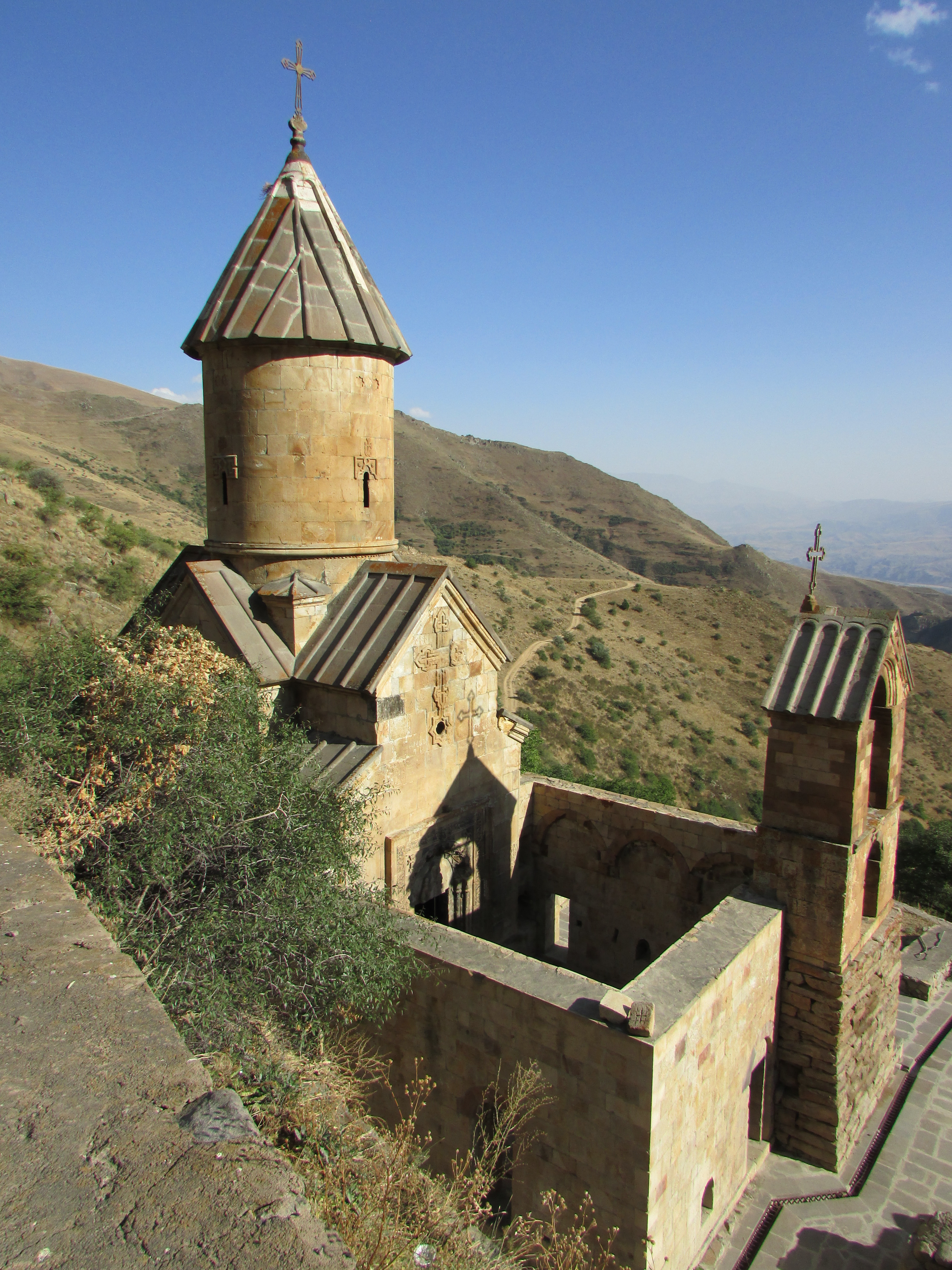
Spitakavor Monastery, completed by Amir Hasan II in 1321.

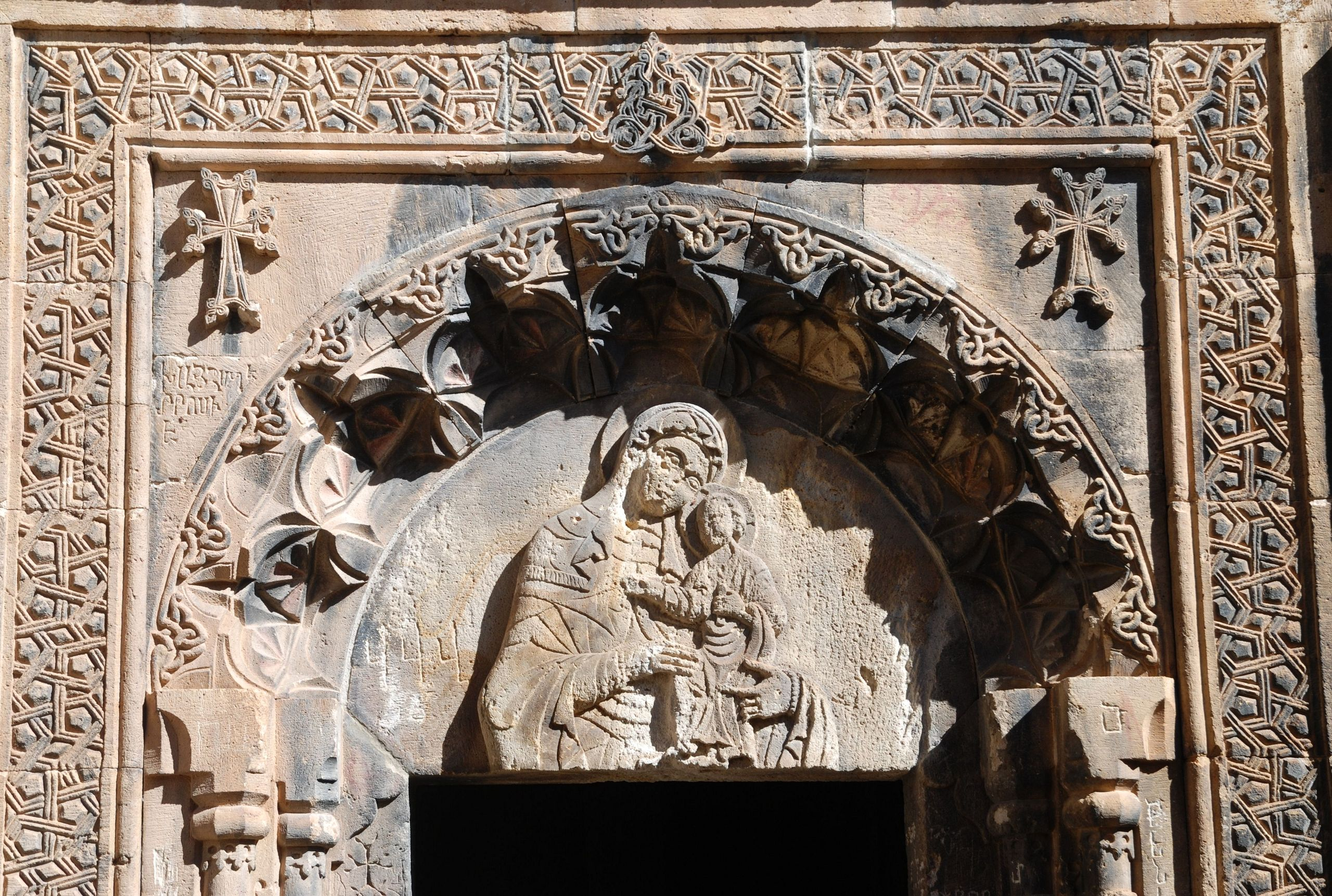
Tympanon of Spitakavor Monastery

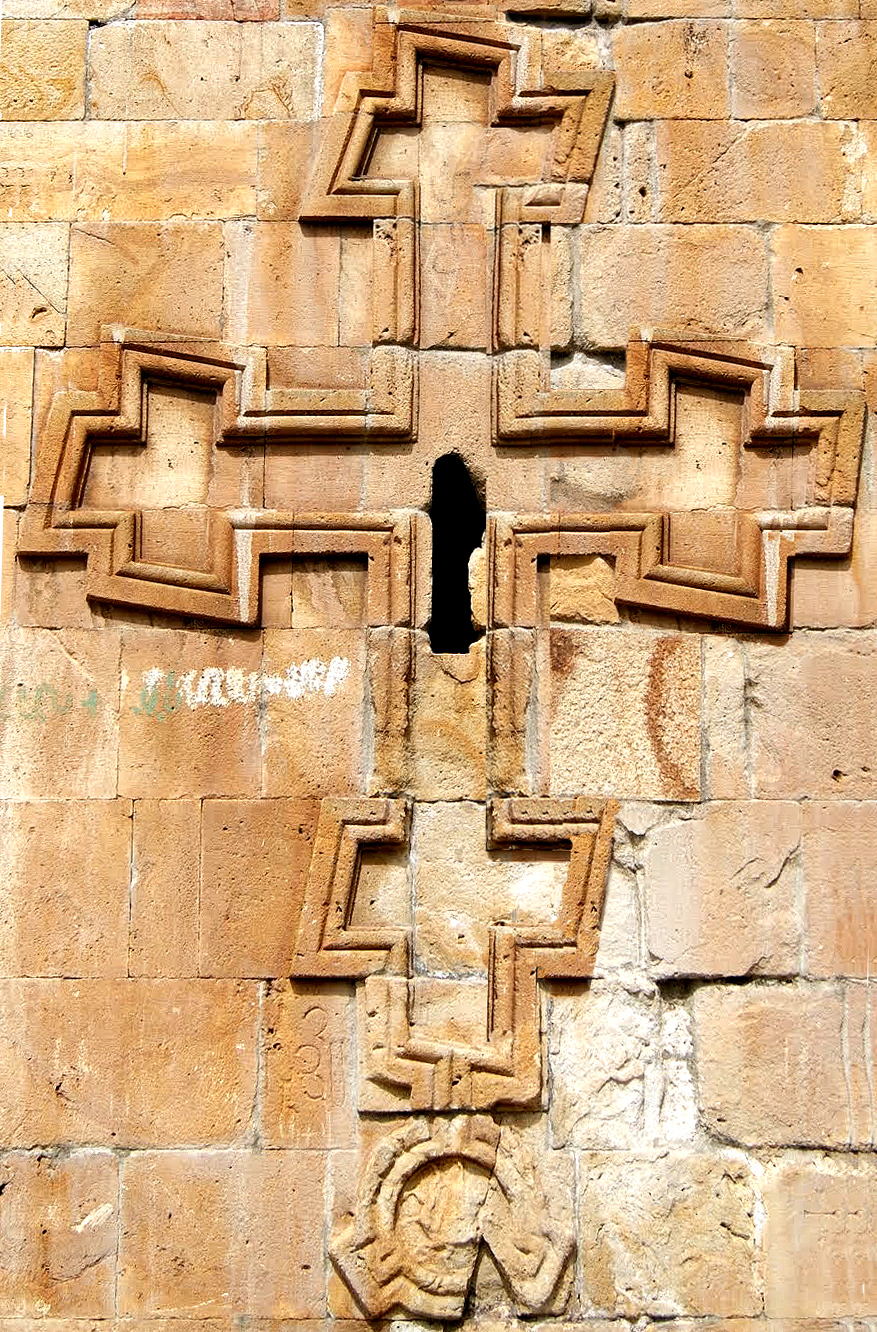
Crooked cross of Spitakavor Monastery
