= Gandzak, Armenia =

Village in Gegharkunik, Armenia

Gandzak Գանձակ
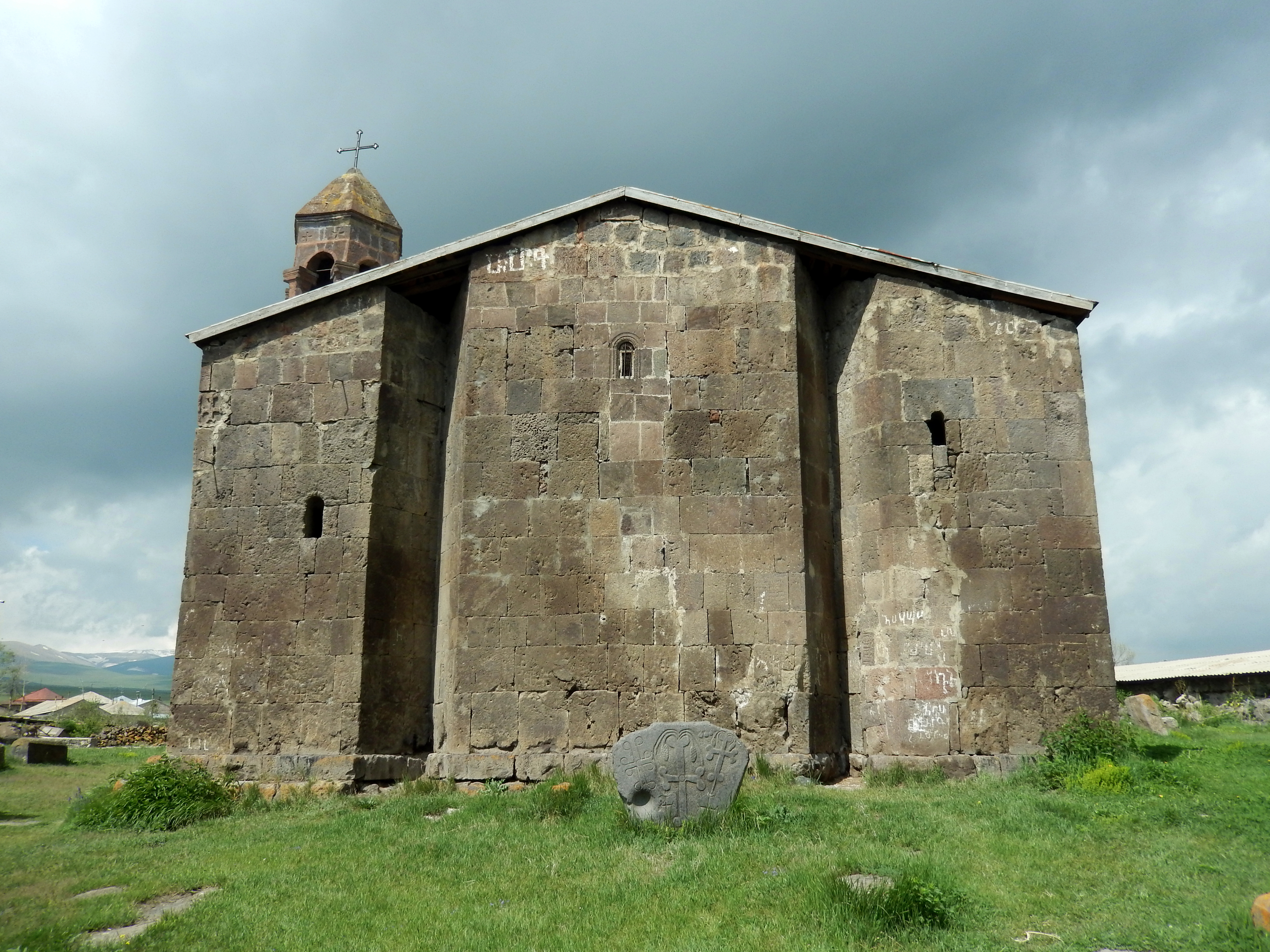
- The 9th-century St. Gevorg Church in Gandzak

- Location within Armenia Location within Gegharkunik
- Coordinates: 40°19′28″N 45°06′54″E
- Country: Armenia
- Province: Gegharkunik
- Municipality: Gavar
- Elevation: 1,978 m (6,490 ft)

Population (2011)
  - Total: 3,815
- Time zone: UTC+4 (AMT)
- Postal code: 1206

Gandzak (Armenian: Գանձակ) is a village in the Gavar Municipality of the Gegharkunik Province of Armenia. The village is located on the eastern side of the Gavar river, 3 km southwest from the regional center Gavar, at an average height of 1,980 meters above sea level.

== Etymology ==
The village was previously known as Kyosamamed and later as Batikian and Batikyan, in honor of Batik Batikian (1892–1920), a Communist activist.

== History ==
The village contains the 4th- or 5th-century half-ruined basilica of St. Astvatsatsin, and the domed 9th- or 10th-century St. Gevorg Church, in ancient times it had a domed hall. In the 19th century, Armenian migrants from Western Armenia covered the destroyed roofs with the logs.

== Notable people ==
- Vardan Areveltsi, thirteenth-century Armenian historian, geographer, philosopher and translator.

== Gallery ==
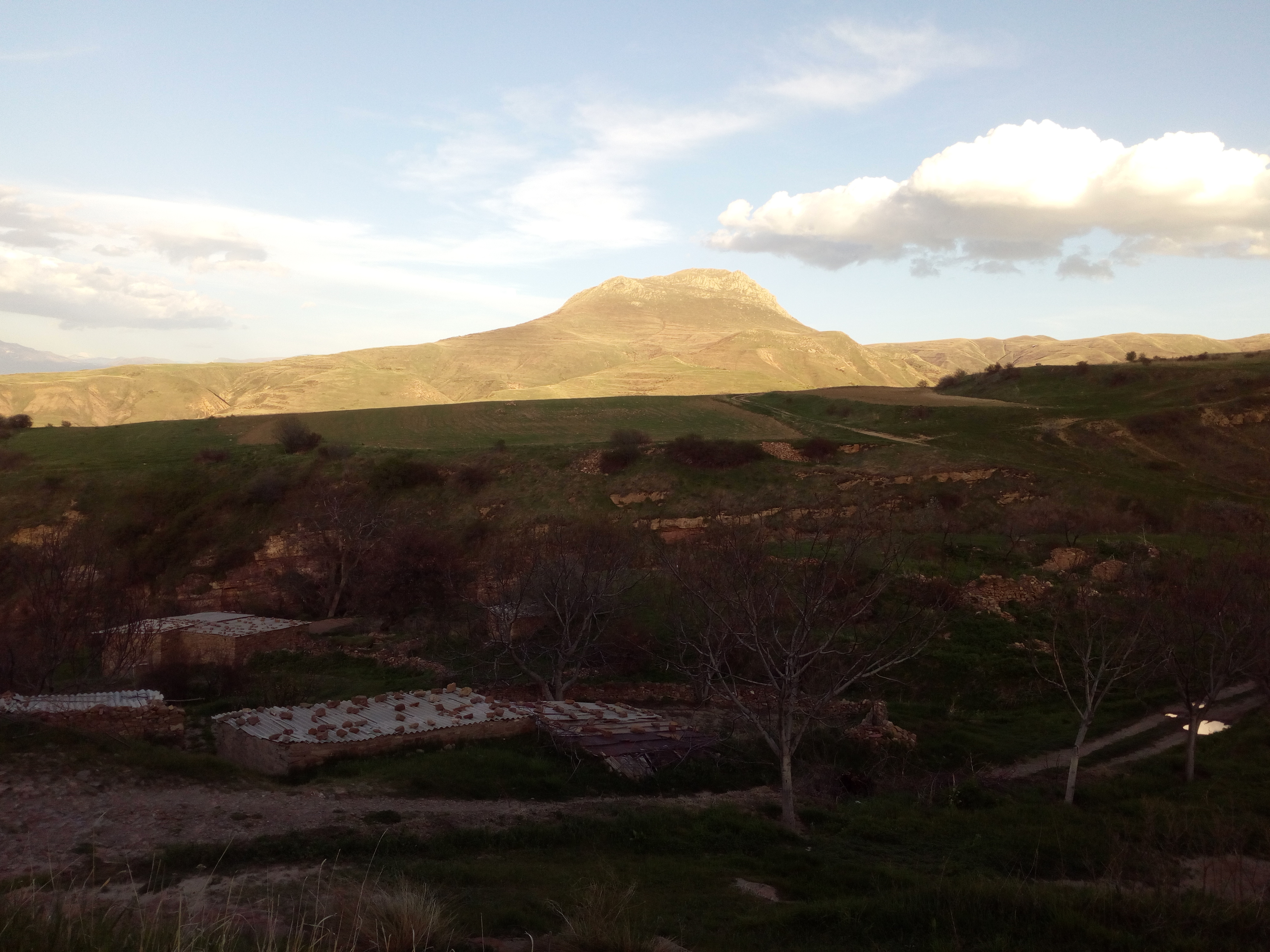
Scenery around Gandzak

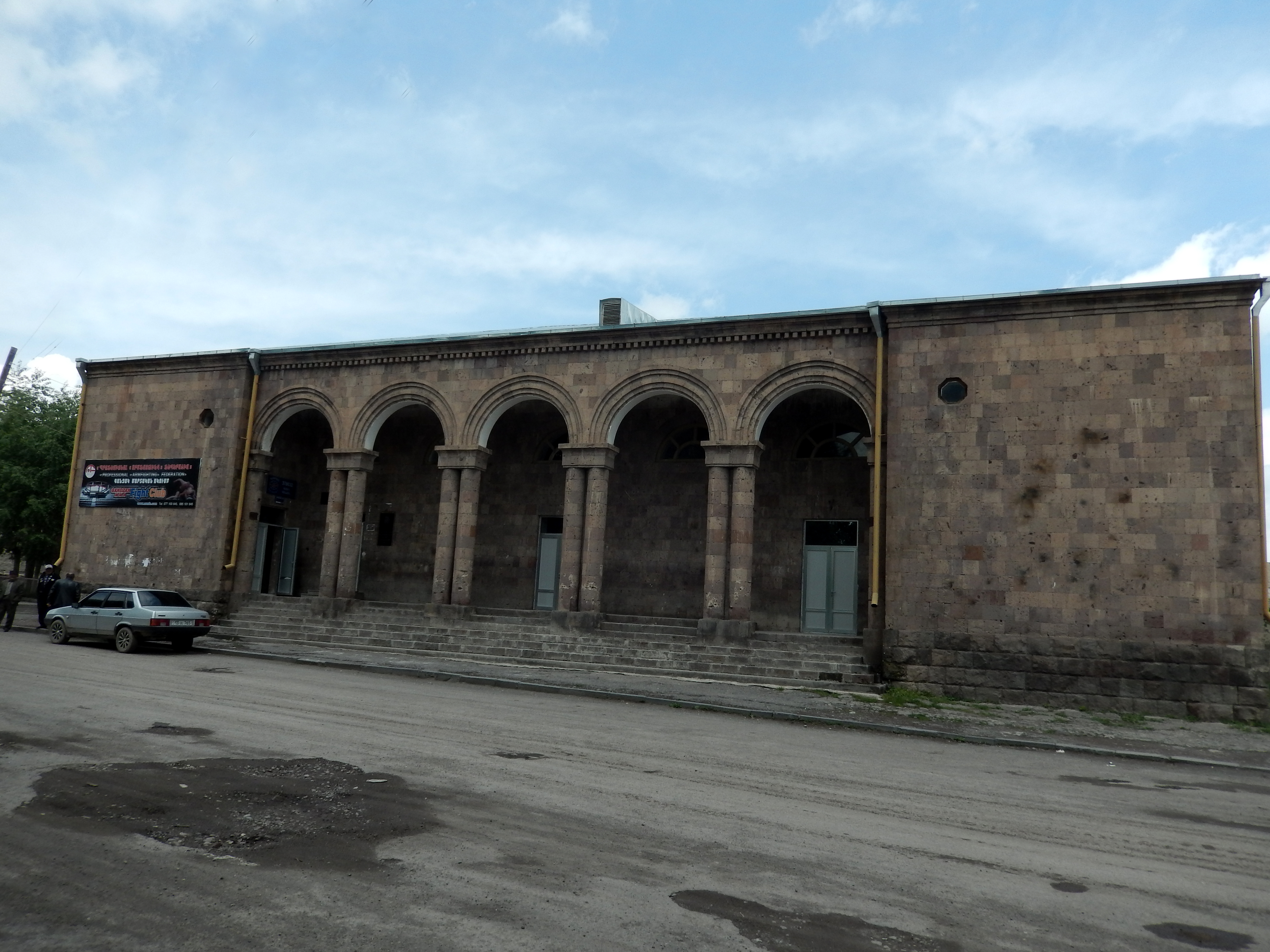
Gandzak house of culture

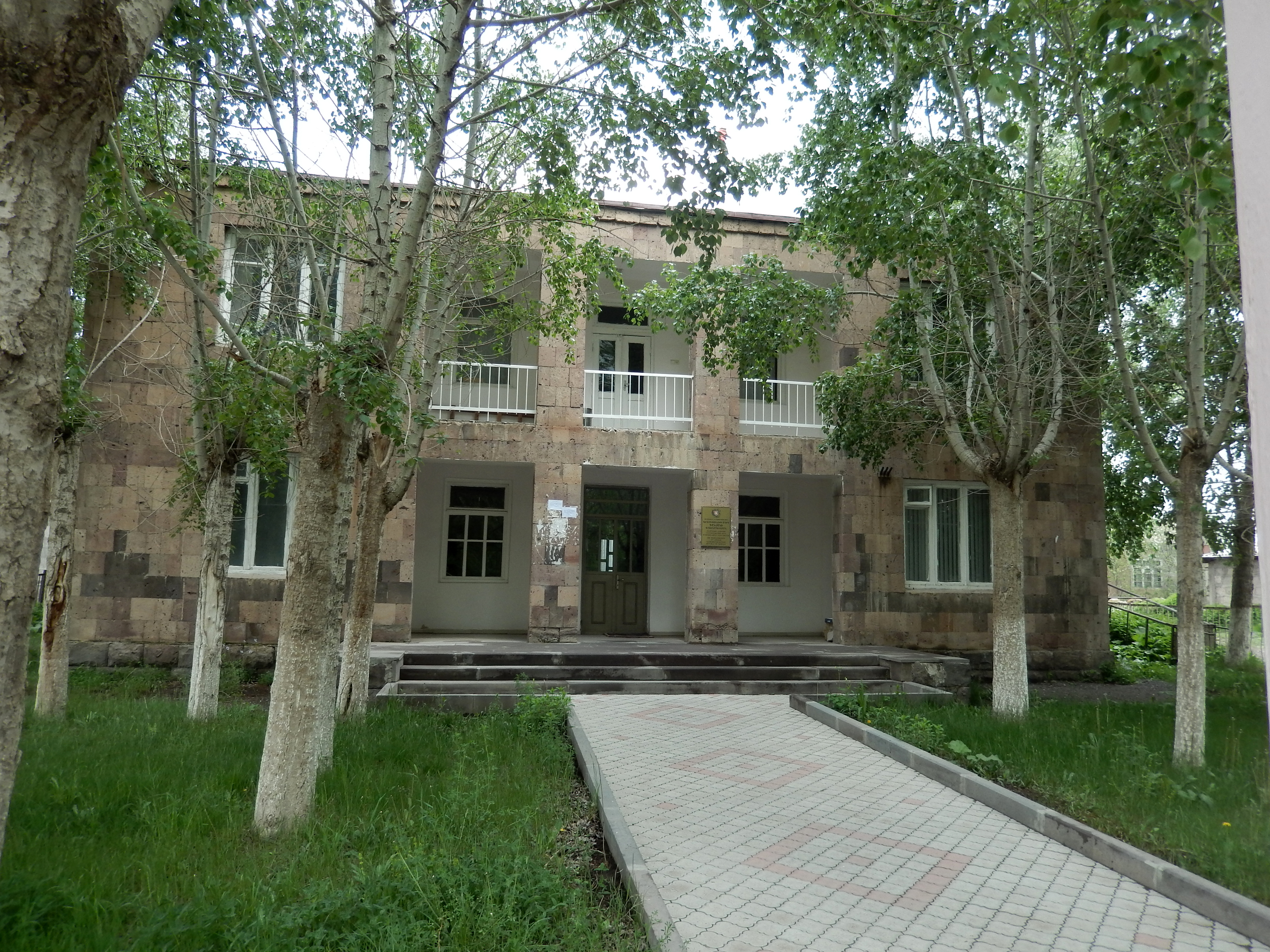
Gandzak municipality building

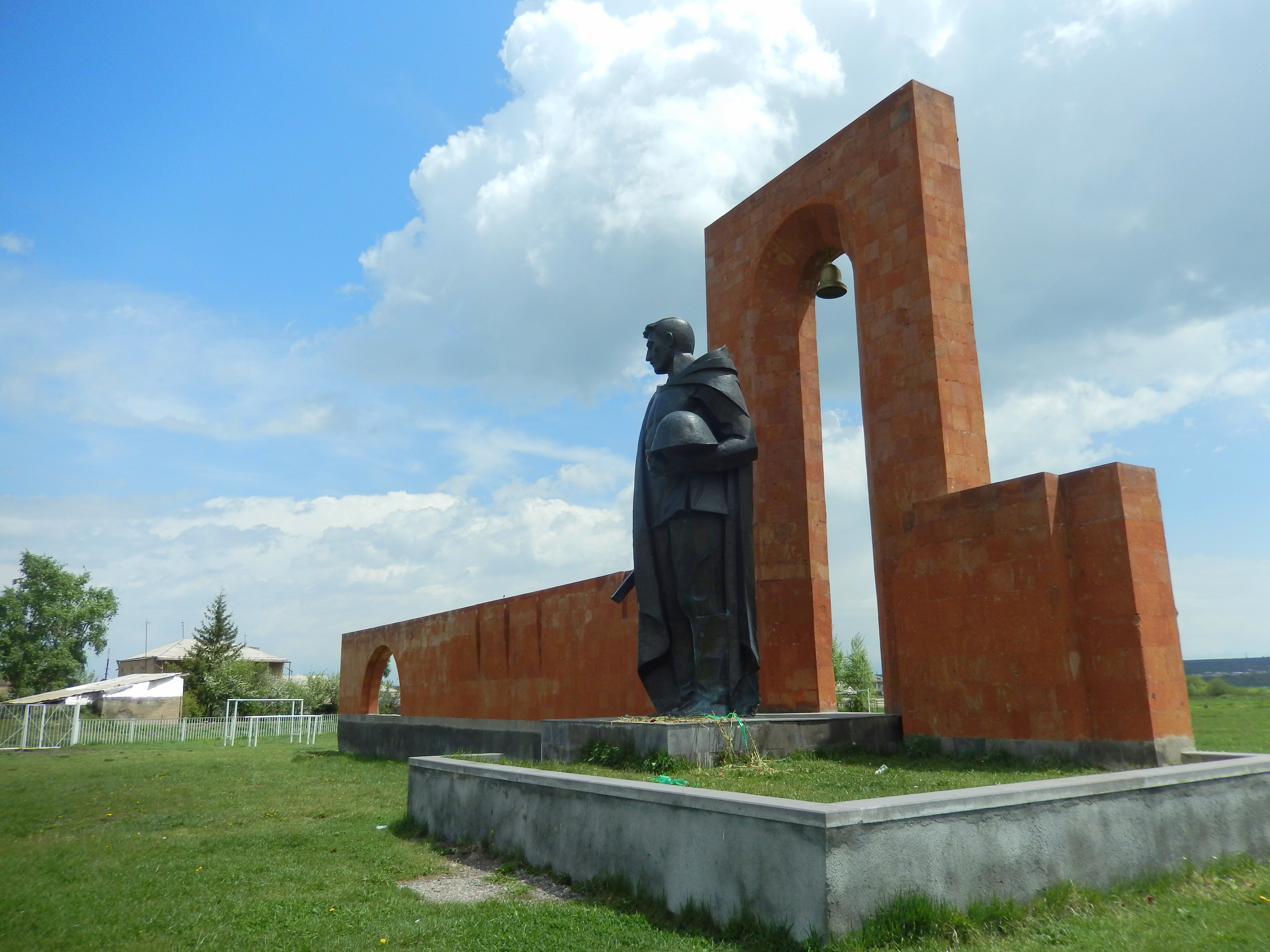
Monument in Gandzak

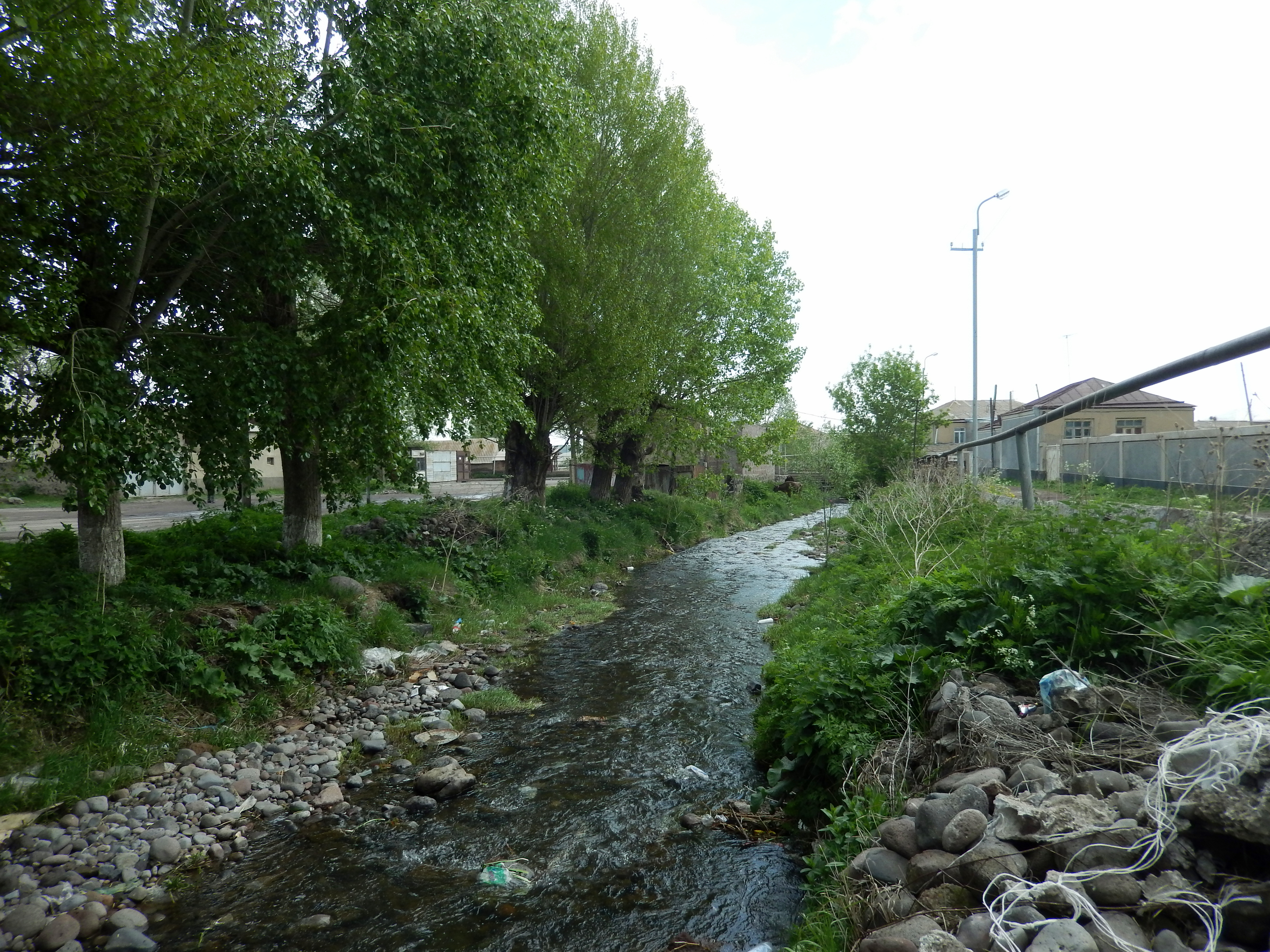
River in Gandzak

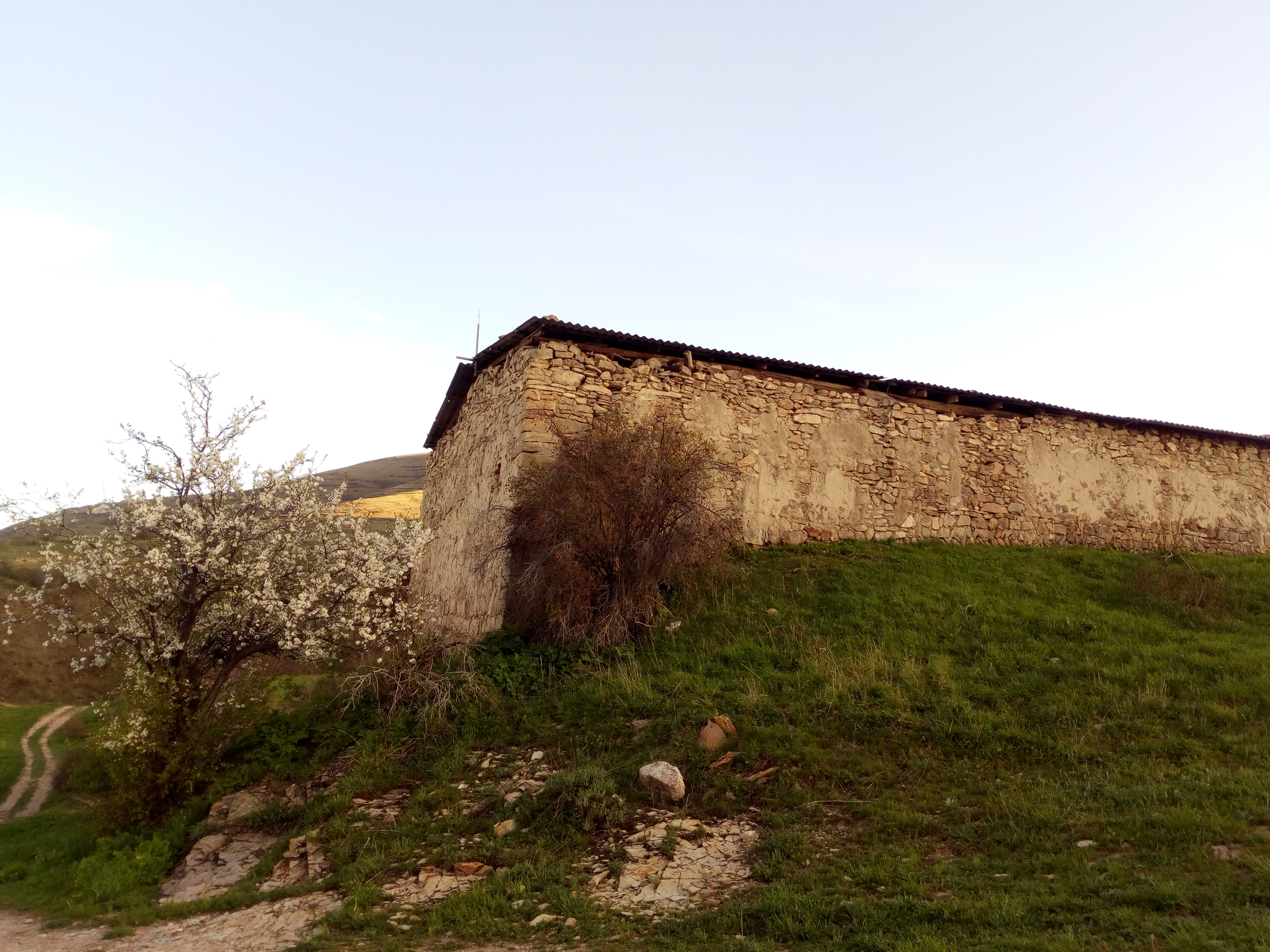
A church in Gandzak
