= Boloraberd, Armenia =

Boloraberd
- Location within Armenia Location within Vayots Dzor
- Coordinates: 39°40′06″N 45°20′40″E
- Country: Armenia
- Marz (Province): Vayots Dzor
- Time zone: UTC+4 ( )
  - Summer (DST): UTC+5 ( )

Boloraberd (also Kurtkulag and Kurdkulag) is a town in the Vayots Dzor Province of Armenia.

== See also ==
- Vayots Dzor Province
