= Zakarid Armenia =

Medieval principality

Coordinates: 40.5075°N 43.5728°E

Zakarid Armenia Զաքարեան Հայաստան
- 1201–1350
- Zakarid territories in the early 13th century
- Capital: Ani
- Common languages: Armenian
- Religion: Armenian Apostolic, Georgian Orthodox Church
- Government: Monarchy
- Zakarids
- Historical era: Middle Ages
  - Established: 1201
  - Conquered by Chobanids: 1350
Preceded by	Succeeded by
Shaddadids	Ilkhanate; Principality of Khachen

Zakarid Armenia (Armenian: Զաքարեան Հայաստան, romanized: Zakaryan Hayastan) alternatively known as the Zakarid Period, describes a historical period in the Middle Ages during which the Armenian vassals of the Kingdom of Georgia were ruled by the Zakarid-Mkhargrzeli dynasty. The city of Ani was the capital of the princedom. The Zakarids were vassals to the Bagrationi dynasty in Georgia, but frequently acted independently and at times titled themselves as kings. In 1236, they fell under the rule of the Mongol Empire as a vassal state with local autonomy.

During the reign of George V and Bagrat V, the Zakarid territories once again reverted to the Kingdom of Georgia. The Zakarid dynasty continued to rule Ani until around 1350, when it was conquered and ravaged by the Chobanids.

== Inception ==
Armenian historians of the 13th century Kirakos Gandzaketsi and Vardan the Great reported that Ivane's great-grandfather "broke away from the Kurdish tribe of Babir", and established himself in northern Armenia. He then became a vassal and a possible relative of the Kjurikid dynasty of Armenian kings in the Tashir-Dzoraget region. He received a fortress and became a Christian of the Armenian Miaphysite Church.

Following the collapse of the Bagratuni dynasty of Armenia in 1045, Armenia was successively occupied by Byzantines and, following the Battle of Manzikert in 1071, by the Seljuks. Khosrov Zakarian, the first historically traceable member of the Zakarid family, moved from Armenia to southern Georgia during the Seljuk invasions in the early 11th century. Over the next hundred years, the Zakarids gradually gained prominence at the Georgian court, where they became known as Mkhargrdzeli (Long-shoulder) or in Armenian: Երկայնաբազուկ, (Yerkaynabazuk). A family legend says that this name was a reference to their Achaemenid ancestor Artaxerxes II the "Longarmed" (404–358 BC).

During the 12th century, the Bagratids of Georgia enjoyed a resurgence in power, and managed to expand into Seljuk-occupied Armenia. The former Armenian capital Ani would be captured five times between 1124 and 1209. Under King George III of Georgia, Sargis Zakarian was appointed as governor of Ani in 1161. In 1177, the Zakarids supported the monarchy against the insurgents during the rebellion of Prince Demna and the Orbeli family. The uprising was suppressed, and George III persecuted his opponents and elevated the Zakarids.

=== Zakare and Ivane ===
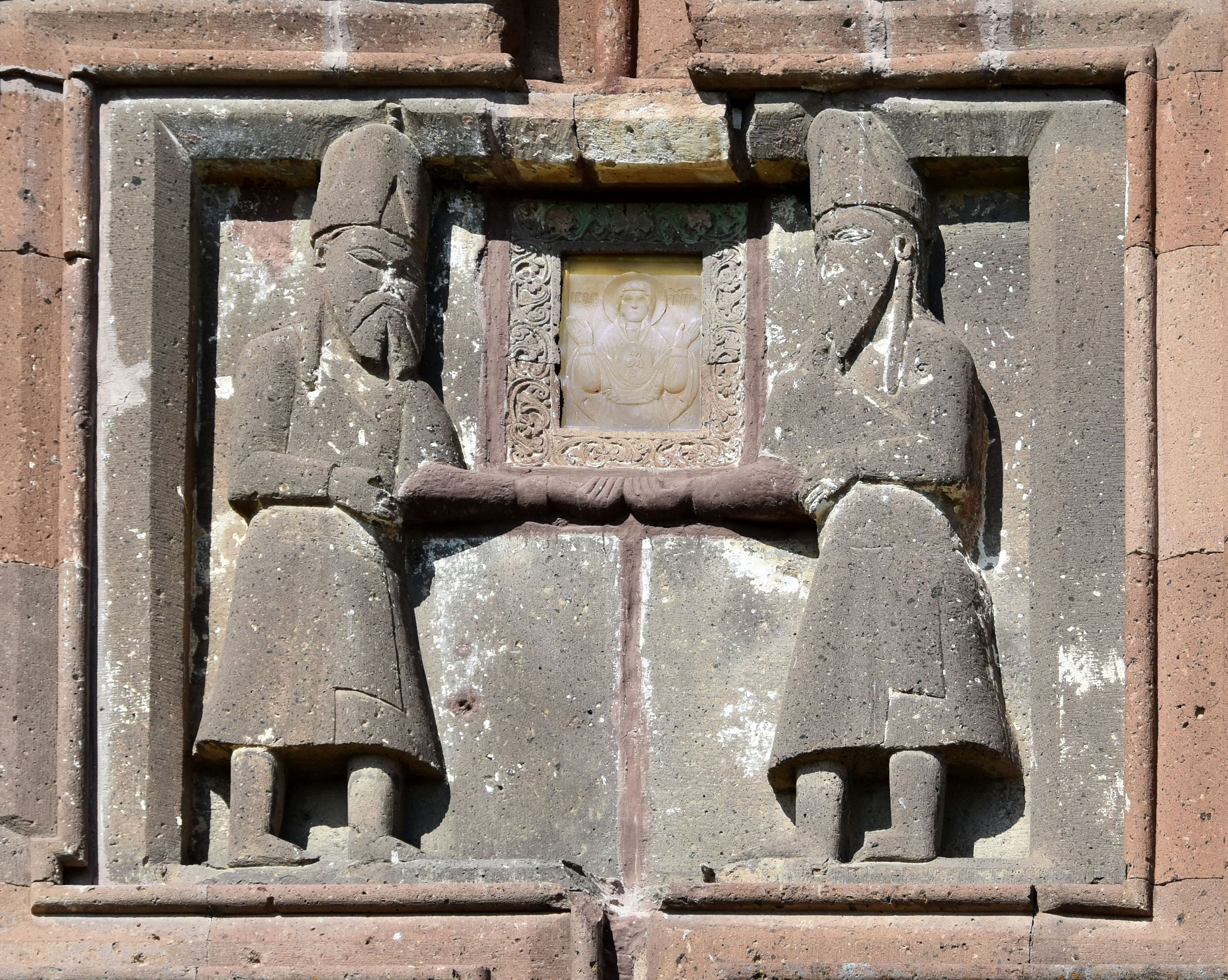
Zakare II and Ivane I on the east facade at Harichavank, Armenia, 1201. They wear the contemporary costume, with tall sharbush hat and kaftans.

Despite some complications in the reign of George III, the successes continued in the reign of the Queen Tamar. This was chiefly due to the Armenian generals Zakare and Ivane. Around the year 1199, they retook the city of Ani. Zakare and Ivane commanded the Georgian-Armenian armies for almost three decades, achieving major victories at Shamkor in 1195 and Basian in 1203 and leading raids into northern Persia in 1210.

The two brothers, together with the Alanian David Soslan managed to put Georgia back on a winning track. Because of their successes, Zakare and Ivane reached the heights of the Georgian army and court. Queen Tamar gave them the status of nakharar feudal lords, who took the name "Zak'arians", in honor of Zak'are. She gave them control of almost all her Armenian territories, with Ani as capital. In an inscription in Zakare's church in Ani, the brothers are called "Kings of Armenia".

Still, Ivane and Zakare encountered animosity in some quarters because of their religious affiliation to Armenian Miaphysitism, rather than the Chalcedonian faith of the Georgians. The younger brother Ivane eventually converted, allowing the two brothers to adroitely bridge the religious spectrum in Georgia, Ivane commanding Georgian troops while Zakare commanded Armenian ones. Conflicts regarding devotional practices still erupted between the two armies, hampering coordinated operations, as in a military campaign 1204. A synod had to be convened at the highest level, and the Armenians agreed to harmonize some practices.

== Consolidation of Armenian rule (1201–1239) ==
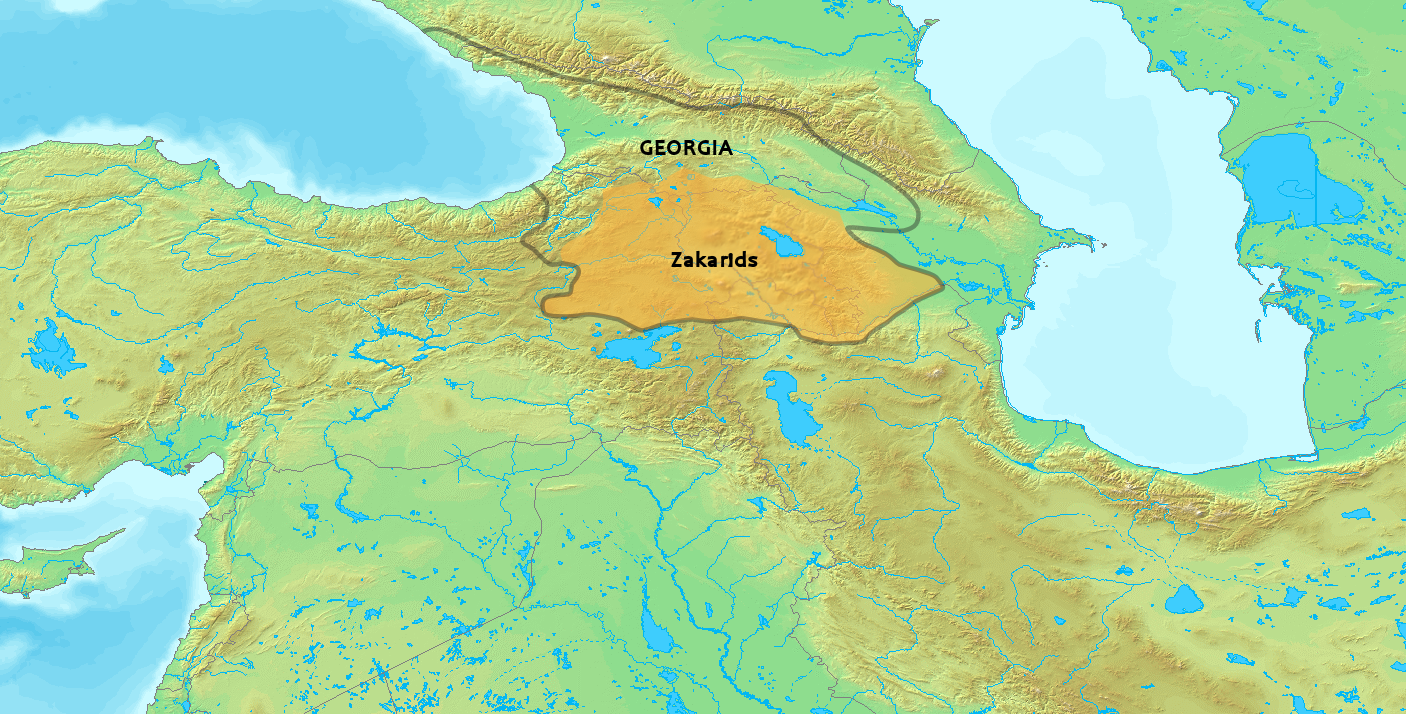
Approximate Zakarid territory within the Kingdom of Georgia , circa 1210

Around the year 1199, a Georgian army under Zakare's command took the city of Ani from Shadaddid control, and in 1201, Tamar gave it to him as a fief. Thereafter, Zakarids maintained high degree of autonomy and often acted independently. The volume of trade seems to have increased in the early 13th century, and under the Zakarid princes the city prospered, at least until the area was occupied by the Mongols in 1237. The Zakarians amassed a great fortune, governing all of northern Armenia. Zakare and his descendants ruled in northwestern Armenia with Ani as their capital, while Ivane and his offspring ruled eastern Armenia, including the city of Dvin. Eventually, their territories came to resemble those of Bagratid Armenia. They maintained a high level of local autonomy, acting as an Armenian state with the right to court and collect taxes, while under nominal Georgian suzerainty. While they were vassals of the Georgian king, the Zakarids often acted independently and established their own political and tax systems. Their allegiance to the Georgian kings was mostly confined to providing the kings with military assistance during times of war. In their capital city of Ani, they named themselves the “Kings of Ani” exemplifying their independent ambitions from the Kings of Georgia. The Zakarid had their own vassals, including the Orbelians and Vachutians, and also had the ability to establish their own nakharar feudal vassals, often selected from the ranks of their best general, as in the case of the Proshian clan. They adopted "the trappings of both Christian and Muslim royal power", as shown in their adoption of the title "Shahanshah" (king of kings) for their names and titles. In the dedicatory inscription of Tigran Honents, the Zakarians are referred to as the only "overlords", and the "powerful masters of the universe".

=== Religion ===
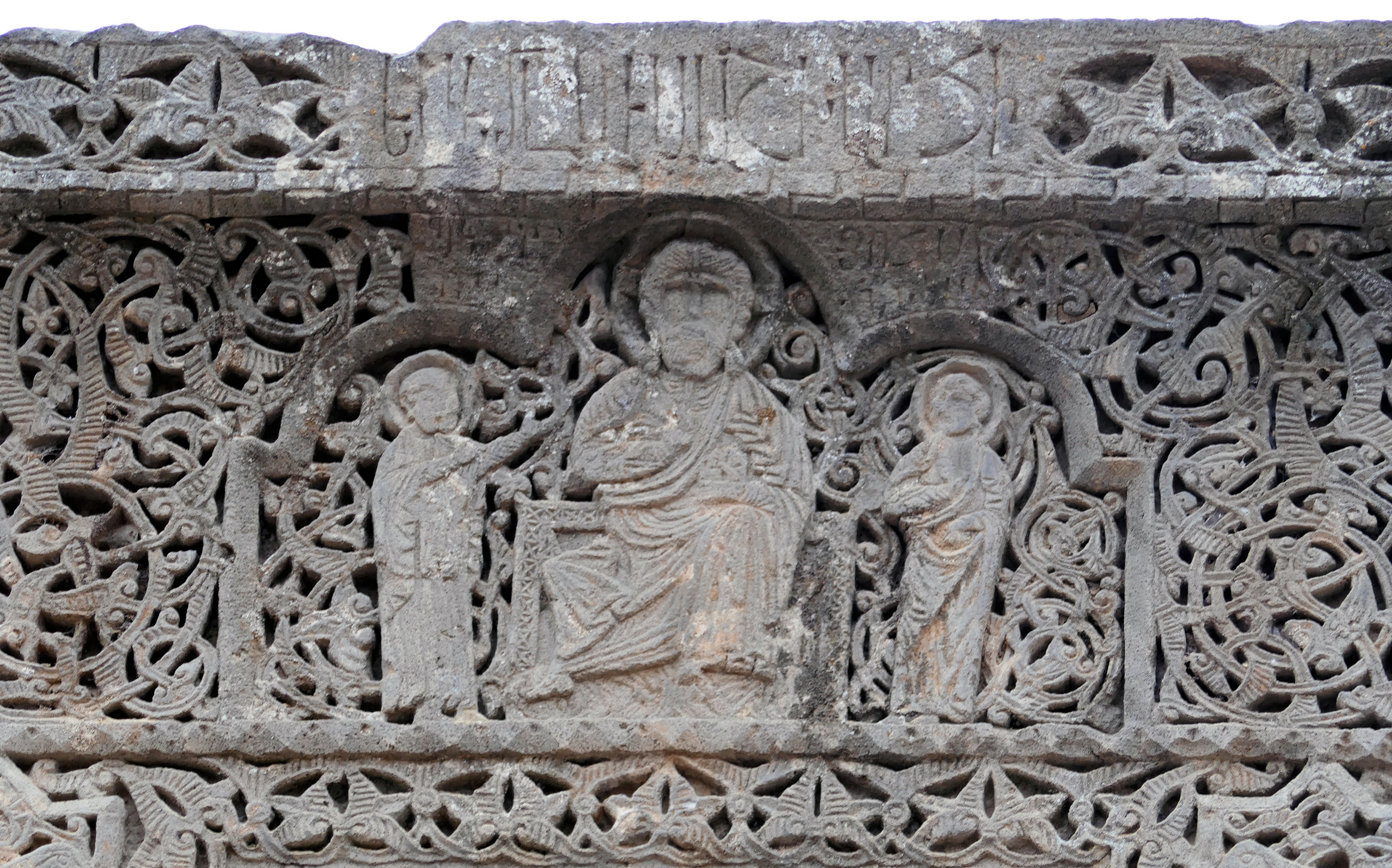
Deesis on the Khachqar of the Zakarid Prince Grigor Khaghbakian, dated 1233.

The reconquered regions of historical Armenia had mixed confessional identities, with Armenians being mainly Miaphysites, and Georgians and Greeks mainly Chalcedonian Christians, and relations were often conflictual. But the boundaries were moveable: Ivane I Zakarian had converted to Chalcedonism in the early 13th century, and a significant number of Armenians had followed him, voluntarily or not.

The Zakarids seem to have promoted a level of ambiguity between the two faiths, and voluntarily mixed elements from both, minimizing differences, possibly as a political expedient helping them better rule their realm. In the church St Gregory of Tigran Honents, dedicated in 1215 in Ani, the combination of scenes with the myths of the evangelists of Armenia and Georgia might suggest a conflation of Armenian Miaphysite and Georgian Chalcedonian rites. The Zakarids are also known for their efforts at church councils to bring together the Miaphysite and Chalcedonian faiths, especially in respect to their outward expression, such as rites and the usage of icones.

=== Building activity ===
The Zakarids, under Georgian overlordship since 1199–1200, were active builders of religious monuments, such as the church of St Gregory of Tigran Honents, built in 1215 in Ani, or the Church of Kizkale. The donators of St Gregory of Tigran Honents were identified as Armenian Miaphysites in their inscriptions, but on the other hand the artistic program rather reflected the Chalcedonian faith, suggesting that the church may have belonged to a Chalcedonian community of Armenians, who had chosen to adopt Georgian styles and practices. Alternatively, this church may have served a larger community of both Armenians and Georgians, or may have served as an example of the unification of Miaphysite and Chalcedonian faiths, at least in their outward expression, as often desired by Zakarid rulers.

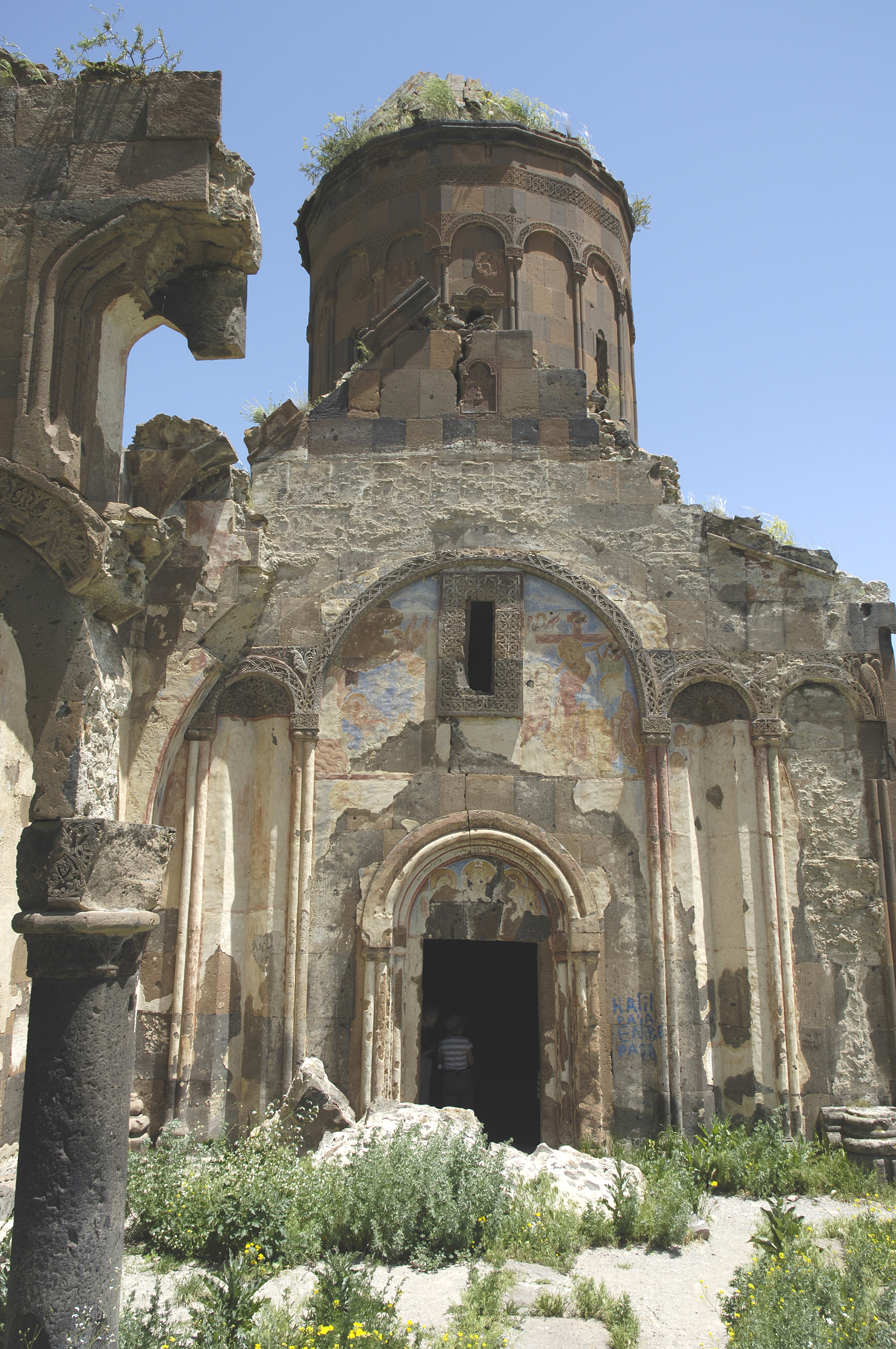
Zakarid church of St Gregory of Tigran Honents, Ani, 1215.

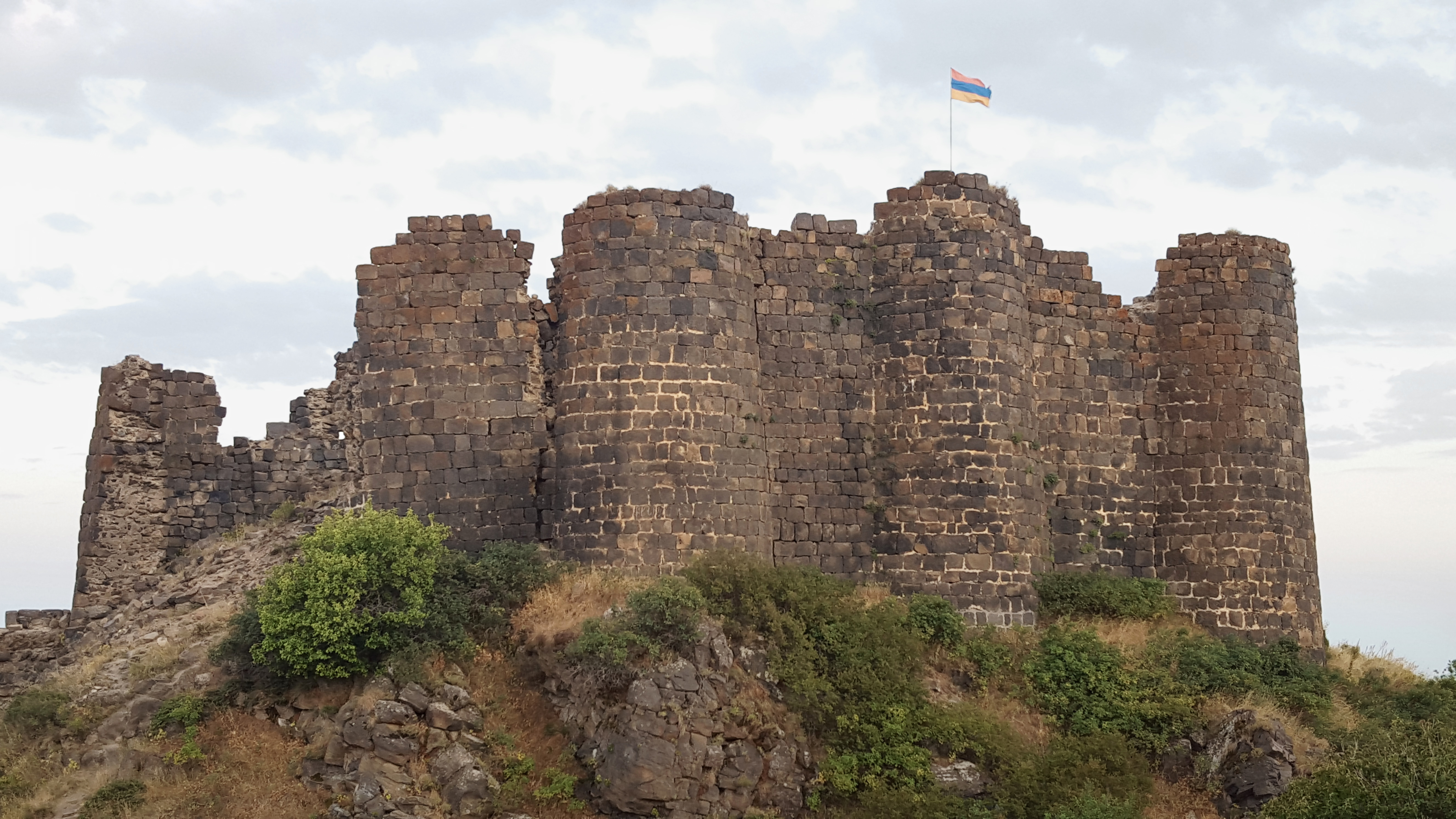
Amberd castle was conquered from the Seljuq Turks in 1197 by Zakare Zakarian, and reinforced under the Zakarians thereafter.

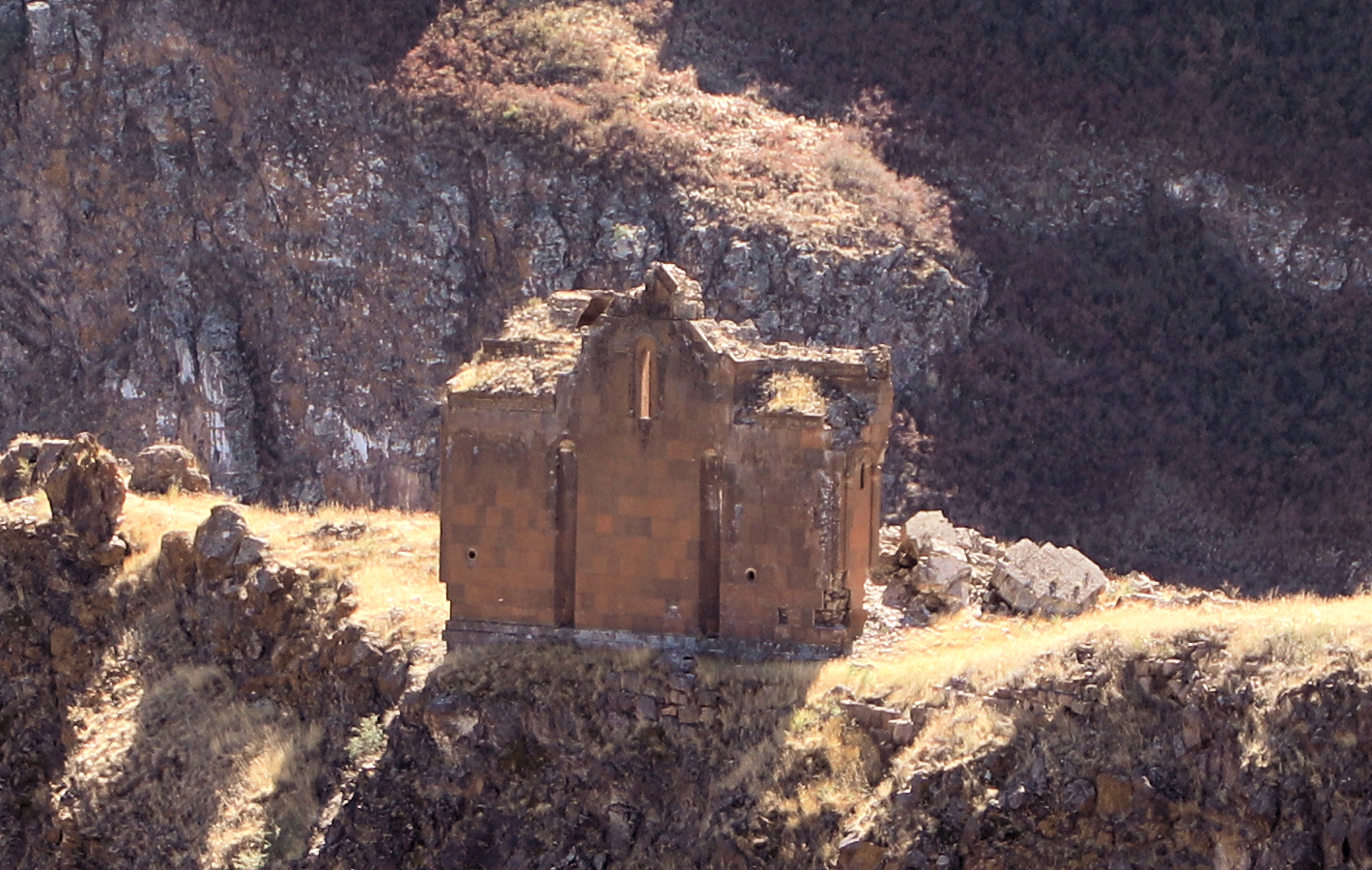
Zakare's church built in Ani by Zakare II Zakarian circa 1200

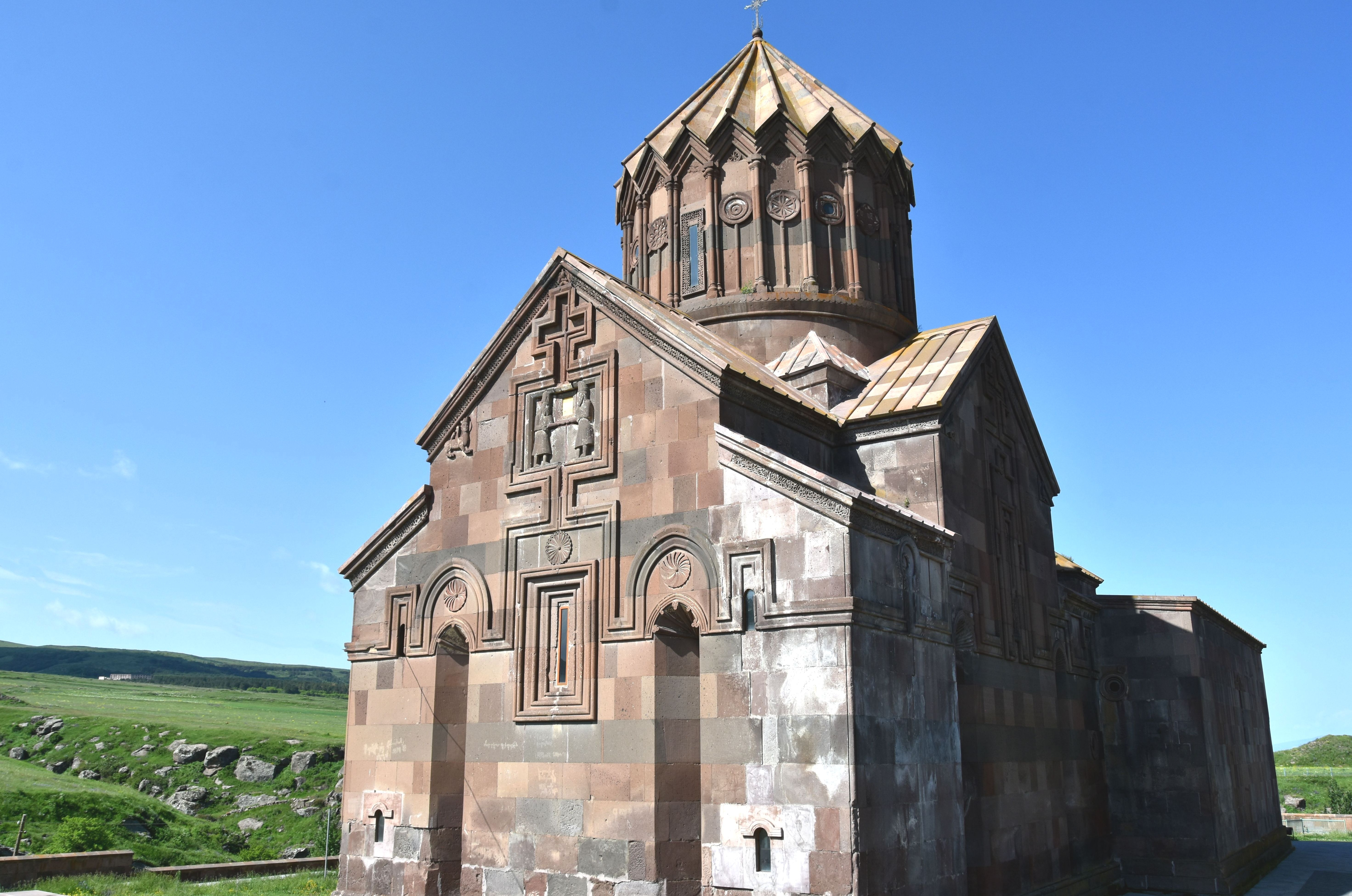
The cathedral of Harichavank was built by Zakare II Zakarian

=== Monumental religious paintings ===
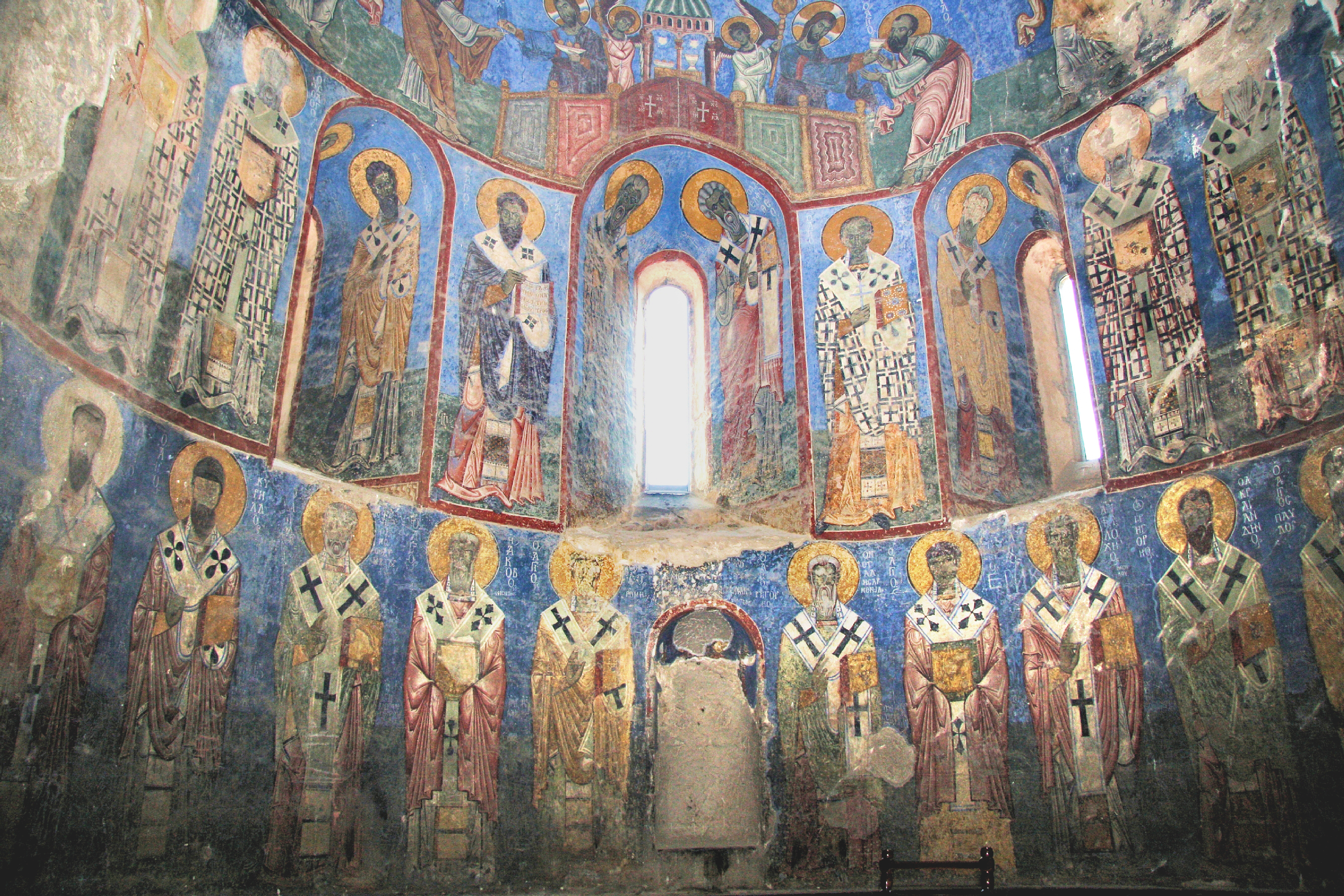
The frescoes of Akhtala Monastery, in Armenian-Chalcedonian style, were commissioned by Ivane Zakarian in 1205-1216.

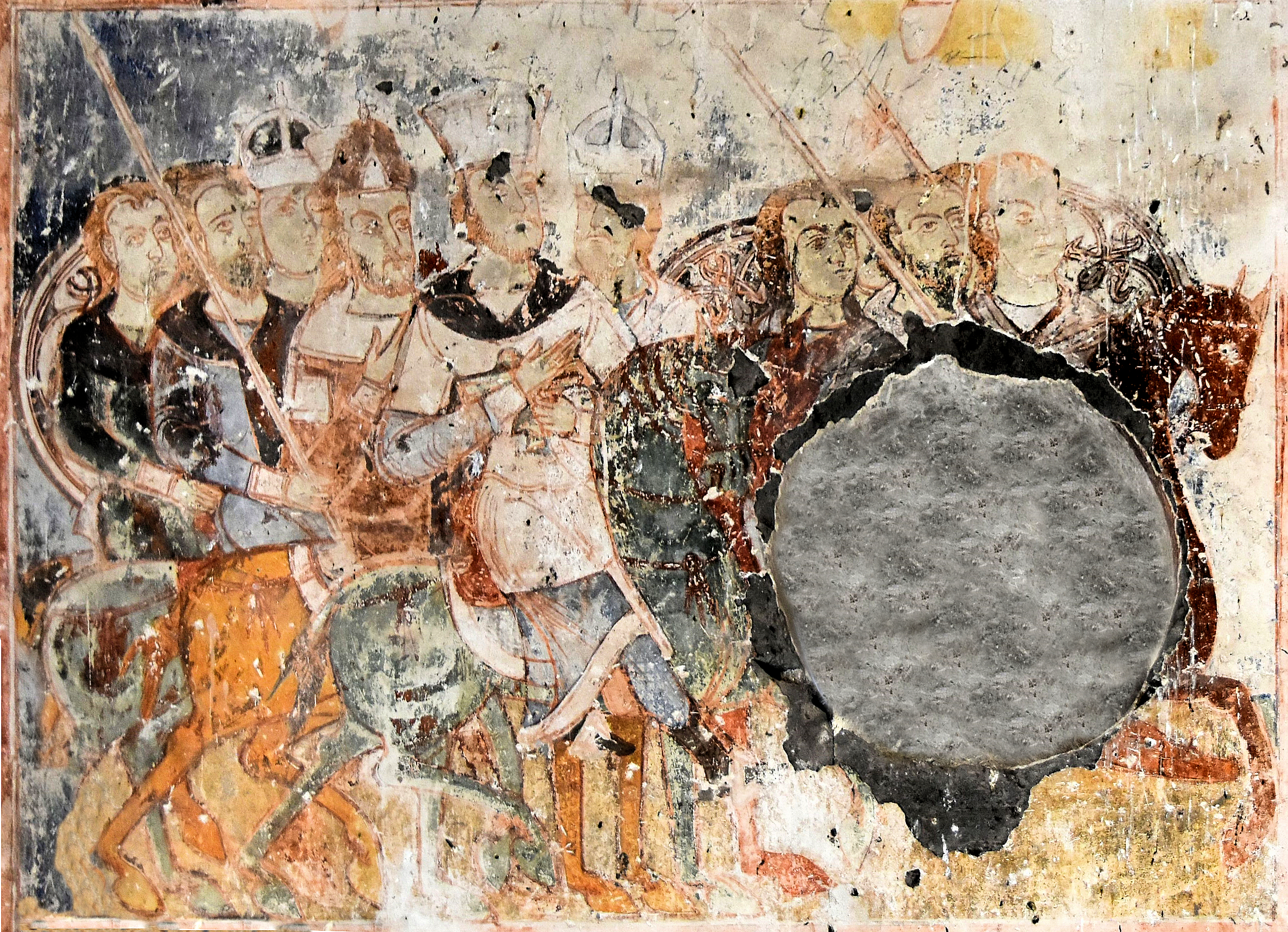
Christening of Armenian king Tiridates III (c.250–330). Zakarid church of St Gregory of Tigran Honents, Ani, 1215.

Armenia relatively lacked a tradition of monumental painting before the 13th century. Wall paintings were not banned in Armenia, but were rare, and sources show suspicion towards a practice that was considered "Georgian" or "Byzantine", and bordering on the heretical.

The development of monumental religious painting in Armenia in the 13th century was probably related to the efforts made by the Zakarids in bridging differences between "Armenian" Miaphysitism and "Georgian" Chalcedonism, possibly as a political expedient helping them better rule their realm. Zakare II Zakarian convened a synod at the highest level, with Levon (r.1187-1219) King of Cilician Armenia and his Catholicos, so that Miaphysites would converge with Chalcedonians in the rites and expression of their faith. In particular, the synod acknowledged that "icons of the Savior and all the saints should be accepted, and not despised as though they were pagan images", opening the way for the creation of monumental religious paintings such as those seen at Ani.

The Zakarids then sponsored a large program of monumental pictorial art, blending Byzantine, Armenian and Georgian traditions. The beautiful murals of Akhtala Monastery, commissioned by Ivane I Zakarian in 1205–1216, are an example of Armenian-Chalcedonian art, blending Byzantine, Armenian and Georgian styles, and inscribed in Georgian, Greek and Armenian.

Few paintings are found in the remains of the Zakarid capital of Ani, and the earliest known ones are those of St Gregory of Tigran Honents, dating to c. 1215. These paintings, exclusively labelled in Georgian and Greek, may have belonged to a Georgian artistic tradition, as suggested by style, technique (intense blue backgrounds), and iconographical details. The paintings are focused on the main feasts of the Chalcedonian Church. Still, various characteristics and iconographical details are decidedly Armenian and relate to Miaphysitism. There is a possibility that Georgian artists were hired in order to accomplish such pictorial programs, although Byzantines and Armenians are also known to have been involved. The signatures of the artists found beneath the paintings of some of the main figures at Akhtala Monastery have been found to be in Armenian and Greek.

=== Mongol and Kipchak invasions ===
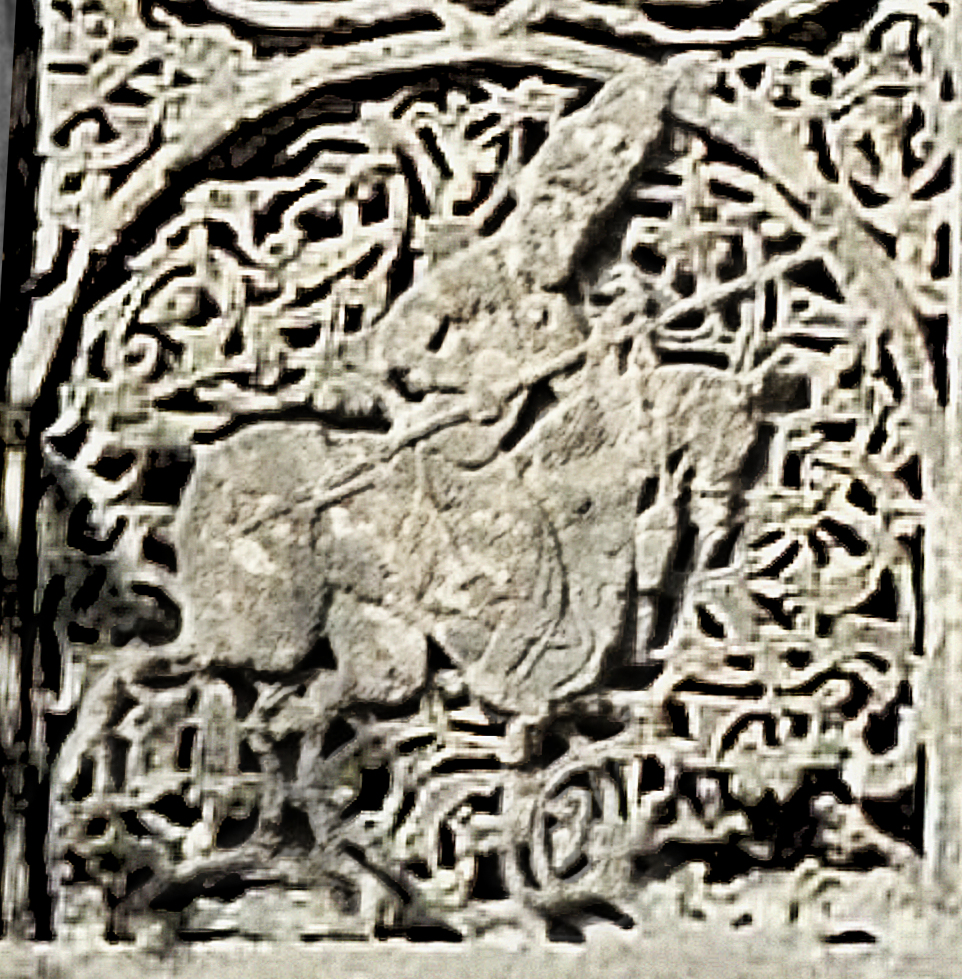
Zakarid Prince Grigor Khaghbakian on horse, in his khatchkar (1233).

In 1220, according to the 13th century Armenian historian Kirakos Gandzaketsi, started the first Mongol incursions under Subutai, part of the Mongol invasions of Georgia. This first wave was only composed of 3 tümen (30,000 men), and was actually on a search for the fugitive Khwarizmian ruler Muhammad II of Khwarazm. The Zakarids served under the Georgian king George IV of Georgia to repulse them, with Ivane I Zakarian acting as atabeg (Governor General) and Amirspasalar (Commander-in-chief), their army only half the size of the Mongol one. The Georgians and Armenians were defeated, but the Mongol retreated with heavy losses. The Mongols came back the following year, but were blocked on the road to Tbilissi by an army of 70,000. The Mongols again won, but retreated to Tabriz. A third encounter the same year virtually annihilated the Georgian army, and the Mongols continued north to confront the Kipchaks at far as Soldaia, and the Rus' Principalities at the Battle of the Kalka River. Before dying, George IV made an alliance with the Sultanate of Rum, by marrying his sister Rusudan to Ghias ad-Din, son of the emir of Erzurum.

In 1222, the Kipchaks, fleeing from Mongol devastation, came to the Armenian city of Gandzak, where they encountered the troops of the atabeg Ivane Zakarian, who were again defeated. Although the Georgians ultimately prevailed in 1223, the Zakarian Prince Grigor Khaghbakian was captured and tortured to death by the Kipchak Turks.

When the Khwarazmians under Jalal al-Din Mangburni invaded the region in 1226–1230, Dvin was ruled by the aging Ivane, who had given Ani to his nephew Shahnshah, son of Zakare. Dvin was lost, but Kars and Ani did not surrender.

The Mongols led a major offensive in 1238–39, and took Ani in 1239. They obtained the submission of the Zakarids and left them in place in their regions. They confirmed Shanshe in his fief, and even added to it the fief of Avag, son of Ivane. Further, in 1243, they gave Akhlat to the princess Tamta, daughter of Ivane.

== Mongol suzerainty (1239–1357) ==
The Mongols under General Chormaqan conquered the whole of historical Armenia and Georgia in 1238–39, leading to the submission of the Kingdom of Georgia in the 1239 treaty. Three Mongols campaigns took place altogether from 1239 to 1244: capture of Ani and Kars in 1239, Karin in 1242, and defeat of the Seljuk Sultan in 1243–44 with the major Battle of Köse Dağ. After the Mongols captured Ani, the Zakarids ruled not as vassals of the Bagratids, but rather as vassals of the Mongols, under the governorships of Arghun Aqa. Still, while under Mongol control, the Zakarids maintained nominal suzerainty to the Georgian, who were themselves tributaries of the Mongols.

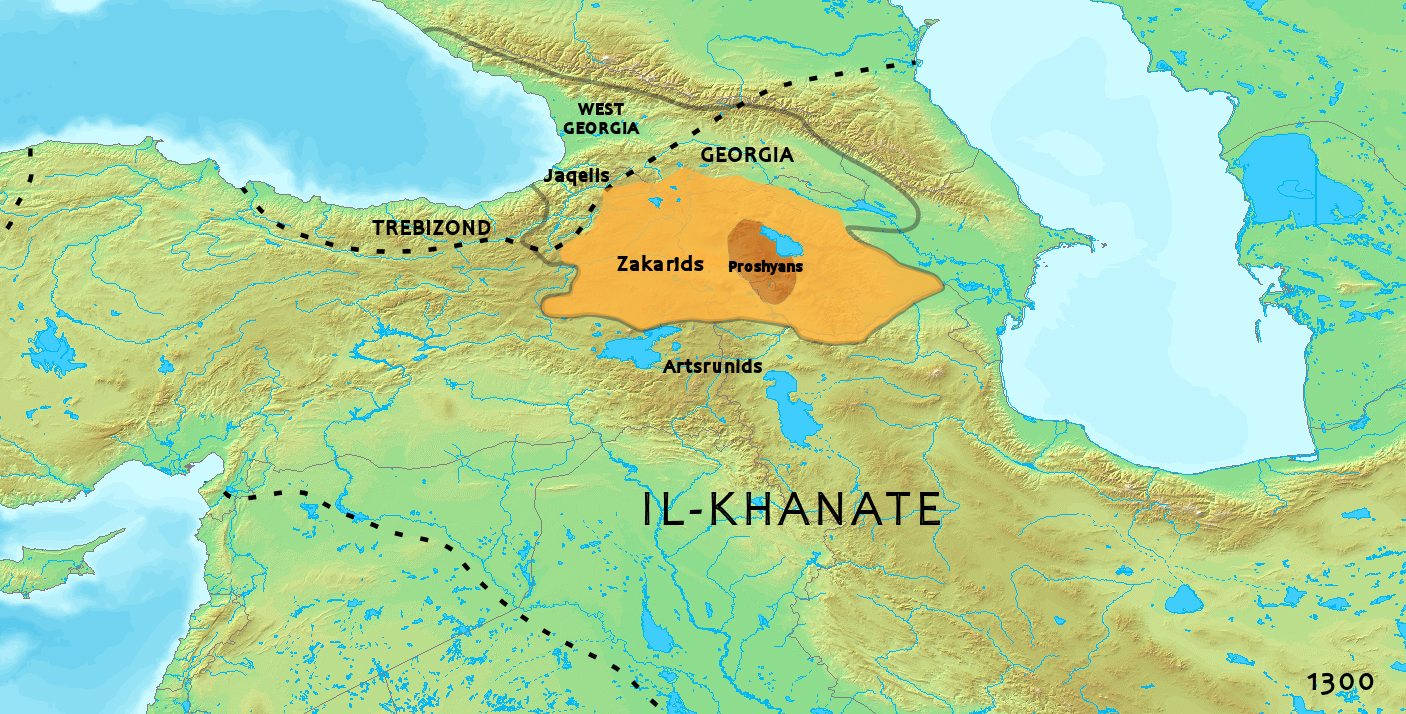
The Zakarids were effectively part of the Mongol Il-Khanate, after 1256. Their new vassals the Proshyans also had arisen.

Between 1236 and 1256, before the creation of the Il-Khanate, Caucasia was placed under the military governorship of Chormaqan, and divided into 5 vilayets (provinces): Georgia (Gurjistan), Greater Armenia, Shirvan, Arran, and Mughan, with Armenian principalities becoming fragmented and essentially independent. After 1256, Armenia was directly incorporated into the Il-Khanate founded by Hulegu, and again under the Jalayirid and Chobanids Mongol successors, until Tamerlane brought a whole new era of devastation.

The Proshyan dynasty was a family of the Armenian nobility, under Zakarid Armenia during the 13th–14th century CE. They too prospered as allies of the Mongols, as did the Zakarids and Orbelians. They benefited from trade routes to China under the control of the Mongols, and built many magnificent churches and monasteries. The later kings of Zakarids continued their control over Ani until the 1360, when they lost to the Kara Koyunlu Turkoman tribes, who made Ani their capital.

Mongol rule was considered as particularly harsh, as described by a 1292 Armenian colophon:

This book was written in the Armenian calendar year 741 (1292), under the rule of the oppressor, of strange appearance and ruthless, which is called Tatar, of the impious race of Cathay, who invaded the whole world because of our sins. And they are so ruthless and cruel that brother kills brother and father kills son, but God's punishment will come.

— Colophon of Xalbakeank.

=== Taxes and revolts ===
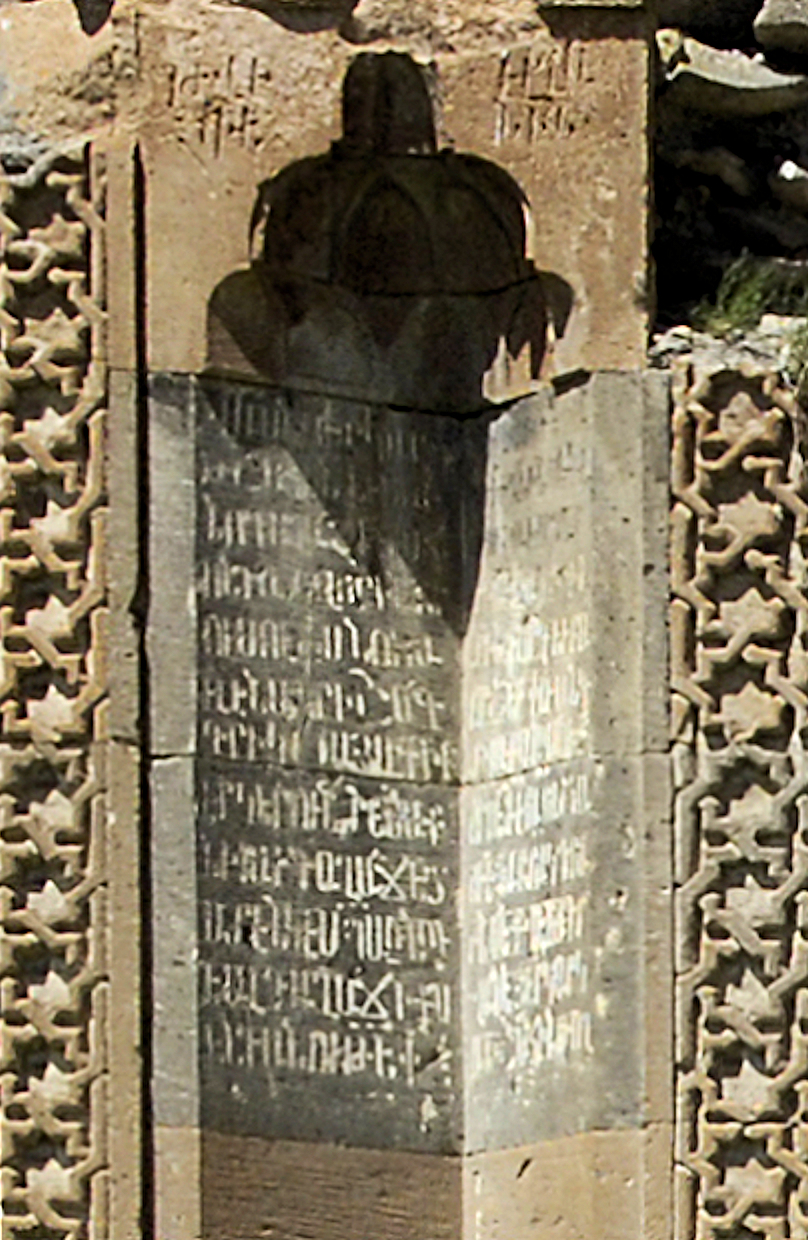
Stone charter of the Il-Khanate for tax purposes, in the Armenian language. Church of the Holy Apostles, Ani, after 1260.

From 1236 to 1250, the Mongols essentially left Armenian governing structures in place. They initially satisfied themselves with plunder and booty from vanquished areas, but from 1243 Guyuk Khan ordered the introduction of permanent formal taxes, consisting in a general tax of 1/13th to 1/10th on every property, and a large head tax of 60 silver drams spitaks (aspers) per male. According to the History of the Nation of the Archers, if a man could not pay, he was beaten, and given alive to the dogs. During the rule of the Il-Khanate under Hulegu (r. 1256–1265), taxes were further increased:

Hulegu commanded that the tax called taghar be collected from each individual listed in the royal register. From such he demanded 100 litrs of grain, 50 litrs of wine, 2 litrs of rice and [of] husks 3 sacks, 1 spitak [silver coin], 1 arrow, to say nothing of the bribes; and of 20 animals they demanded, plus 20 spitaks. From those who could not pay they took their sons and daughters as payment.

— Kirakos Gandzaketsi, History of Armenia, 182.

Since 1251, the Catholicos of Armenian Cilicia Kostandin (1221–1267) had requested the nobles of Greater Armenia to avoid rebellion against the Mongols, in order to help Hethum I obtain diplomatic support from the Mongols against the Mamluks and Seljuks. But a new Mongol tax, called qubchur, forced nobles to mortgage their estates, triggering a revolt of the nobles in 1259–1260, to which Arghun Aqa responded by a virulent military operation. The Georgian Princess Gontsa and the Armenian Prince Zakare were executed, and his father Shahnshah freed for a ramson.

From around 1260, the Il-Khanate inscribed in stone and displayed Imperial decrees in their new territory of Armenia. Several examples have been found at the Church of the Holy Apostles in the capital Ani, inscribed on pilar or walls. These were official announcements, often yarlighs (imperial decrees), using the formulation "[In the name of] the Ilkhan", with the aim of announcing or regulating taxes and import duties. These inscriptions used the Armenian language, but the format and even some of the terminology were Mongol.

=== Political autonomy ===
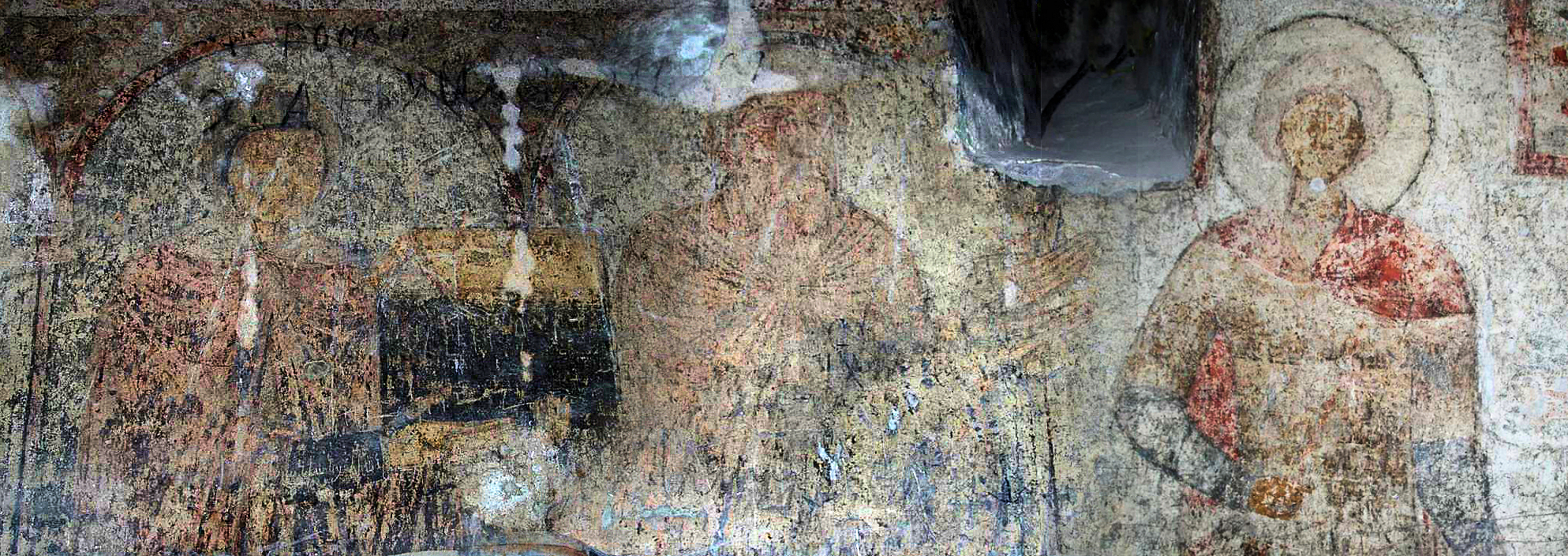
Probable depictions of Shahnshah Zakarian (center), his wife Vaneni (left), and a kindred in military uniform (right), as donators at the Kobayr Monastery, Chapel-Aisle, 1282.

Following the Mongol conquest in 1236, Georgia and the Zakarid principality were organized into a province broken down into 8 administrative units (tumans). 5 of the tumans were Georgian while the remaining 3, composed of the Zakarid principality in Kars and Ani, as well as, the Awagids in Syunik and Artsakh, were Armenian. From 1236 to 1246, the Mongols did not interfere with the governing structure of the Zakarid state and appointed the Zakarids as heads of the tumans. While Zakarid Armenia was a vassal state of the Mongols and therefore subject to taxes and loyalty to the Khan, they were otherwise left to govern themselves and had relative autonomy during this period.

Throughout the 13th century, the high offices Atabeg (Governor General) and Amirspasalar (Commander-in-Chief of the Georgian army) had been held by the Zakarids, but following the Mongol invasions of Georgia the Mongol victors gave these offices to the "renegade" Sadun of Mankaberd in 1272. When Abaqa became the new Mongol ruler, Sadun received from the title of Atabeg Amirspasalar for the Georgian Bagratid Kingdom.

=== Warfare ===
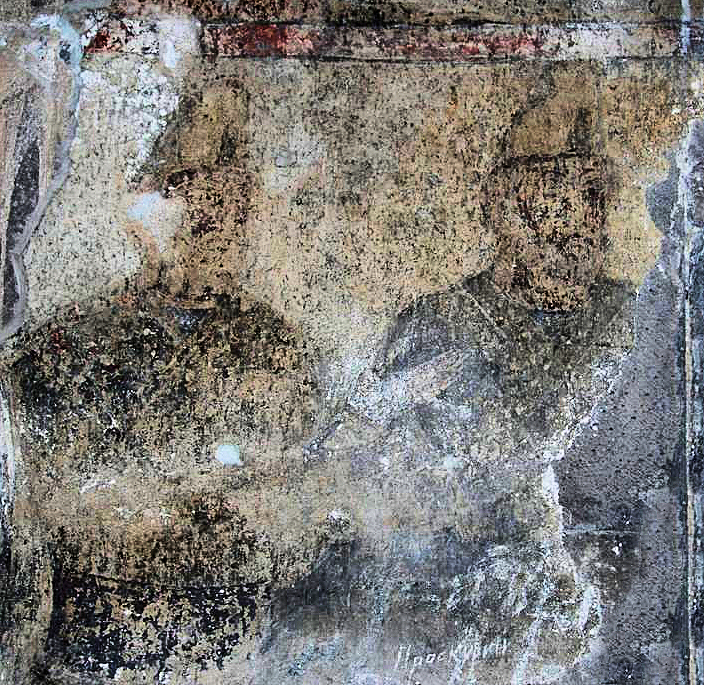
Soldiers in uniform, Kobayr Monastery, 1270s

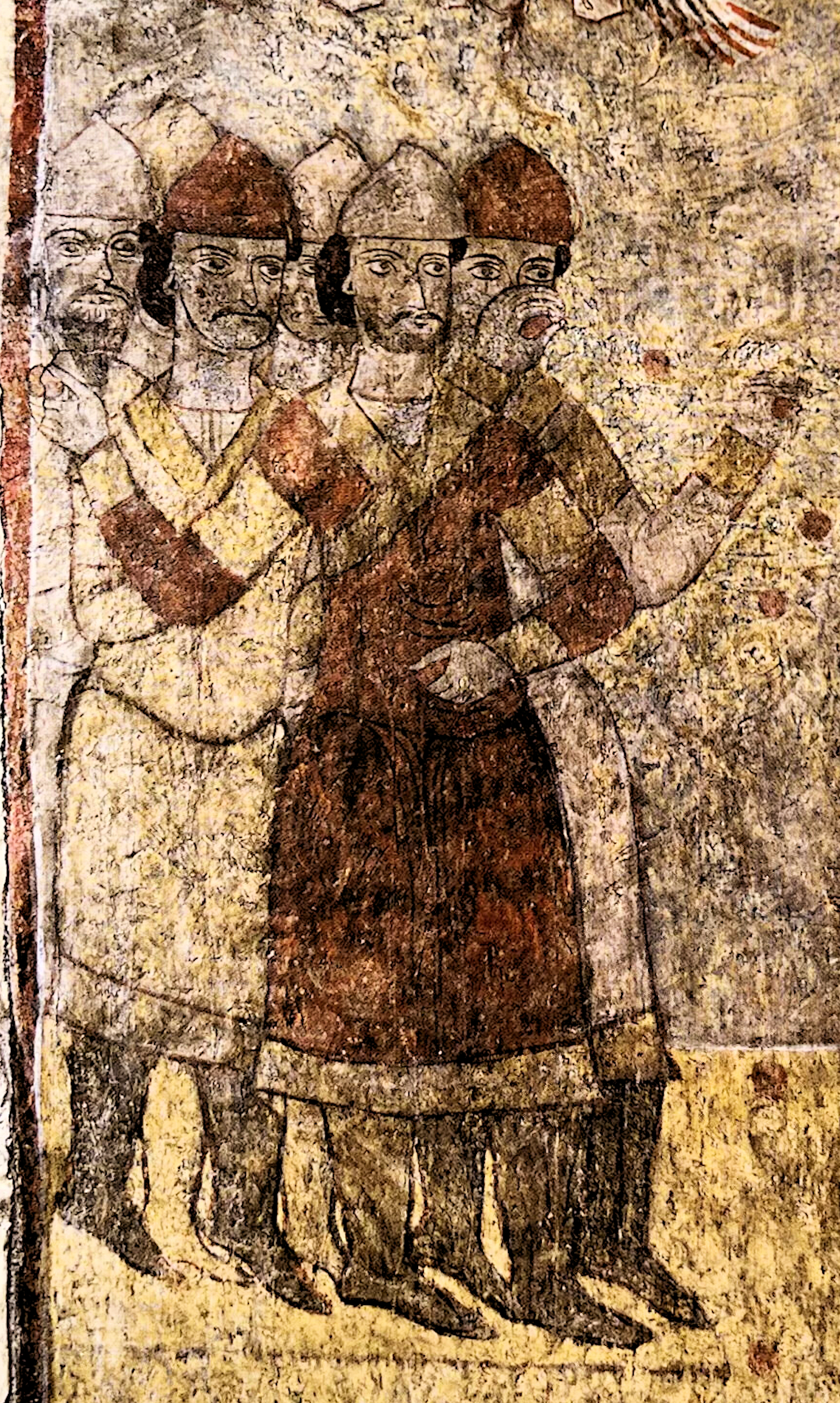
Detail of mural, Dadivank, 1290-1305.

The Armenians had to participate to most of the campaigns of the Mongols. They participated to the Siege of Baghdad in 1258. In 1259–1260, Shahnshah Zakarian participated to the Mongold-led Siege of Mayyāfāriqīn, together with the Armenian Prince Prosh Khaghbakian. The reduced Kingdom of Georgia (1256–1329) also under Mongol control, participated to most of these campaigns as well.

In 1265, Armenian and Georgian troops participated to the conflict between the Golden Horde and the Ilkhanate, ultimately defeating Berke in Shirvan.

In 1284, Georgian and Armenian troops had to participate in the dynastic conflict between the Il-Khanate ruler Tekuder and Arghun, with troops under the Vicery of Georgia Alinaq Noyan and under Tekuder himself.

=== Monastic sponsorship ===
Under Mongol rule, Armenia enjoyed relative political stability and prosperity from the end of the 13th century to the early 14th century. The Armenians enjoyed a favorable relationship with the Mongol ruler Arghun, whom they had supported in his dynastic struggle against Tekuder: as a result Arghun supported Armenian nobles, and in particular the church, and exempted 150 monasteries from taxes.

In particular, the Syunik Province became a center of intellectual, literary and artistic creativity. Monastic institutions grew under the patronage of the Proshians and the Orbelians, who built numerous monasteries and provided them with various financial resources. Smbat Orbelian (1249/50-73) had obtained from Möngke Khan that monastic properties which had been seized should be returned, and that they would be free from taxation. This tax-exempt status, contrasting with the generally heavy taxation of private property under the Mongols, encouraged nobility to transfer part of their wealth for safeguarding to monastic institutions, either temporarily or permanently, all of this secured by Mongol edicts. In some cases, members of the nobility could become abbots, so as to secure the direct ownership and management of these ecclesiastical resources. Some of the main monastic holdings were in the monasteries of Kecharuyk and Geghard, Aghjots Vank or the Tanahat Monastery (1273–1279). From this period, the Church of Areni was built in 1321 by Bishop Yovhannes Orbelian under the artistic supervisation of Momik, while the church of Spitakavor Monastery was built in 1321 by the Proshyan family.

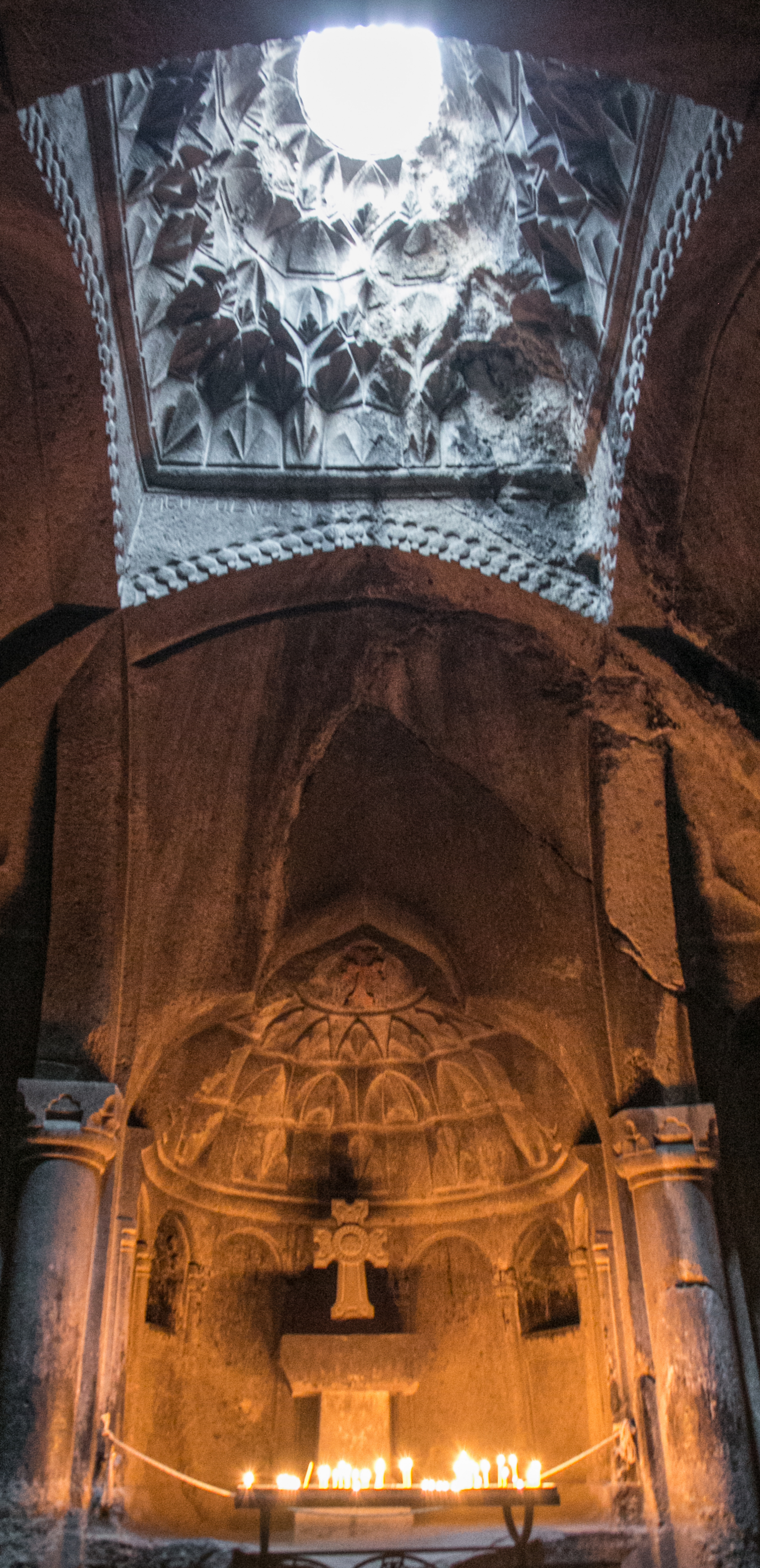
Zakarid rock-cut church, Geghard, circa 1240.

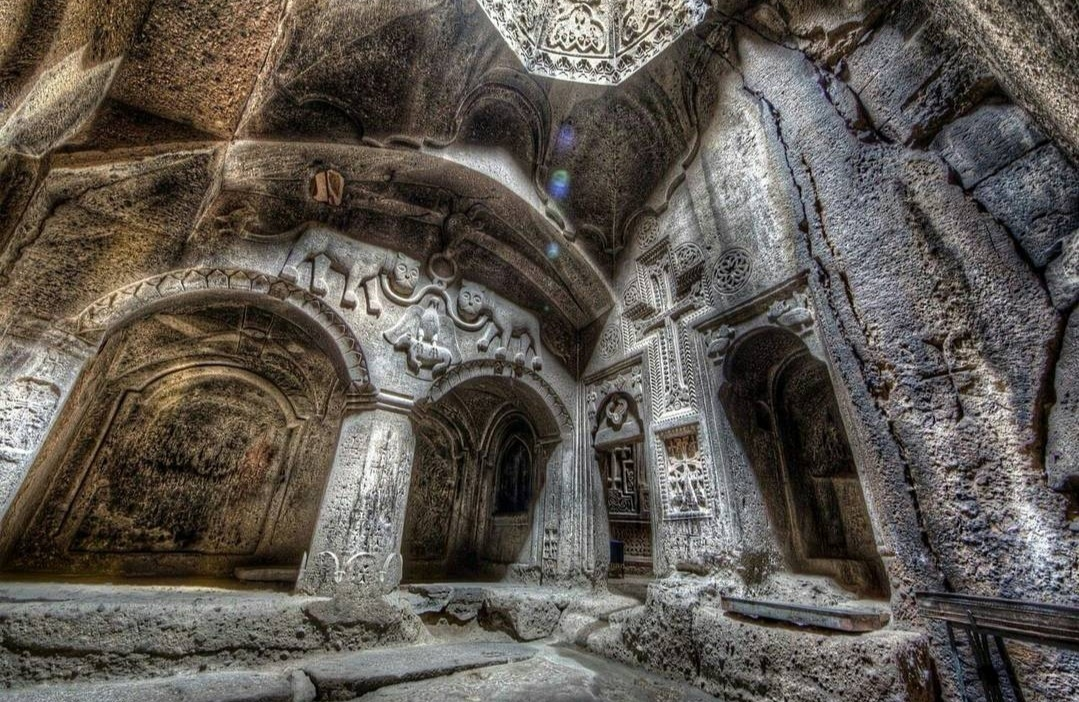
Mausoleum of Prince Prosh Khaghbakian (1283) in Geghard monastery.

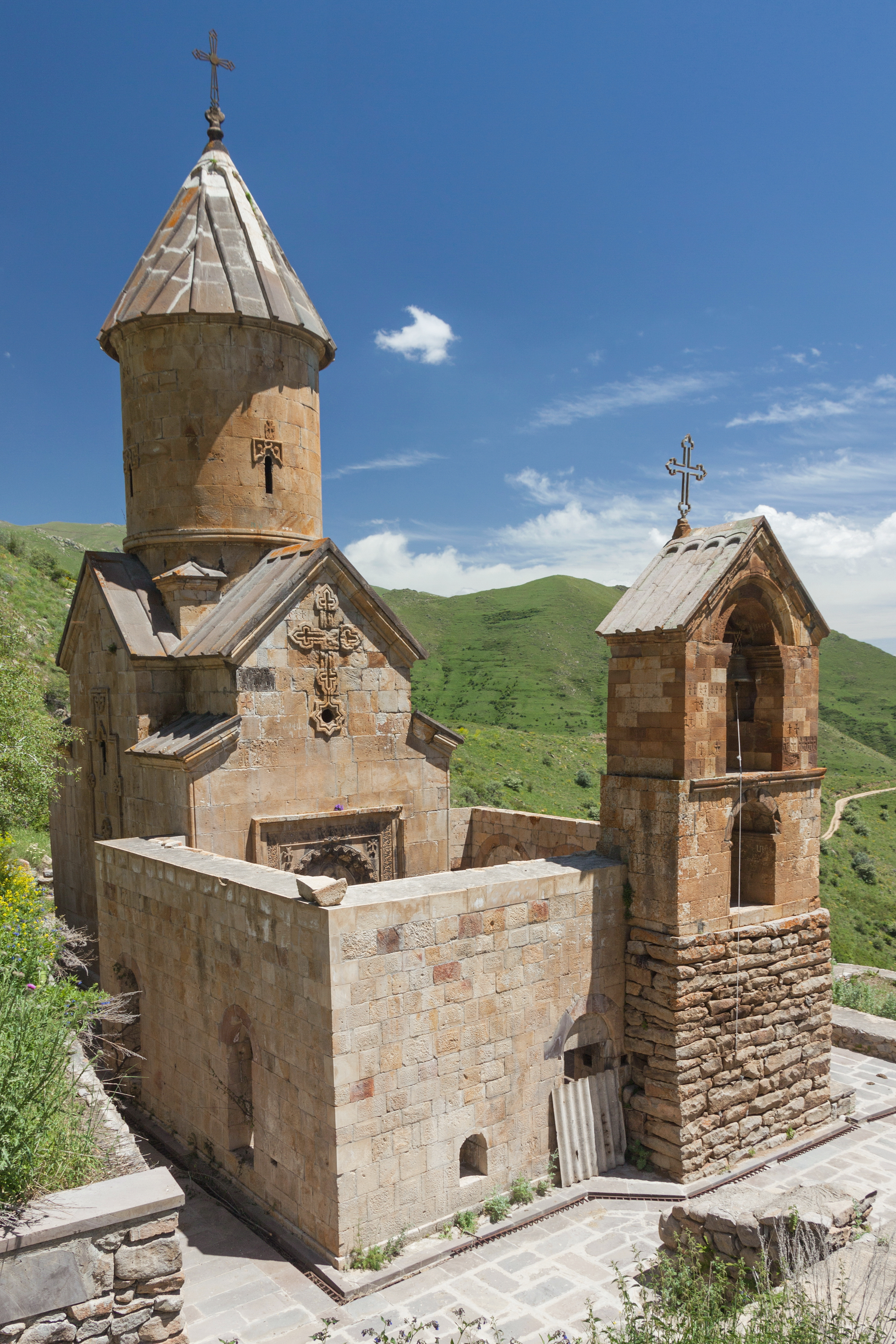
Spitakavor Monastery, built in 1321 by the Proshyan family

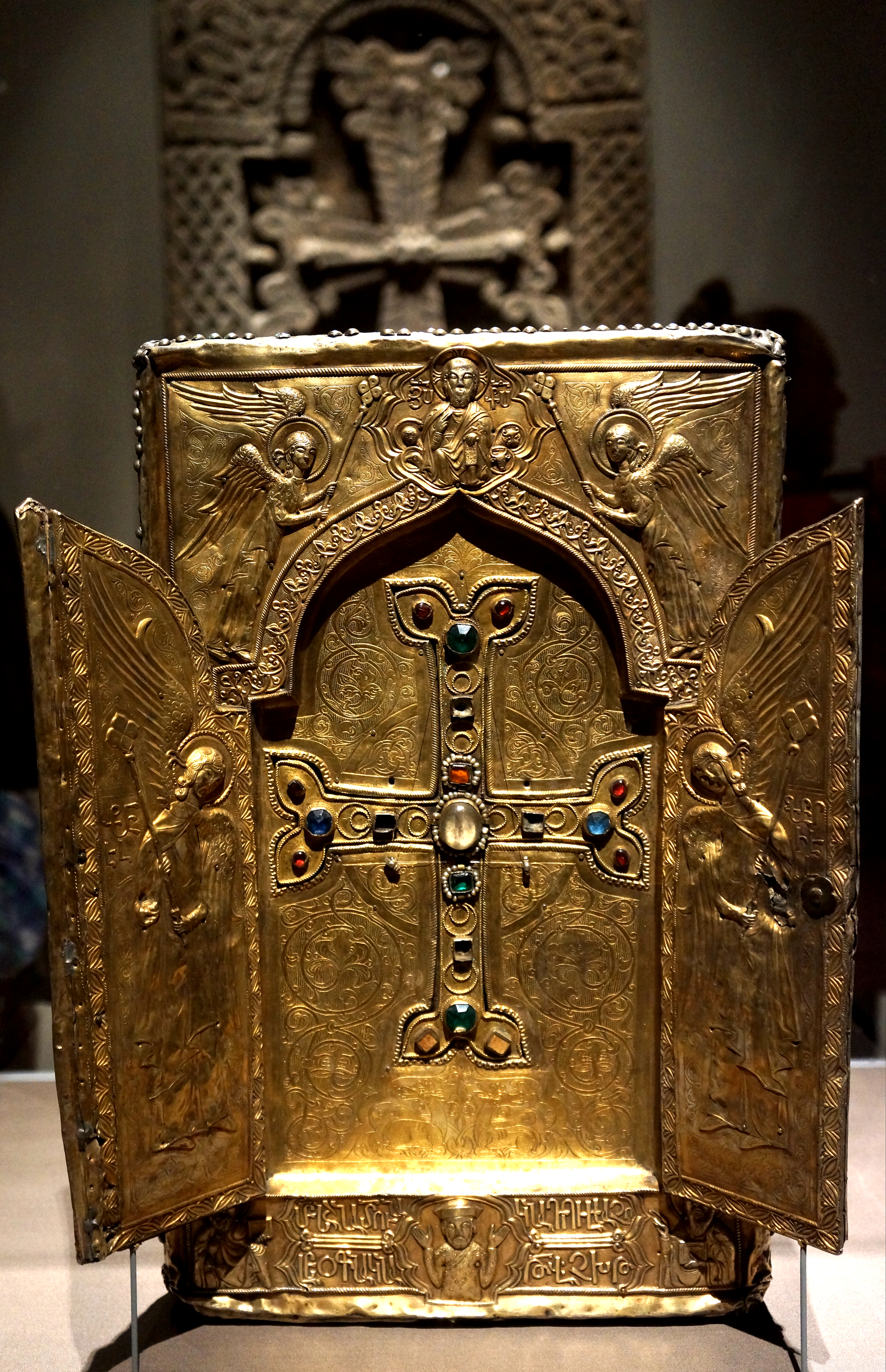
Reliquary of the Holy Cross of the Vegetarians (Khotakerats), dedicated in 1300 by Prince Eacchi Proshian

=== Clothing styles and depictions ===
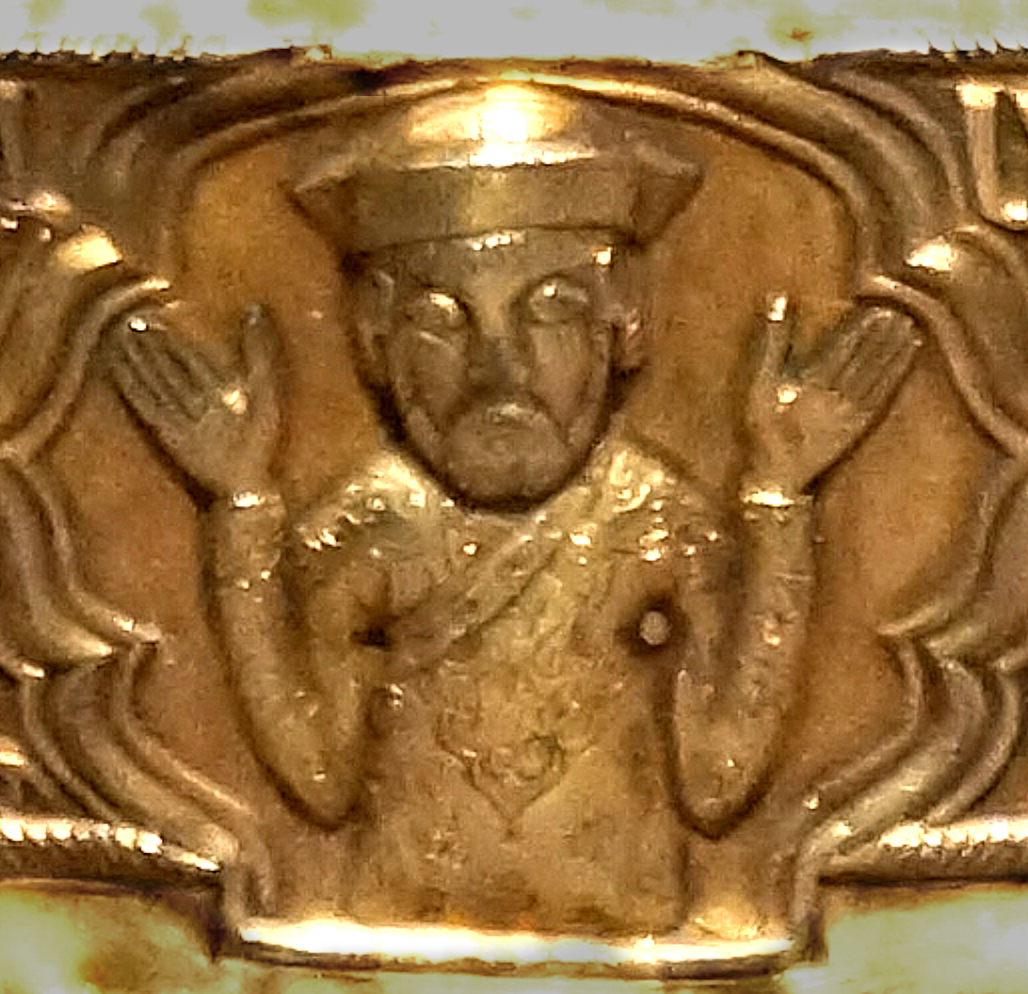
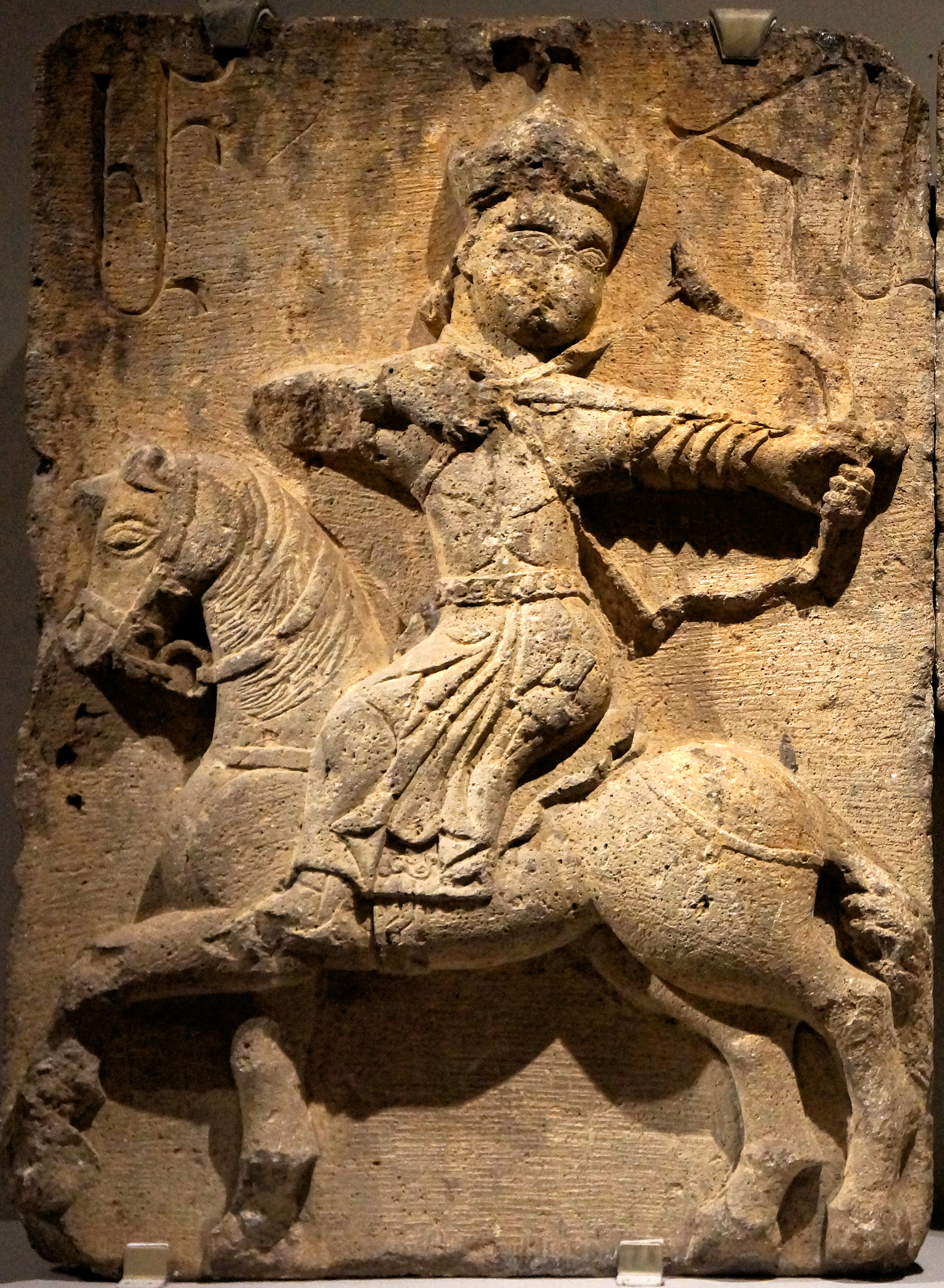
Armenian Prince Eacch'i Proshian wearing a Mongol-style dress (cloud collar and Mongol hat), c. 1300 on the Reliquary of the "Holy Cross of the Vegetarians", and his son Amir Hasan II (letters ԱՄՐ ՀՍ "AMR HS") hunting on horseback in Mongol attire, Church of the White Virgin (completed 1321). History Museum of Armenia, Yerevan.

A few depictions of Armenians under Mongol rule are known, as in the Spitakavor Monastery, which was built by two princes from the Zakarid Proshian dynasty in 1318–1321, the father Eachi and his son Amir Hasan. The construction of the church was begun by Prince Eachi Proshian (died in 1318) (a grandson of Prosh Khaghbakian), and completed in 1321 by his son Prince Amir Hasan II. Eachi Proshian (-1318) is depicted in one reliefs from Spitakavor, and on a golden reliquary, he which he shown holding his hands up in prayer, and wearing a Mongol-style dress (cloud collar).

Also from the Monastery, a relief represents a young rider in princely attire with a bow, with the letters ԱՄՐ ՀՍ (AMR HS), indicating Prince Amir Hasan II of the Proshians, son of Eachi Proshian, who completed the church his father had started. The relief is dated to 1320–1322, date the church was completed. In these depictions, the Proshyans wear close-fitting clothing with an ornate belt and tall hats, and have round cheeks and almond-shaped eyes in a style characteristic of Mongol-era Armenia. Riding a horse, Prince Amir Hasan wears a close-fitting tunic and a three-pointed hat with two ribbons, characteristic of 14th century Mongol nobility, and his facial features are similar to those of the Mongols. Prince Eacchi Proshian on his reliquary, dated circa 1300, is shown wearing a Mongol-style royal dress (cloud collar).

=== Mongol control in the 14th century ===
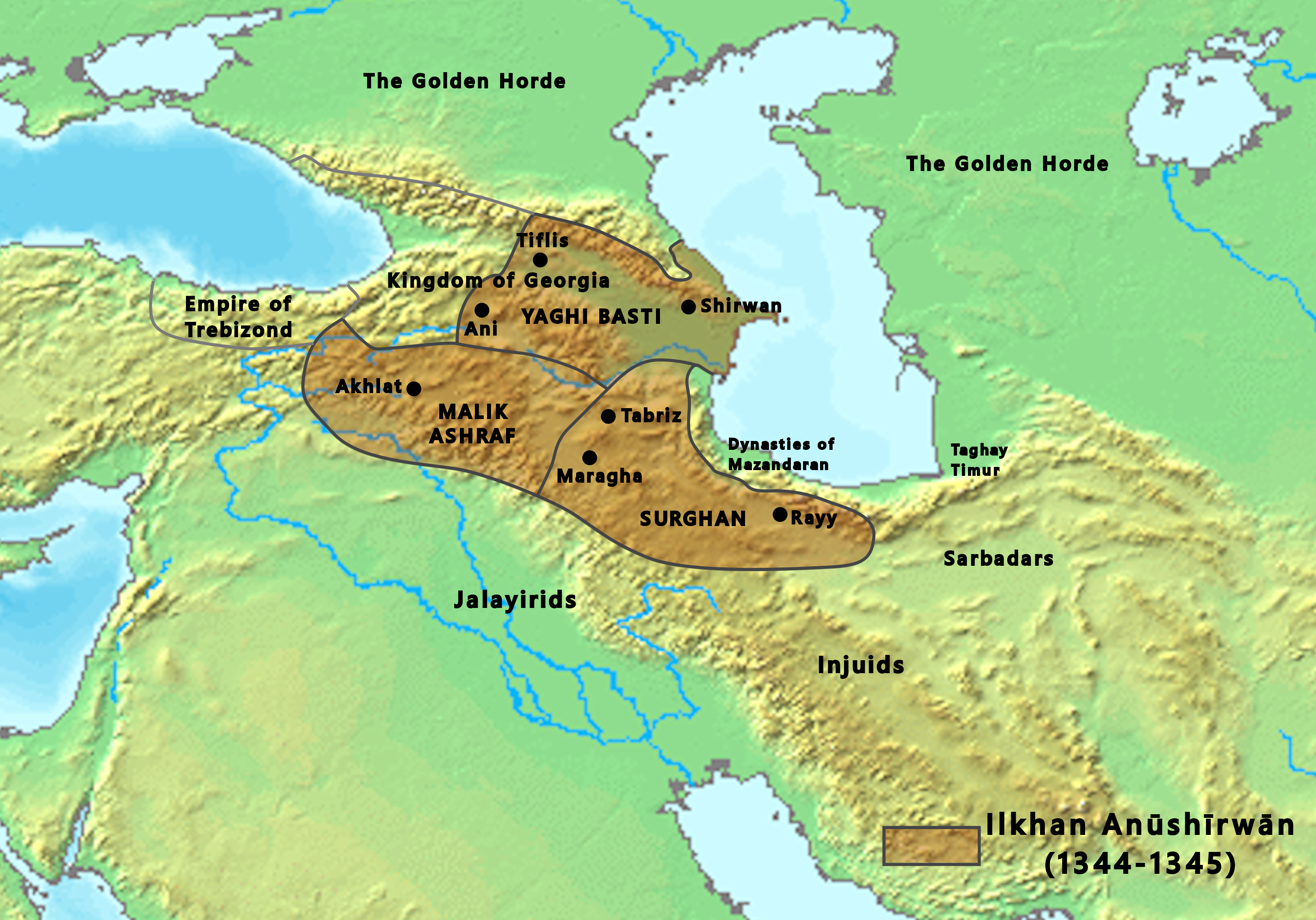
Repartition of Anūshīrwān’s domains according to the agreement of 745 (1344–5) among the Chopanids Malek Ashraf, Yagi Basti and Surghan.

Ilkhanid rule continued uninterrupted until the death of the last Ilkhanid emperor Abu Sa'id Bahadur Khan in 1335. From 1335, various Mongol factions vied for power, successively occupying Zakarid Armenia and minting their coinage in Ani. First were the Jalayirid Muhammad Khan, followed by the Chobanids with their puppet rulers Suleiman Khan and Anushirwan, again followed by the Turco-Mongol Jalayirids. The Jalayirids ruled Armenia until the conquests of Timur from 1386.

Between 1386 and 1404, the Turco-Mongol forces of Timur raided the countries of Transcaucasia from their bases in northern Iran. Tiflis was finally conquered by Timur in 1404, and King George VII was forced to recognize Timurid suzerainty. Armenia too, which had been under Mongol Jalayirid control, was incorporated into the Timurid realm.

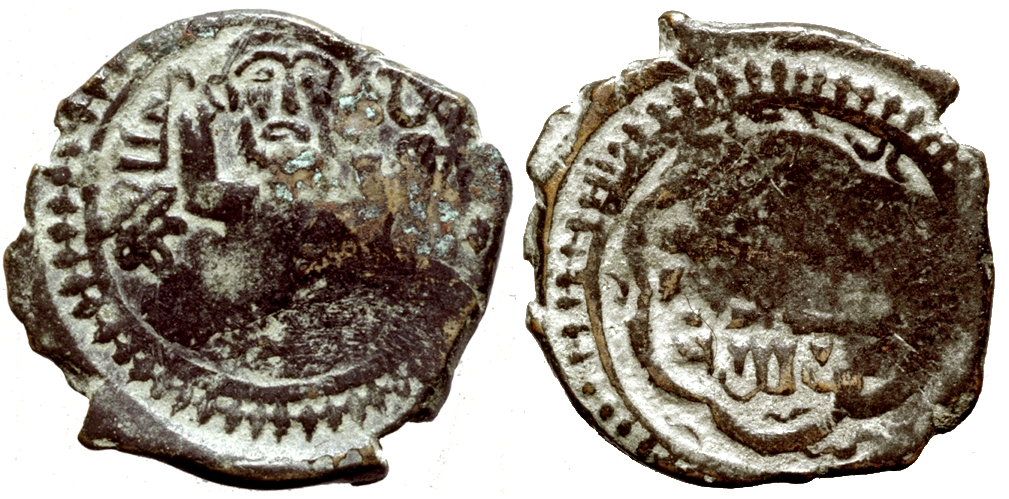
Copper Alloy Fals of Sulayman Khan, with orans figure. Ani mint, (1339–1343)

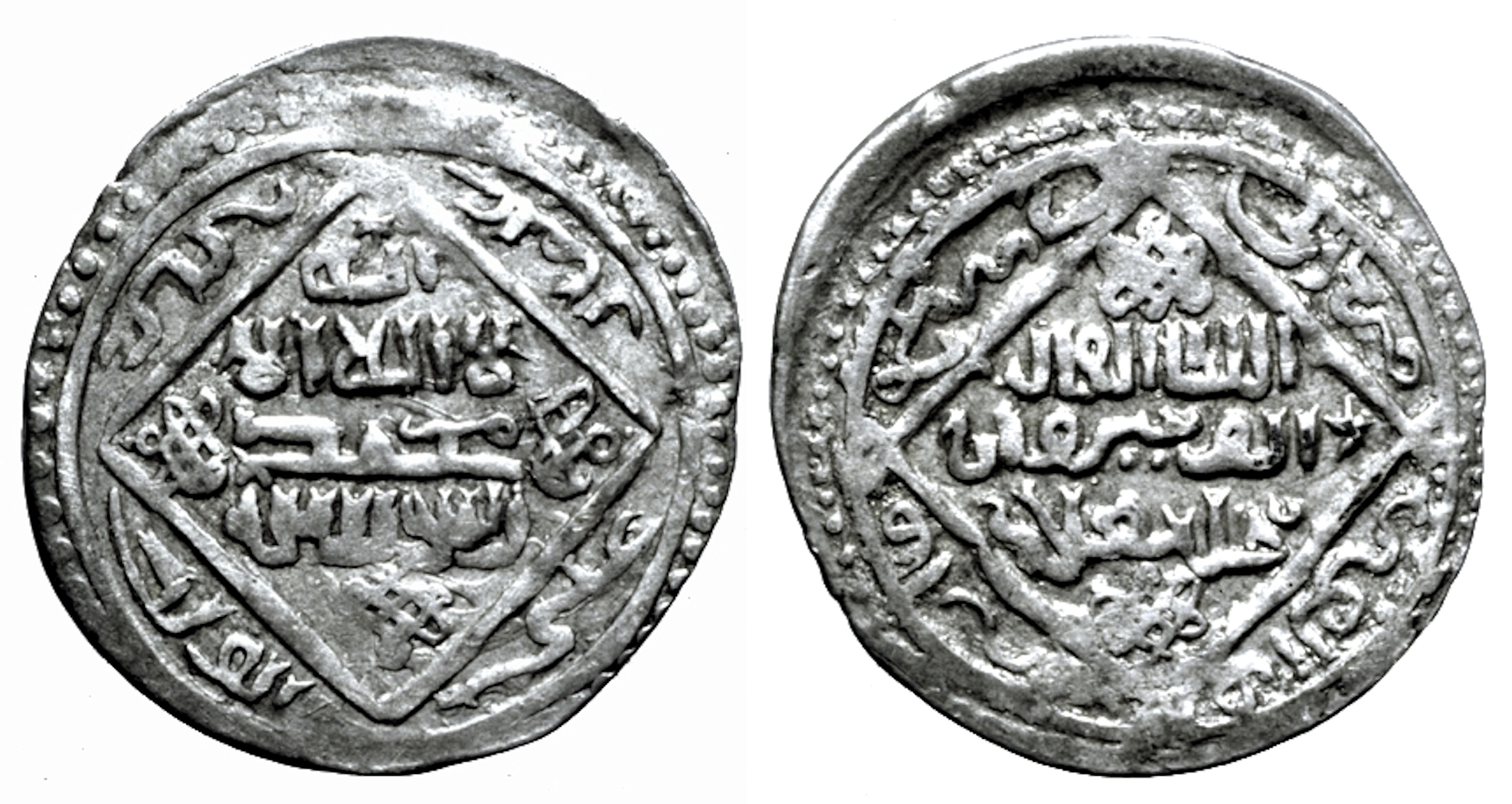
Silver Dirham of Anushirwan, Ani mint, 747 H (1346–1347)

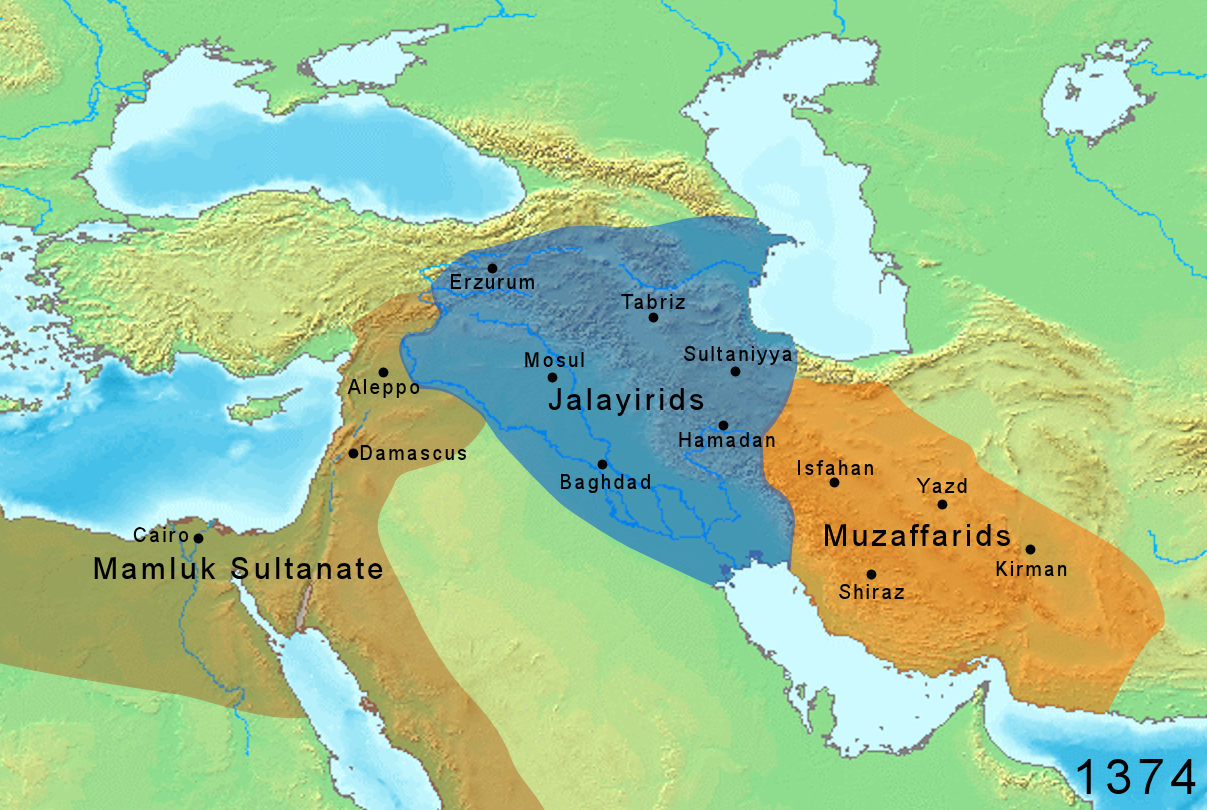
Extent of Jalayirid territory in 1374 ( )

== Inscriptions ==
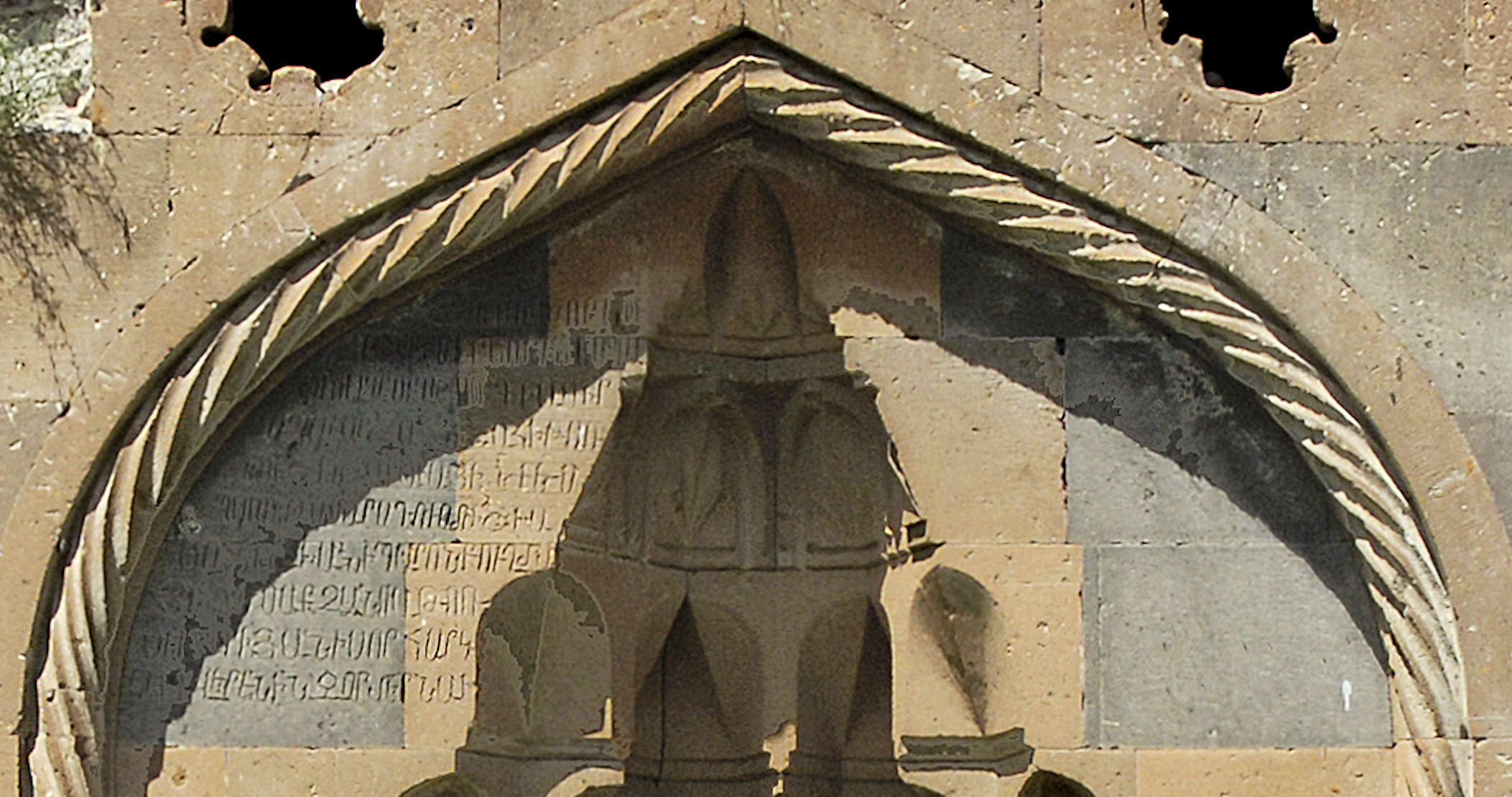
Inscription by Agbugha I, son of Shahnshah I Zakarian, on the façade of the Church of the Holy Apostles in Ani, 1253-1276.

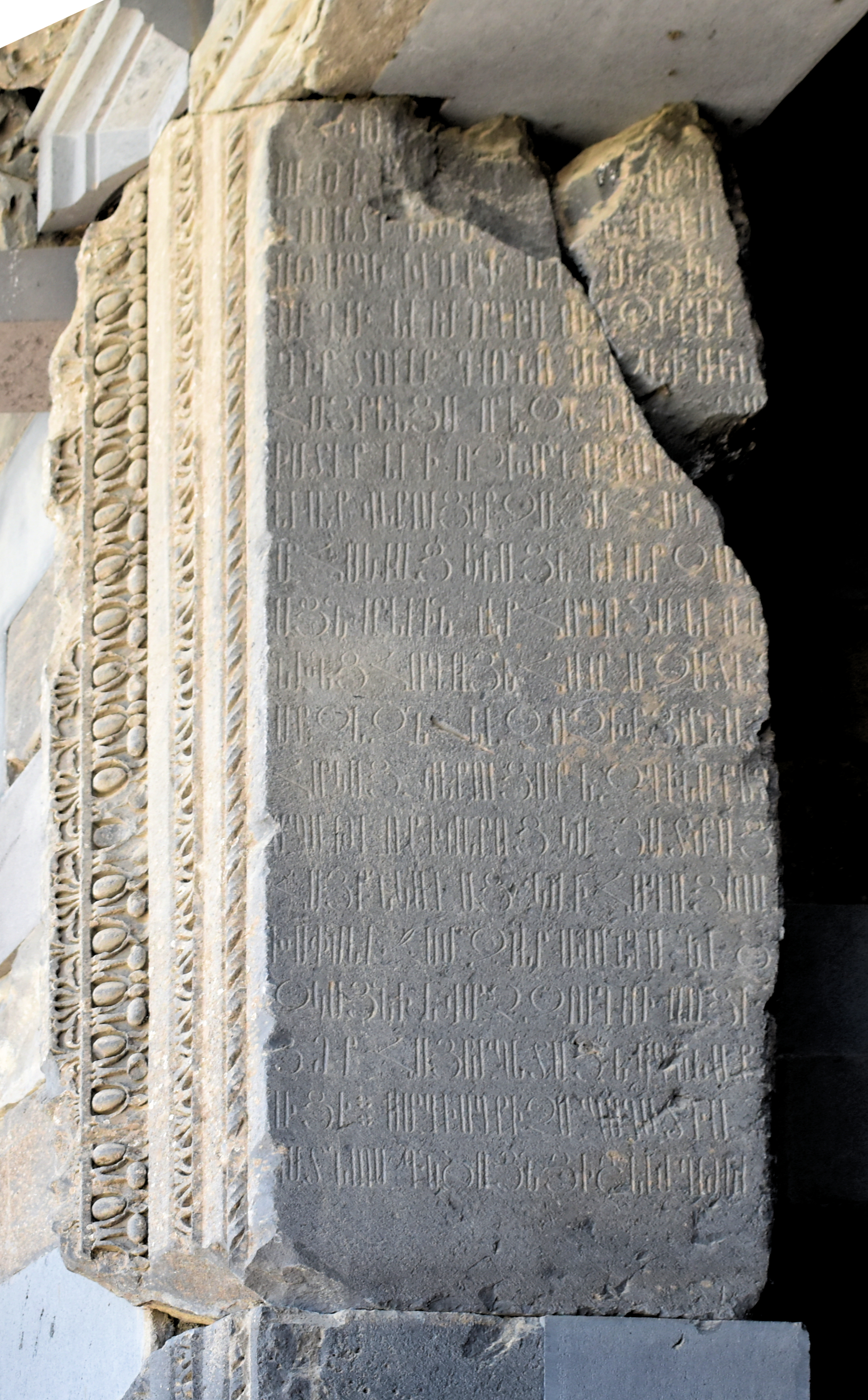
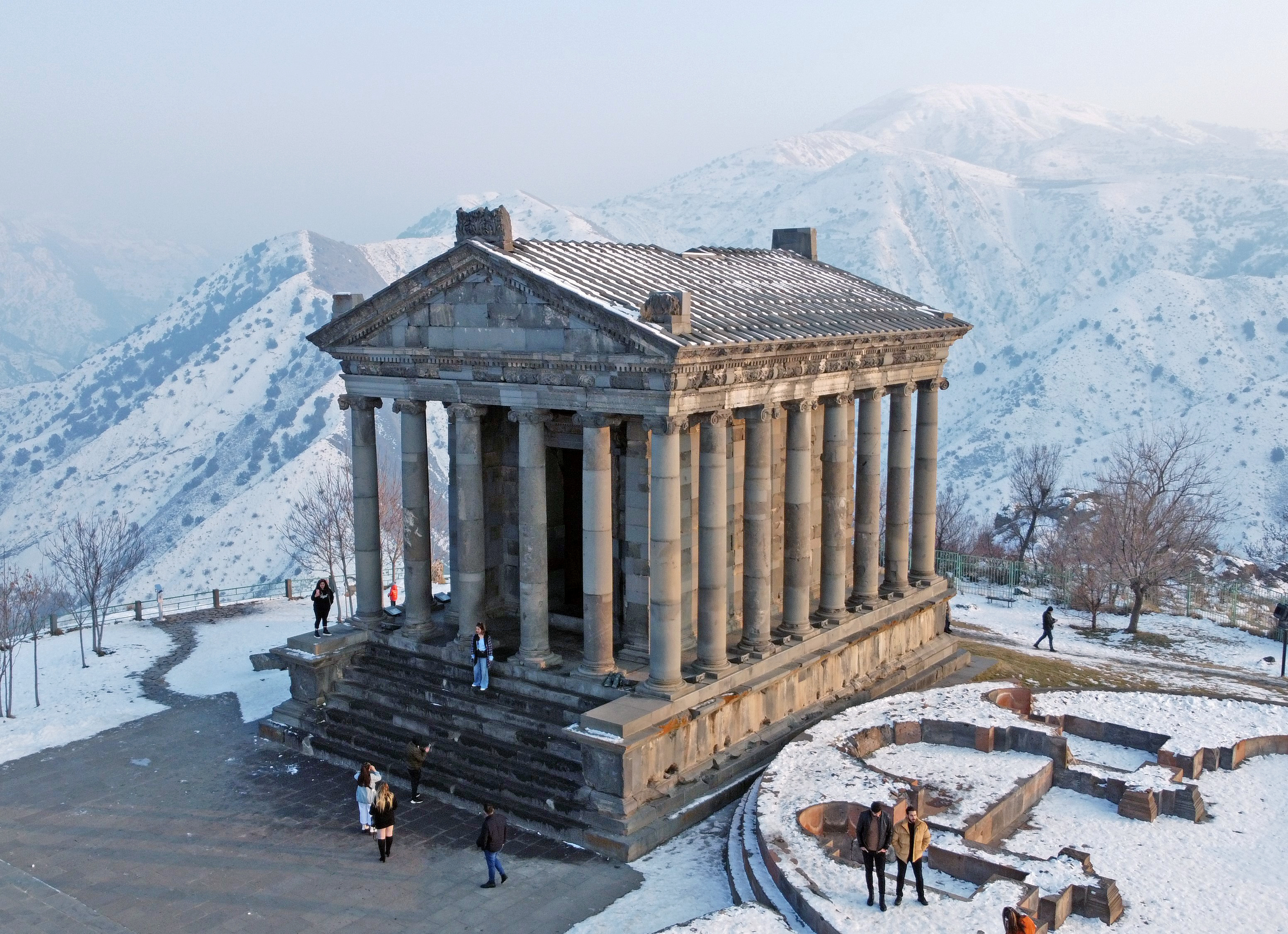
1291 inscription at Garni Temple by Princess Khoshak Zakarian, widow of Shams al-Din Juvayni.

The Zakarids are known from quite a few inscriptions over Armenia, especially in monasteries, and particularly at Ani, the Armenian capital. Some of their important inscriptions include:

- A 1200 inscription on the Church of Saint Elia at Ani reports its building by Zakare II Zakarian, amirspasalar (Commander-in-Chief of the Georgian army), at the time of Queen Tamar (ruled 1184–1213):
- A 1253-1276 inscription by Agbugha I, son of Shahnshah I lamenting about high taxes in Ani. Church of the Holy Apostles.
- A 1291 inscription at Garni Temple by Princess Khoshak Zakarian, widow of Shams al-Din Juvayni, and back from living 15 years in Persia.
- A 1303 inscription by Agbugha II, son of Ivane II, lamenting about the high level of taxes, and announcing the cancellation of several of them. Church of the Holy Apostles.
- A 1320 inscription by Princess Kuandze, wife of Shahnshah II Zakarian, lamenting the death of her husband, and announcing the lifting of taxes. Church of the Holy Apostles:

In 769 (ie 1320), by the mercy of God, I Khuandze, wife of Atabek Shahnshah (II) who died in this year, and caused us and our eastern country a great affliction, me, his wife, daughter of Chamchadin Sahip-Divan and of the Baroness Khorichah, (great-) granddaughter of the Atabek Ivane (I), as well as my son Zacharia (IV), for the salvation of the soul of the master and for the longevity of my brothers, we have waived in our heritage town of Ani the right to the counting of cows and donkeys, as well as on large and small entry permits. Anyone who attempts to put an obstacle to our dispositions, whether he is Armenian, Georgian or Mongolian, may he be judged and condemned by God, may he share the fate of Satan and may he be his co-inhabitant of the gehenna; let the Georgian be excommunicated and cursed; the Mongol be covered with shame and guilt before the prophets glorified in God; but may those who observe our provisions until the end of the world be blessed by Almighty God. Let anyone who opposes it be anathema, like Judas and like Cain. These favors and this charity were established under the government of Baron Lip. Ptough the scribe.

— Inscription of Princess Kuandze at the Church of the Holy Apostles at Ani, 1320.

== Sources ==
- Baumer, Christoph (2024). History of the Caucasus. Volume 2: In the shadow of great powers / Christoph Baumer. London New York: I.B. Tauris. ISBN 9780755636303.
- Bournoutian, George (1993). A History of the Armenian People: Pre-History to 1500 A.D. Vol. 1. Costa Mesa, CA: Mazda Publishers. ISBN 0939214962.
- Dadoyan, Seta (2018). "Samuel Anets'i and his continuators". In Thomas, David; Chesworth, John A. (eds.). Christian-Muslim Relations. A Bibliographical History. Volume 12 Asia, Africa and the Americas (1700-1800). Vol. 12. Germany: BRILL. pp. 426–447. ISBN 9789004384163.
- Dashdondog, Bayarsaikhan (2010). "Mongol Administration in Greater Armenia (1243–1275)". In Drompp, Michael; Deweese, Devin (eds.). The Mongols and the Armenians (1220-1335). Brill's Inner Asian Library. Vol. 24. Leiden: Brill. pp. 99–120. doi:10.1163/9789004192119_006. ISBN 978-90-04-19211-9.
- Suny, Ronald Grigor (1994). The Making of the Georgian Nation. Indiana University Press. pp. 39–40. ISBN 0-253-20915-3.
- Kitagawa, Sei-ichi'. The Rise of the Artsrunisand the rl-Kha-nid Rule over Georgia. The Historical Society of Japan.
- Dashdondog, Bayarsaikhan (2020). Armenian Lords and Mongol Court. Conference: Armenology in Mongolia.
- Dashdondog, Bayarsaikhan (2011). The Mongols and the Armenians (1220-1335) (PDF). Brill. ISBN 978-90-04-18635-4.
- Kalas, Veronica (2008). "The Georgian Aspects of Medieval Architecture at Ani in the Thirteenth Century: The Church of Tigran Honents and the Mosque of Minuchir". In Tumanishvili, D. (ed.). Georgian Arts in the Context of European and Asian Cultures. Tbilissi: Georgia Arts and Cultural Center. pp. 211–216.
- Blessing, Patricia (8 March 2017). Architecture and Landscape in Medieval Anatolia, 1100-1500. Edinburgh University Press. pp. 156–159. ISBN 978-1-4744-1130-1.
