= Church of Saint Elia, Kizkale =

Church in Turkey

Coordinates: 40.496342°N 43.568615°E

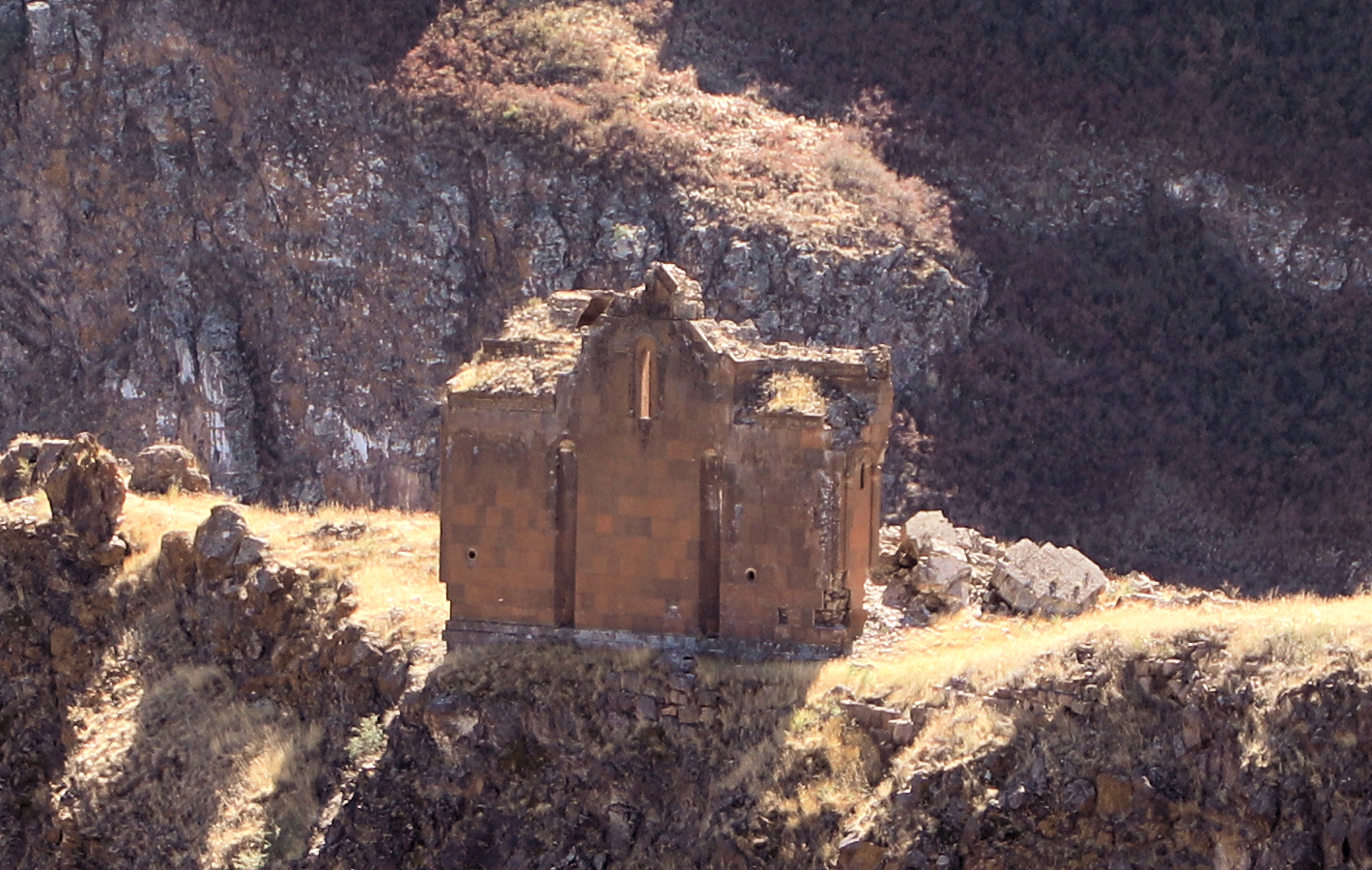
Church of Saint Elia, Kizkale

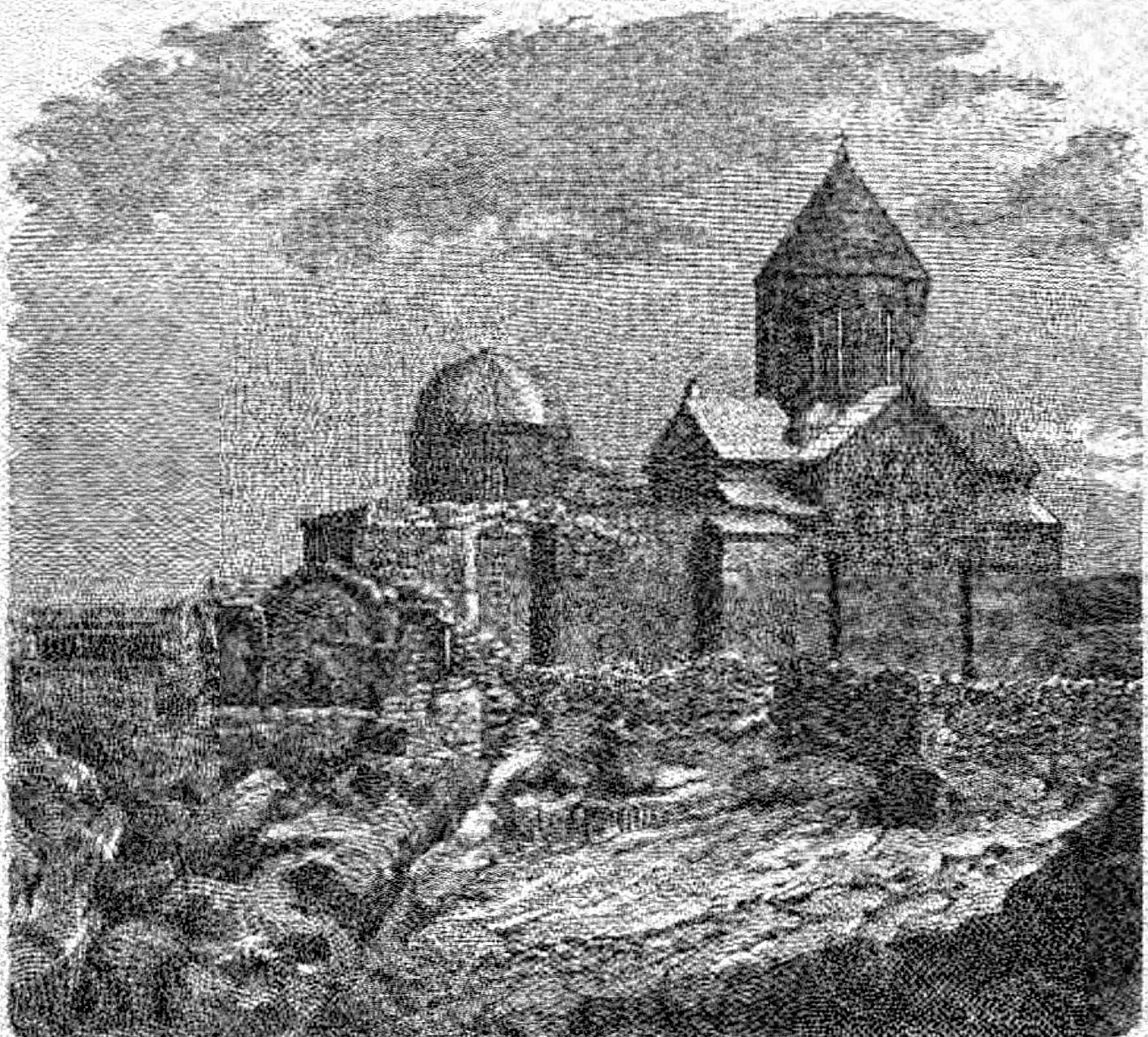
Church of Saint Elia, Kizkale, in 1881.

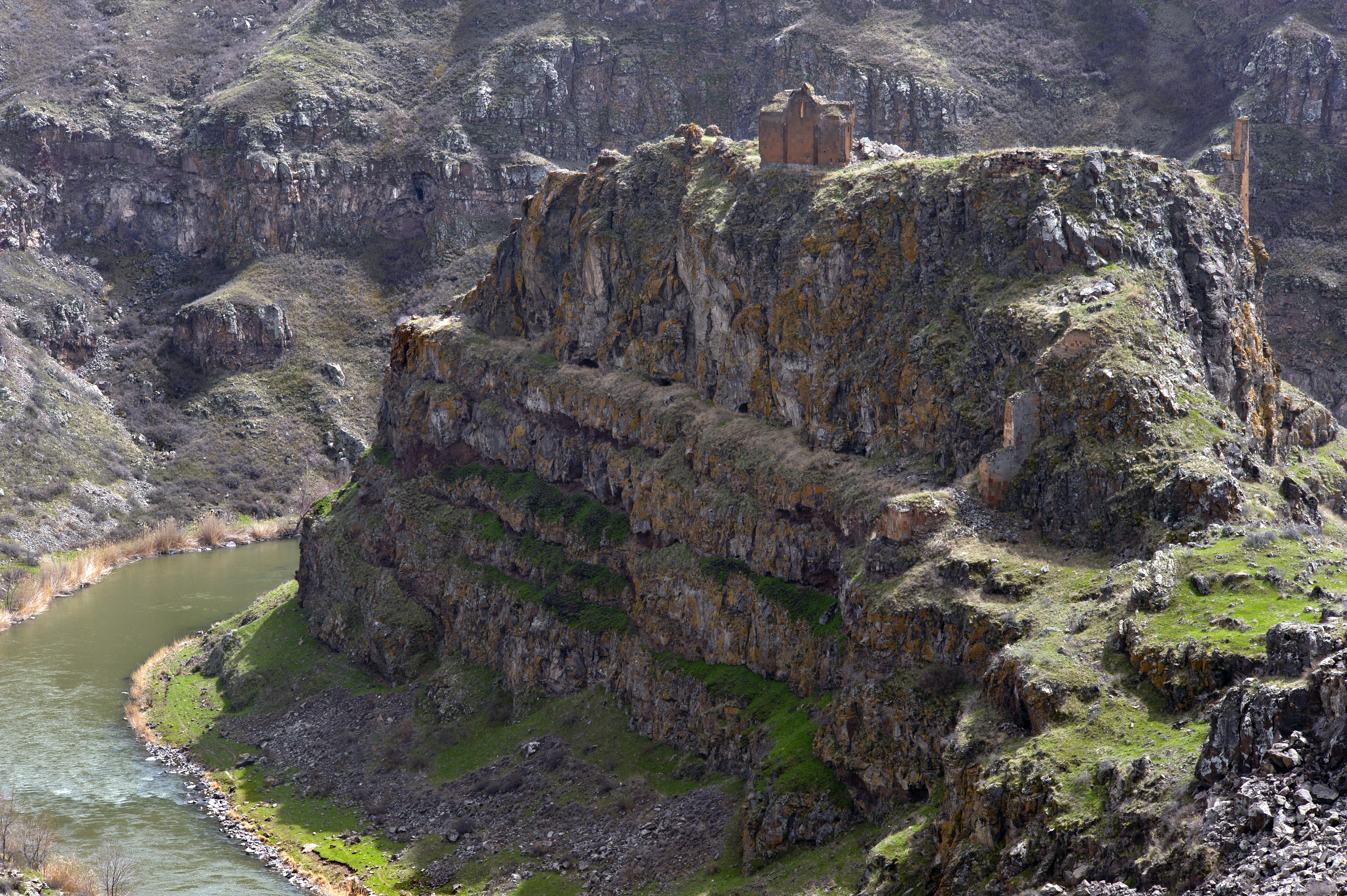
Church of Saint Elia, Kizkale, on its promontory.

The Church of Saint Elia also Zakare's church, is located in Kizkale, near Ani in Turkey. It was built by the Zakarids in the early 13th century, as well as the nearby church of Tigran Honents.

The building of the church came at a tumultuous period: in 1064 the city of Ani had been captured by the Seljuks from the Byzantines, who granted it to a Kurdish line of Muslim emirs known as the Sheddadids. Then in 1199, the Zakarids, vassals of the Kingdom of Georgia, captured Ani with a combined Georgian and Armenian army. Ani was then captured and destroyed by the Mongols in 1239.

Part of an inscription on the church reports its building at the time of Queen Tamar (ruled 1184–1213) by Zakare amirspasalar (Commander-in-Chief of the Georgian army), probably circa 1200:

In the time of the queen of Queen T'amar, annointed by God and pious, I, Shahanshah Zak'aria amirspasalar, her faithful servant, son of the great Sargis Mkhargrtzeli, by the will of God erected this monument... in this monastery, close to the church built by our Illuminator, Saint Grigor."

— Part of an inscription on the walls of the Saint Elia church.

In another part of the inscription the brothers Ivane and Zakare are described as "Kings of Armenia".

Parts of the church have collapsed in the 1988 earthquake.

== Sources ==
- Kalas, Veronica (2008). "The Georgian Aspects of Medieval Architecture at Ani in the Thirteenth Century: The Church of Tigran Honents and the Mosque of Minuchir". In Tumanishvili, D. (ed.). Georgian Arts in the Context of European and Asian Cultures. Tbilissi: Georgia Arts and Cultural Center. pp. 211–216.
- Blessing, Patricia (8 March 2017). Architecture and Landscape in Medieval Anatolia, 1100-1500. Edinburgh University Press. pp. 156–159. ISBN 978-1-4744-1130-1.
