= Khoshak Zakarian =

Member of the Zakarid dynasty (c. 1235 – after 1299)

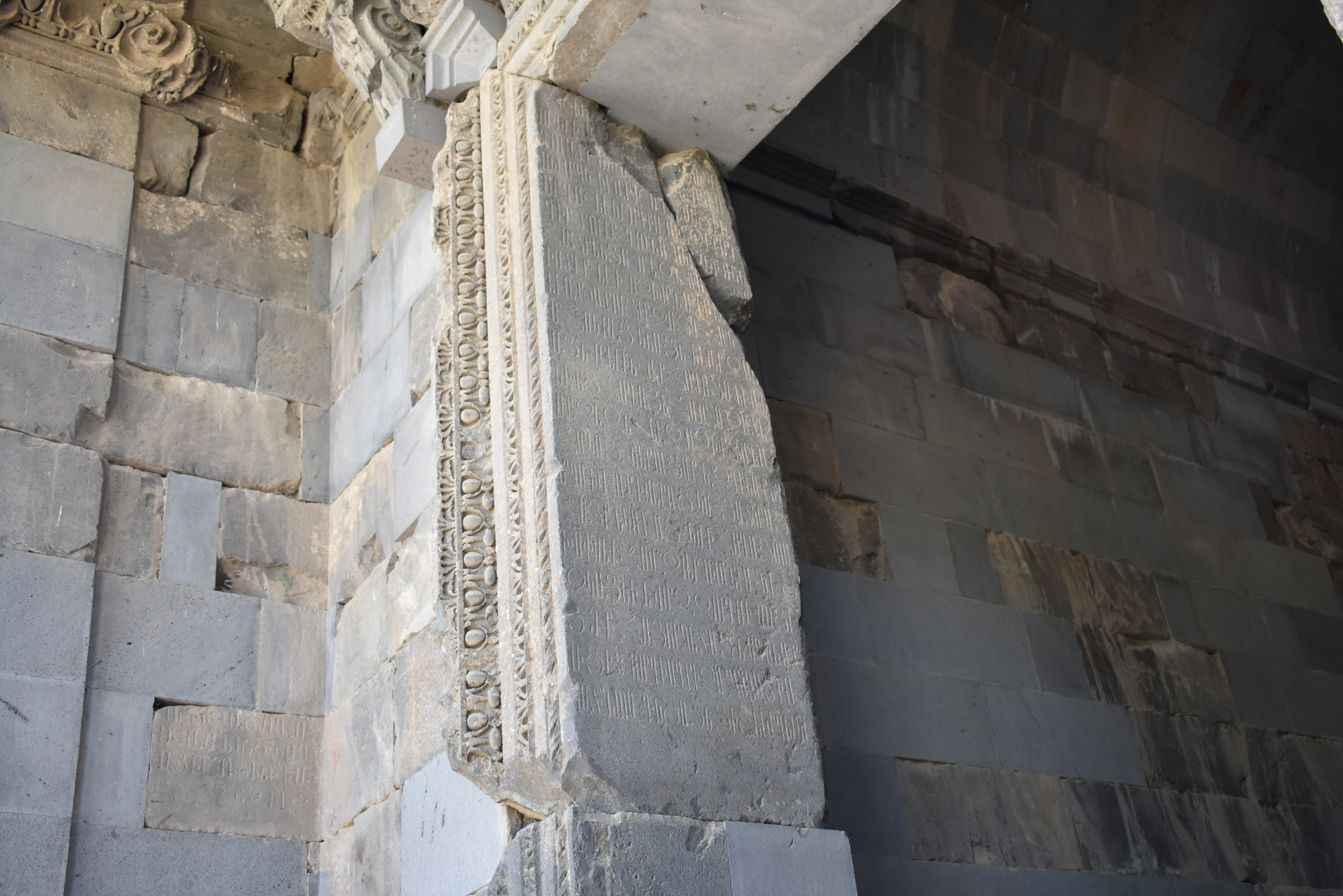
The inscription left by Khoshak at Garni Temple in 1291.

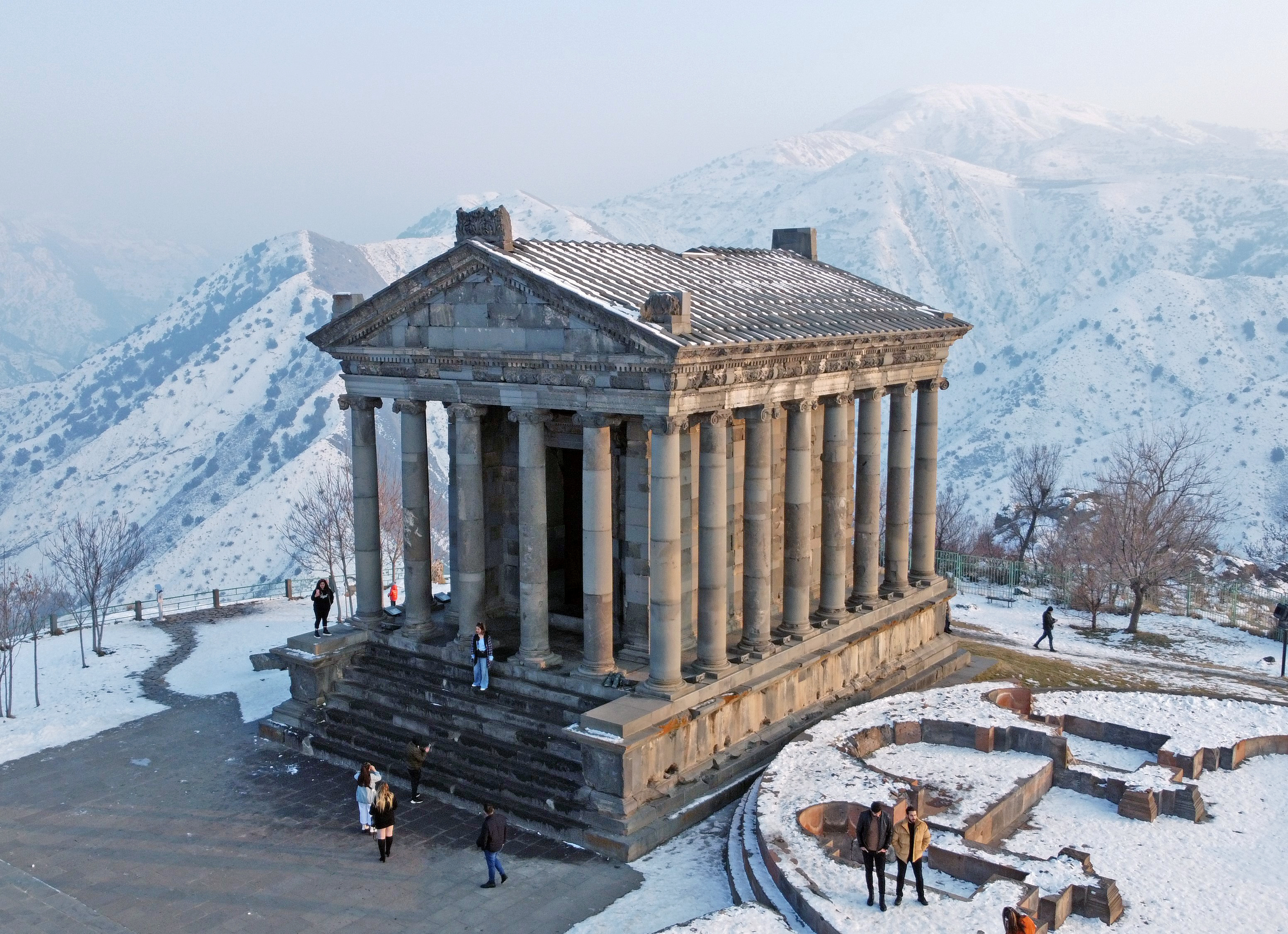
Garni Temple in 2021

Khoshak Zakarian (Armenian: Խոսրովակ Զաքարյան), also Khuashak , Khvashak or Xvashak (born circa 1235, died after 1299), was a female member of the Zakarid dynasty of Armenia in the 14th century CE. She was the daughter of Avag Zakarian, an important prince, Lord High Constable of Georgia, and Gvantsa, a noblewoman who went on to become queen of Georgia. She was the granddaughter of Ivane I Zakarian (commander of Georgian-Armenian forces in the early 13th century).

After her father died, she was put under the protection of Sadun Artsruni, the powerful Atabeg (Governor General) of Georgia, who acted as a chamberlain to her.

Khoshak was married to Shams al-Din Juvayni, a Persian statesman and member of the Juvayni family in 1269. He was an influential figure in early Ilkhanate politics, serving as Sahib-i divan (vizier and minister of finance) under four Mongol Ilkhans – Hulagu, Abaqa, Tekuder and Arghun Khan. He was the most powerful official of the Il-khanate. Khoshak was possibly looking for a powerful guarantor in the person of Shams al-Din Juvayni, as she was being left out of her father's inheritance following the remarriage of her mother Gvantsa with the king of Georgia David VII.

Khoshak moved to Persia in 1271—72, and lived there with her husband for 15 years. They had a daughter named Kuandze "Born from Princes" in Persian), who ultimately married the Armenian Prince Shahnshah II Zakarian, and two sons named Zakare and Atabeg. She returned to her father’s house with her children in 1285, after her husband was beheaded by the Mongol ruler in 1284.

Khoshak is known for leaving an inscription in Armenian at Garni Temple. The large Armenian inscription was left on entryway by Khoshak and her son, Amir Zakare, in 1291. It records the release of the people of Garni from taxes in the forms of wine, goats, and sheep.

Her son Atabeg died in 1289, and Zakare inherited his parents' estate.

== Sources ==
- Kitagawa, Sei-ichi'. The Rise of the Artsrunisand the rl-Kha-nid Rule over Georgia. The Historical Society of Japan.
- Dashdondog, Bayarsaikhan (2020). Armenian Lords and Mongol Court. Conference: Armenology in Mongolia.
- Dashdondog, Bayarsaikhan (2011). The Mongols and the Armenians (1220-1335) (PDF). Brill. ISBN 978-90-04-18635-4.
