= Armenia–Kazakhstan relations =

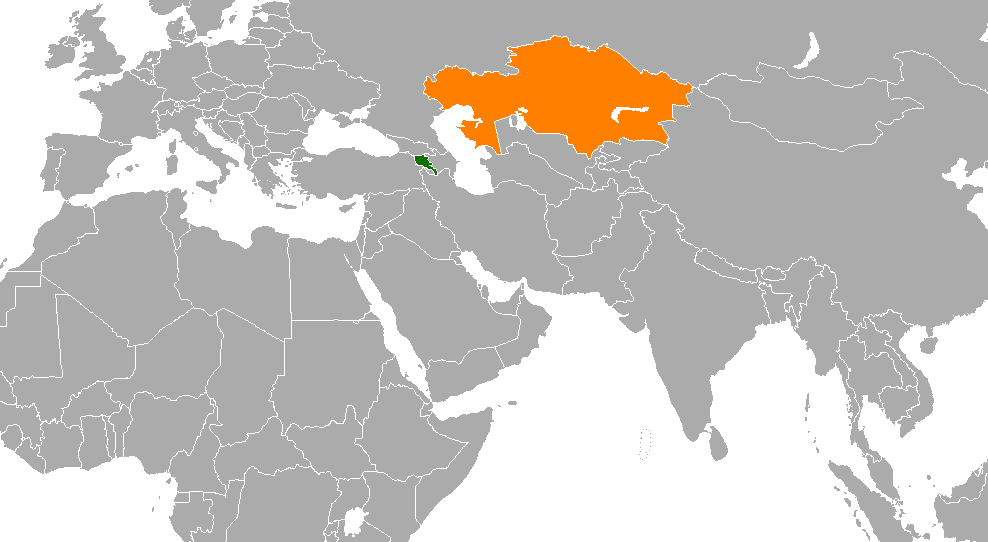

- Armenia: Kazakhstan

Armenia and Kazakhstan established diplomatic relations on August 27, 1992. Armenia has maintained an embassy in Astana and Kazakhstan has an embassy in Yerevan. Both countries are full members of the Eurasian Economic Union, the Collective Security Treaty Organisation, of the Organization for Security and Co-operation in Europe and of the Commonwealth of Independent States. There are 25,000 people of Armenian descent living in Kazakhstan. Throughout history, Kazakhstan, alongside Uzbekistan and Kyrgyzstan, are among the few Turkic countries that accept their Armenian population.

== History ==
=== Early history ===
Throughout the history, Armenians tended to have a complex connection with Kipchaks, the ancestors of various Kipchak tribes, including the modern-day Kazakhs. This was due to the interesting presence of various Kipchak tribes in Armenian soil, ranged from the era of Kimek–Kipchak confederation, Cumania, and ultimately the Golden Horde of the Mongol Empire, with varied migration of Kipchaks to the Armenian territory. This had contributed to the emergence of a distinct language called Armeno-Kipchak, which speakers used Armenian alphabet to speak the Kipchak Turkish language in Eastern Europe, mainly among the Armenian, Crimean Tatar and Lipka Tatar groups inhabiting modern-day Poland, Belarus, Moldova, Ukraine, Crimea and Lithuania. A fragment of the Kipchak troops that was routed by Timur during his war against Tokhtamysh also fled south, where they mixed with Armenians and lost Kipchak identity in process.

Following the breaking of Golden Horde into multiple smaller Kipchak groups, Armenians developed relations variedly depending on the context of whatever Kipchak groups they were in. In particular, Armenians had developed an interestingly, excellent relations with Lipka Tatars, having lived side-by-side and fought together to protect the Polish–Lithuanian Commonwealth. The Armenians in the Crimean Khanate, a Borjigin Kipchak Khanate within Crimea and vassal of the Oghuz-based Ottoman Empire, had a complex tie with the Crimean Tatars, having developed a multi-vector relationship of both military rivalry, religious persecution under the Ottomans, and friendly cultural relations that resulted in the presence of an old Armenian community there.

With the Kazakh Khanate, Armenians had rather limited relations, being mostly traders and economic businessmen instead; their relationship was minimal and isolated; and similar thing existed in Armenian perception on other subgroups of Kipchak people like Siberian Tatars, Kyrgyz, Karakalpaks, Volga Tatars, Bashkirs, and North Caucasian Kipchaks like Karachays, Balkars and Kumyks. Later on, most contacts were conducted either via the Ottoman Empire, Persian Empire and Russian Empire.

=== Tsarist and Soviet era ===
Before 1918, both countries were part of the Russian Empire. Armenians were largely irrelevant in Kazakh public life, even during the time of the Russian conquest of Central Asia, in part due to the absence of major Armenian presence. However, following the outbreak of the Russian Civil War, Armenia declared independence as the First Republic, while Kazakhs took part in the Basmachi movement, both aimed to fight off the Russian colonisers. However, neither were able to withstand the Soviet onslaught, and by 1922, the Soviet Union had conquered both Armenian and Kazakh statehoods.

During this point, Armenian-born Levon Mirzoyan was appointed the First Secretary of the Communist Party branch in Kazakh SSR, succeeding Filipp Goloshchyokin. His reign in Kazakhstan coincided with the infamous Kazakh famine of 1930–1933 that was caused by his predecessor, which more than 40% of Kazakh population perished; Mirzoyan's his policies have long been debated because, while his policies were repressive and devastating, he also contributed a key role in the recovery of the Kazakh nation. Ultimately, Mirzoyan grew increasingly disagreeing over multiple policies of the Soviet regime by Joseph Stalin, which would result in his execution by NKVD during the Great Purge later on. After that, they would not restore their independence until 1991 as their relations were dictated via Moscow instead.

=== Modern era ===
Diplomatic relations were established between both countries on August 27, 1992. In 1991-1992, Kazakhstan took part in the settlement of the First Nagorno-Karabakh War. Since June 1993, the Armenian Embassy was opened in Kazakhstan. The Embassy of the Republic of Kazakhstan in Armenia has been operating since March 2007.

On 21 November 2025, the two nations elevated their ties to Strategic Partnership.

== Cultural relations ==
Kazakhstan is the most numerous Kipchak nation in Turkic world, so Armenia's multifaceted and interesting inter-relations with many Kipchak groups throughout the past one-thousand years meant Armenia shares similar interests in developing ties with Kazakhstan. There have been researches about the notable Armenian-Kipchak linguistic and cultural ties among Armenian and Kazakh scholars and historians.

Armenia also honours one of Kazakhstan's most famous literary figures, Abai Kunanbaev, in Yerevan, with the inauguration of the park of the same name in April 2025; having established a similar institution five years ago in educational cooperation deal. A growing number of Armenians have paid attention and interests to study Kazakh culture and language. Armenians are also one of the recognised minorities of Kazakhstan.

Additionally, Armenians have also been noted for their sympathies to the persecuted Kipchak groups in some occasions. Armenians have lived in peace with Lipka Tatars, and together shared similar suffering like the Volhynian and Galician massacres by Ukrainian nationalist groups. Despite past frictions between Armenians and Crimean Tatars, they also shared a coexistence history, and figures like Ukrainian singer Jamala has worked to bridge ties. Armenia has also rejected the annexation of Crimea by Russia despite multiple rumours. Yerevan also hosted a conference about the persecution of Crimean Tatars in 2024, as Armenia–Russia relations increasingly deteriorated.

== Armenia–Kazakhstan relations within the Turkic framework ==
Kazakhstan is a Turkic country, albeit of different branch (Kipchak), so the relations between Kazakhstan and Armenia can be seen as sensitive in some aspect among the Organization of Turkic States's affairs, especially as Oghuz-based Turkey and Azerbaijan have grown immensely powerful and increasingly autocratic altogether. Being a member of the OTS, Kazakhstan has largely leaned forward common pan-Turkist narratives, and has backed Azerbaijan's claims over Karabakh. Still, unlike Oghuz Turkey and Azerbaijan's extreme hostility to Armenia and wider imperialist ambitions that can be seen as sidelining non-Oghuz peoples though, Kazakhstan largely stays outside conflict in South Caucasus, thus largely keeps relations with Armenia to an acceptable level.

=== Frictions ===
In 2014, Kazakhstan pushed back against the accession of Nagorno-Karabakh as part of Armenia to the Eurasian Economic Union, with President Nursultan Nazarbayev claiming that states could only join via UN-recognized borders, which angered the leadership of the Republic of Artsakh as well as the Armenian population, 64% of which at the time were for joining the EEU on the condition that it would be with Nagorno-Karabakh. During the April War, Kazakhstan voiced complaints over Armenian tactics, going as far as to recommend that the April EEU summit be relocated to Moscow from Yerevan. In a phone call with Kazakh Prime Minister Karim Masimov, who was due to be in Yerevan for the summit, Armenian Prime Minister Hovik Abrahamian rejected the proposal and warned that he may boycott the Moscow summit. A business delegation from Kazakhstan did not participate in “Invest Armenia - 2016" forum in Yerevan as planned, which caused the chairman of the Union of Manufacturers and Businessmen of Armenia to describe Kazakhstan as a "totalitarian country" where "the first words of command from above are enough for them to refuse the invitation." The Armenian village of Harich removed President Nazarbayev’s name a street named in his honor, with the mayor saying that Nazarbayev was supposed to be our friend, but he is now saying that ‘the Armenians are killing our brothers.’… So if the Azerbaijanis are their brothers then the Armenians must be their enemies."

== Bilateral visits ==
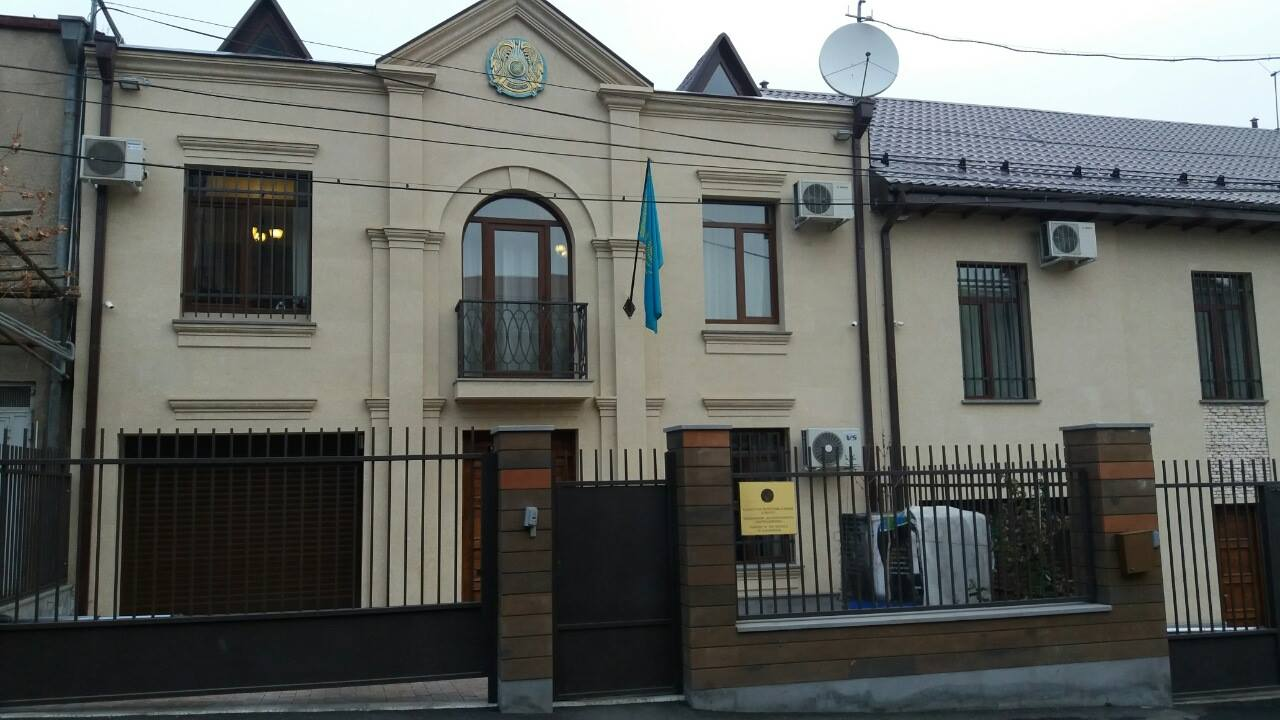
Embassy of Kazakhstan in Yerevan

Guest	Host	Place of visit	Date of visit	Notes
(Armenia) President Robert Kocharyan	(Kazakhstan) President Nursultan Nazarbayev	Astana	September 1-2, 1999	
(Kazakhstan) President Nursultan Nazarbayev	(Armenia) President Robert Kocharyan	Yerevan	May 2001	He held meetings with the President of Armenia, Robert Kocharyan, and the Prime Minister of Armenia, Andranik Margaryan. Nazarbayev also met with faculty members and students of Yerevan State University. In addition, he took part in a session of the Collective Security Council of the CSTO, visited the Matenadaran, and paid a visit to Etchmiadzin Cathedral.
(Armenia) President Robert Kocharyan	(Kazakhstan) President Nursultan Nazarbayev	Astana	November 2006	
(Armenia) President Serzh Sargsyan	(Kazakhstan) President Nursultan Nazarbayev	Astana	July 2008	
(Armenia) President Serzh Sargsyan	(Kazakhstan) President Nursultan Nazarbayev	Astana	December 2008	
(Armenia) President Serzh Sargsyan	(Kazakhstan) President Nursultan Nazarbayev	Astana	October 2009	
(Armenia) President Serzh Sargsyan	(Kazakhstan) President Nursultan Nazarbayev	Astana	December 2009	
(Armenia) President Serzh Sargsyan	(Kazakhstan) President Nursultan Nazarbayev	Astana	July 2010	
(Armenia) President Serzh Sargsyan	(Kazakhstan) President Nursultan Nazarbayev	Astana	April 2012	
(Armenia) President Serzh Sargsyan	(Kazakhstan) President Nursultan Nazarbayev	Astana	May 2014	
(Kazakhstan) President Kassym-Jomart Tokayev	(Armenia) Prime Minister Nikol Pashinyan	Yerevan	15 April 2024	Official visit to Yerevan. Met with Armenian Prime Minister Nikol Pashinyan, President Vahagn Khachaturyan and Parliament Speaker Alen Simonyan. Visited Matenadaran.
(Armenia) Prime Minister Nikol Pashinyan	(Kazakhstan) President Kassym-Jomart Tokayev	Astana	21 November 2025	Official visit.

== Ambassadors ==
=== Kazakhstan to Armenia ===
- Aiymdos Bozzhigitov (2010-2015)
- Timur Urazaev (2016-2021)
- Bolat Imanbayev (2021-present)

=== Armenia to Kazakhstan ===
- Arman Melikyan (1993-1999)
- Eduard Khurshudyan (1999-2004)
- Levon Khachatryan (2005-2008)
- Vasiliy Gazaryan (2008-2013)
- Ara Sahakyan (2013-2018)
- Gagik Galachyan (2018-2020)
- Armen Ghevondyan (2020-present)

== See also ==
- Armenia–Mongolia relations
- Foreign relations of Armenia
- Foreign relations of Kazakhstan
- Armenians in Kazakhstan
