= Harich Monastery =

Armenian monastery

Harichavank Հառիճավանք
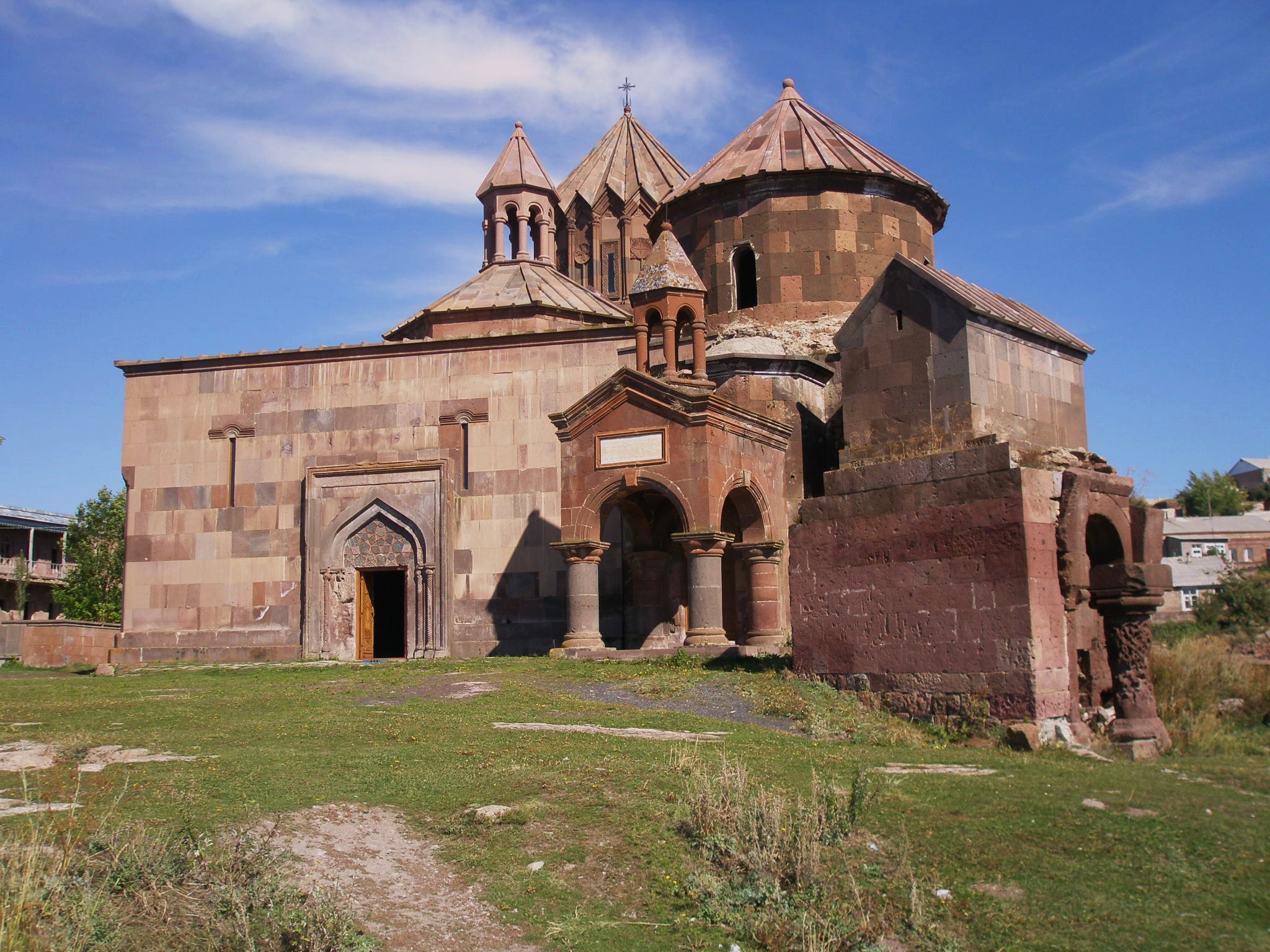
- Rear view of the monastery.

- Location within Armenia Location within Shirak

Religion
- Affiliation: Armenian Apostolic Church

Location
- Location: Harich, Shirak Province, Armenia
- Coordinates: 40.606464°N 43.999422°E

Architecture
- Style: Armenian
- Completed: 7th century, 13th century

The Harichavank (Armenian: Հառիճավանք; transliterated as Harijavank or Harichavank) is a 7th-century Armenian monastery located near the village of Harich (Armenian: Հառիճ) in the Shirak Province of Armenia. The village is 3 km southeast of the town of Artik.

== History ==
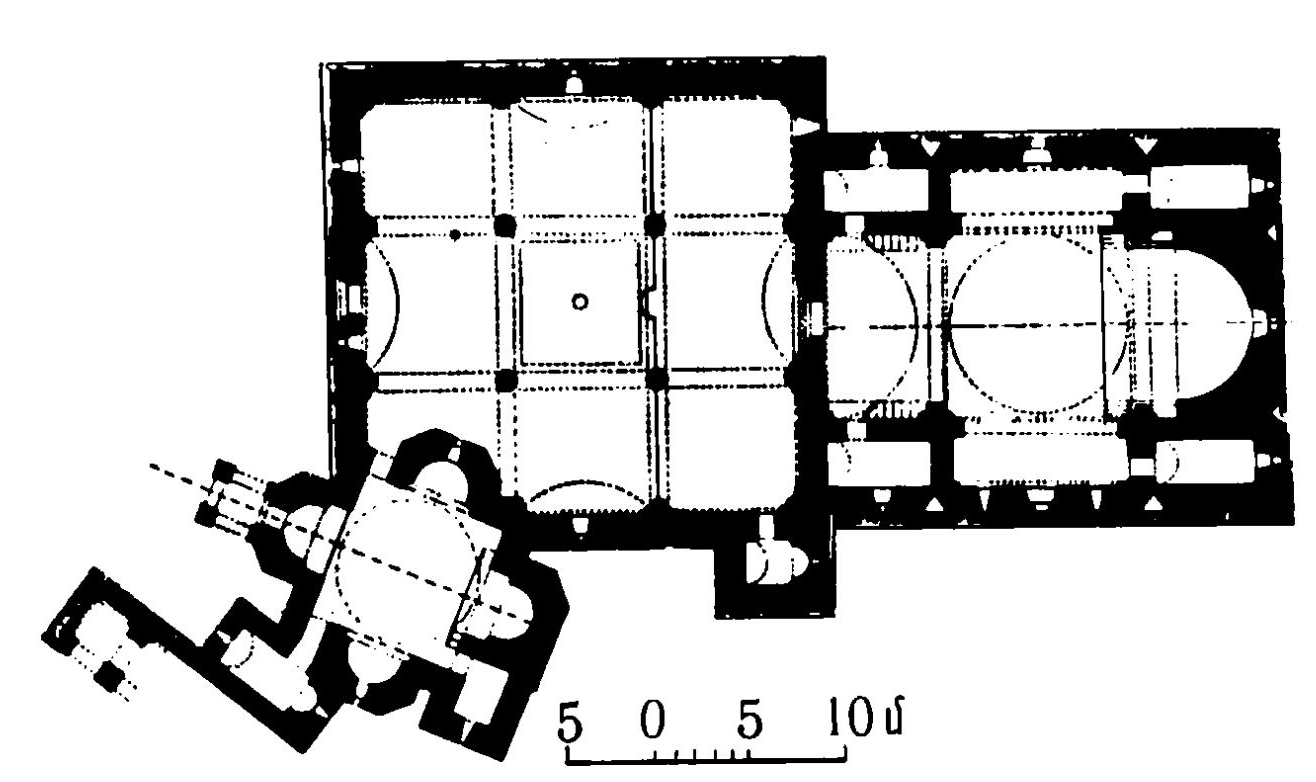
Plan of Harichavank

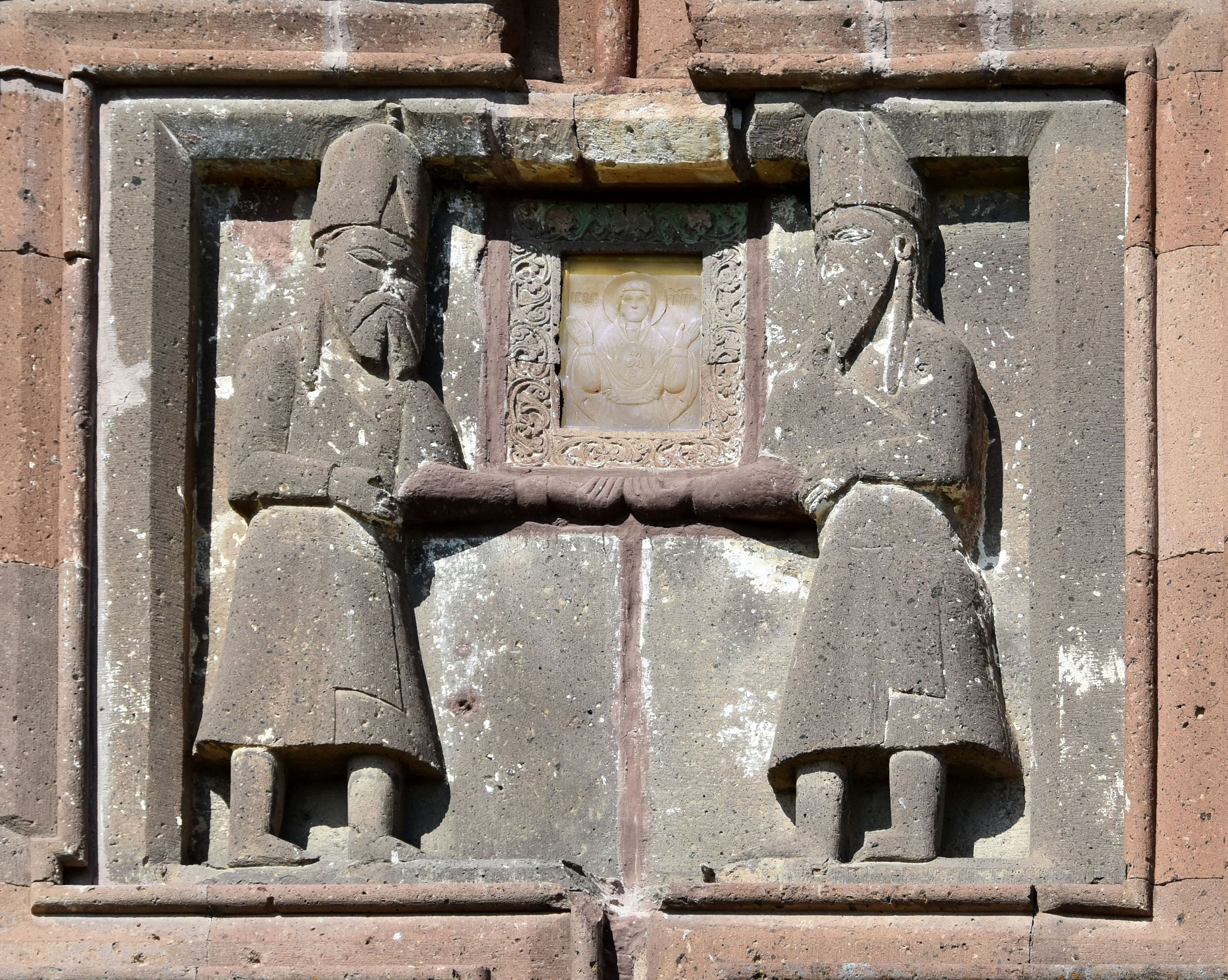
Zakare II and Ivane I on the east facade at Harichavank, Armenia, 1201. They wear the contemporary costume, with tall sharbush hat and kaftans.

Harichavank is known as one of the most famous monastic centers in Armenia, and it was especially renowned for its school and scriptorium. Archaeological excavations of 1966 indicate that Harich was in existence during the 2nd century BC, and was one of the more well-known fortress towns in Armenia.

The oldest part of this Armenian monastery is the Church of St. Gregory the Enlightener (Սբ. Գրիգոր Լուսավորիչ); it is a domed structure that is usually placed in the category of so-called "Mastara-style" churches (named after the fifth century church of St. Hovhannes in the village of Mastara, in the southern part of Shirak). The founding date of the monastery is unknown, but it was probably built no later than the 7th century, when St. Gregory was erected.

Harichavank was occupied and modified by the Kipchak Turks from 1120 to 1191, but the Zakarides restored the traditional decoration when they restored sovereignty after 1191. The Cathedral of the Holy Mother of God (Սբ. Աստվածածին) that dominates the monastic complex was built by the orders of Zakare Zakarian, Amirspasalar (commander-in-chief) and Prince who ruled Eastern Armenia in the 13th century together with his brother Ivane Zakarian, and completed in 1201. Prince Zakare started the cathedral after he bought Harich from a family representing the Pahlavuni dynasty. The narthex or zhamatun was built soon after, before 1219, by a vassal of the Zakarids, Vahram.

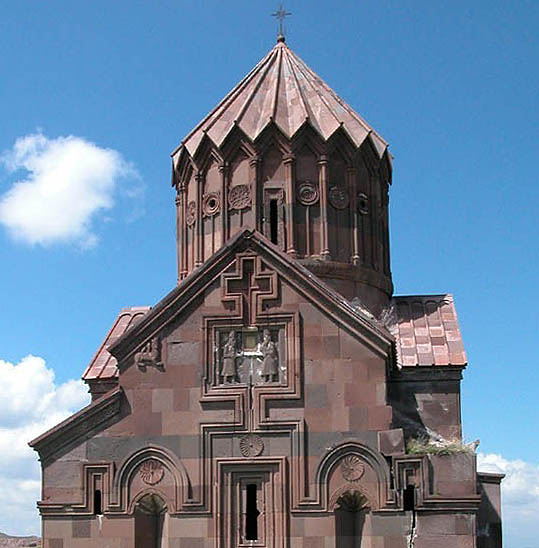
Cathedral of the Holy Mother of God, Harichavank Monastery (1201)

The cathedral is a cruciform church with two-story sacristies in each of the four extensions of the building. The tall 20-hedral drum of the cupola is of original style. Initially tent-roofed, it acquired triple columns on its facets and large rosettes in the piers, which, together with platbands, form an unusual decorative girder around the middle of the drum height. Later, the cupola drum of the Gandzasar Monastery (1216–1238) was decorated in the same way.

The eastern facade of the cathedral features a relief carving depicting the Zakarian brothers holding a model of the cathedral in their hands. This theme can be found in many other Armenian churches of the time e.g. on the Memorial Cathedral of the Dadivank Monastery in Nagorno Karabakh, as well as on the main churches of the Sanahin and Haghartsin monasteries in Armenia. This relief was covered in 1895 with a marble plaque featuring Madonna; when the plaque was removed, the original carving showed beneath.

Haritchavank's cathedral belongs to the category of "Gandzasar-style" ecclesiastical edifices that were built approximately at the same time in different parts of Armenia, and were endowed with similar compositional and decorative characteristics (another example—cathedral of the Hovhannavank Monastery). Those include an umbrella-shaped dome, a cruciform floor plan, narthex (often with stalactite-ornamented ceiling), and a high-relief of a large cross on one of the church's walls.

The privileges granted by the princes to the monastery contributed to its becoming a large cultural and enlightenment center of medieval Armenia. At the end of the 12th and the beginning of the 13th century, two monumental gavits (narthexes) were built of big stones, some measuring 3.5 meters. The larger narthex (gavit) is adjacent to the western facade of the cathedral and is linked to the northern apse of the Church of St. Gregory. It is a rectangular building supported by four pillars, with a stalactite carving in the central part of the ceiling.

Over 800 years, the monastery was repeatedly reconstructed. Damages inflicted on it were repaired, and small annexes and chapels were added to it at various times. The largest of these dates back to the second half of the 19th century, when Harich was made the summer audience of the Katholikos of Echmiadzin in 1850. The monastery grounds expanded northwards and were encircled with walls and towers. New one- and two-storey structures were erected: Katholikos’ offices, a refectory with a kitchen and a bakery, a school, a hostel for monks and disciples, an inn, stores, and cattlesheds. Greenery was planted in the yards.

South of the monastery, on a cliff, stands the Hermitage Chapel. In the cemetery, there are ruins of a small single-nave basilica of the fifth century with annexes on the sides of the altar apse and interesting tombstones with ornamented slabs dating from the 5th–6th centuries (now at Armenia's State History Museum in Yerevan).

== Gallery ==
Harichavank

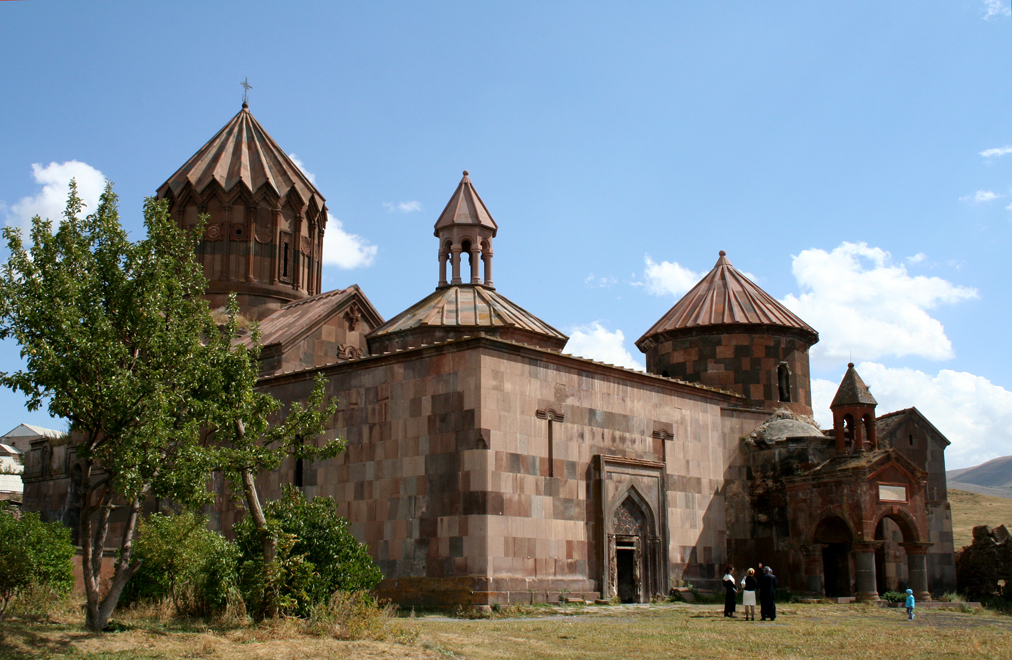
View of the monastery from the side of the zhamatun

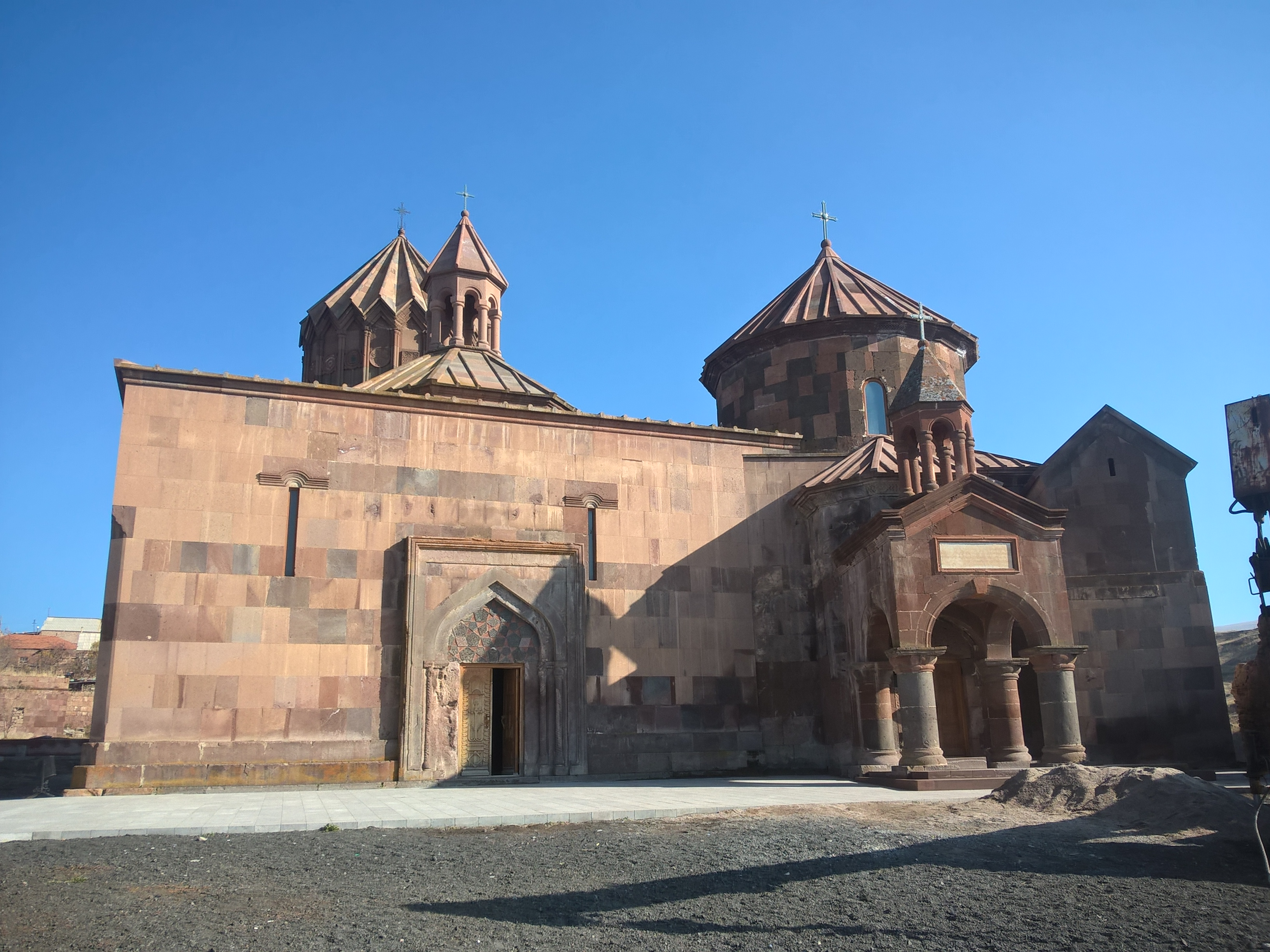
The zhamatun

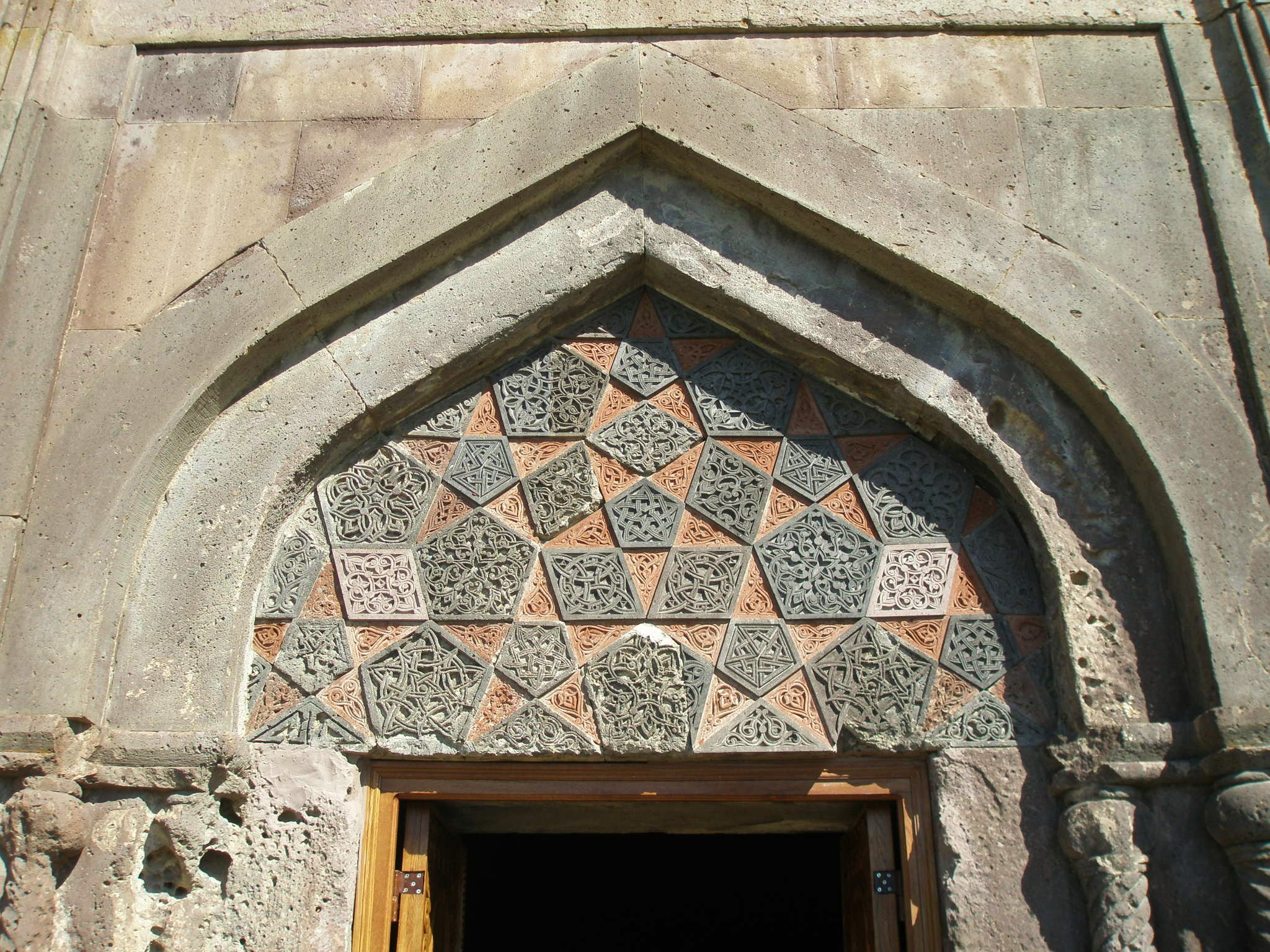
Intricately detailed tympanum above the portal of the zhamatun, an adaptation of Seljukid ablaq stonework

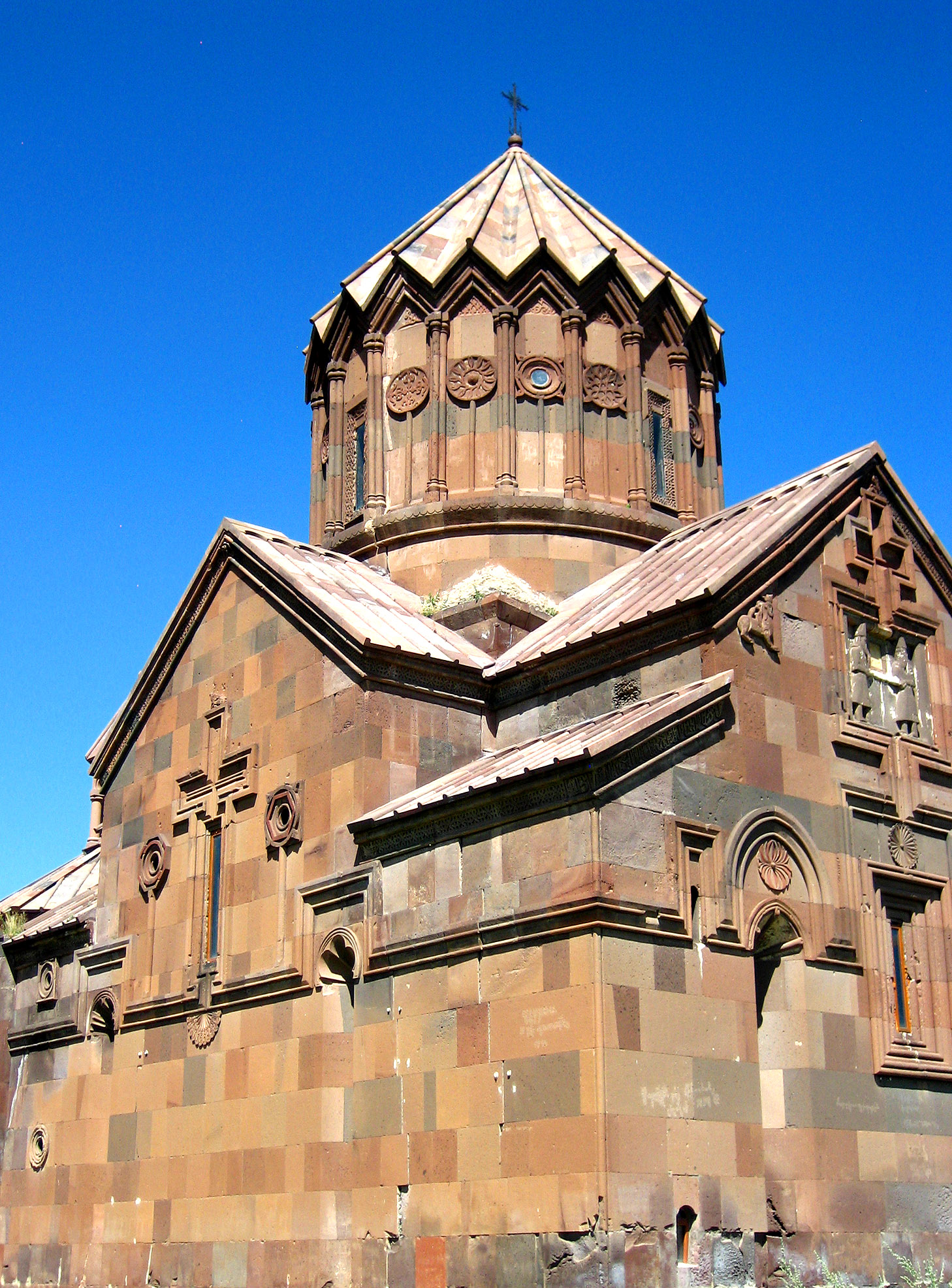
Church of the Holy Mother of God (1201)

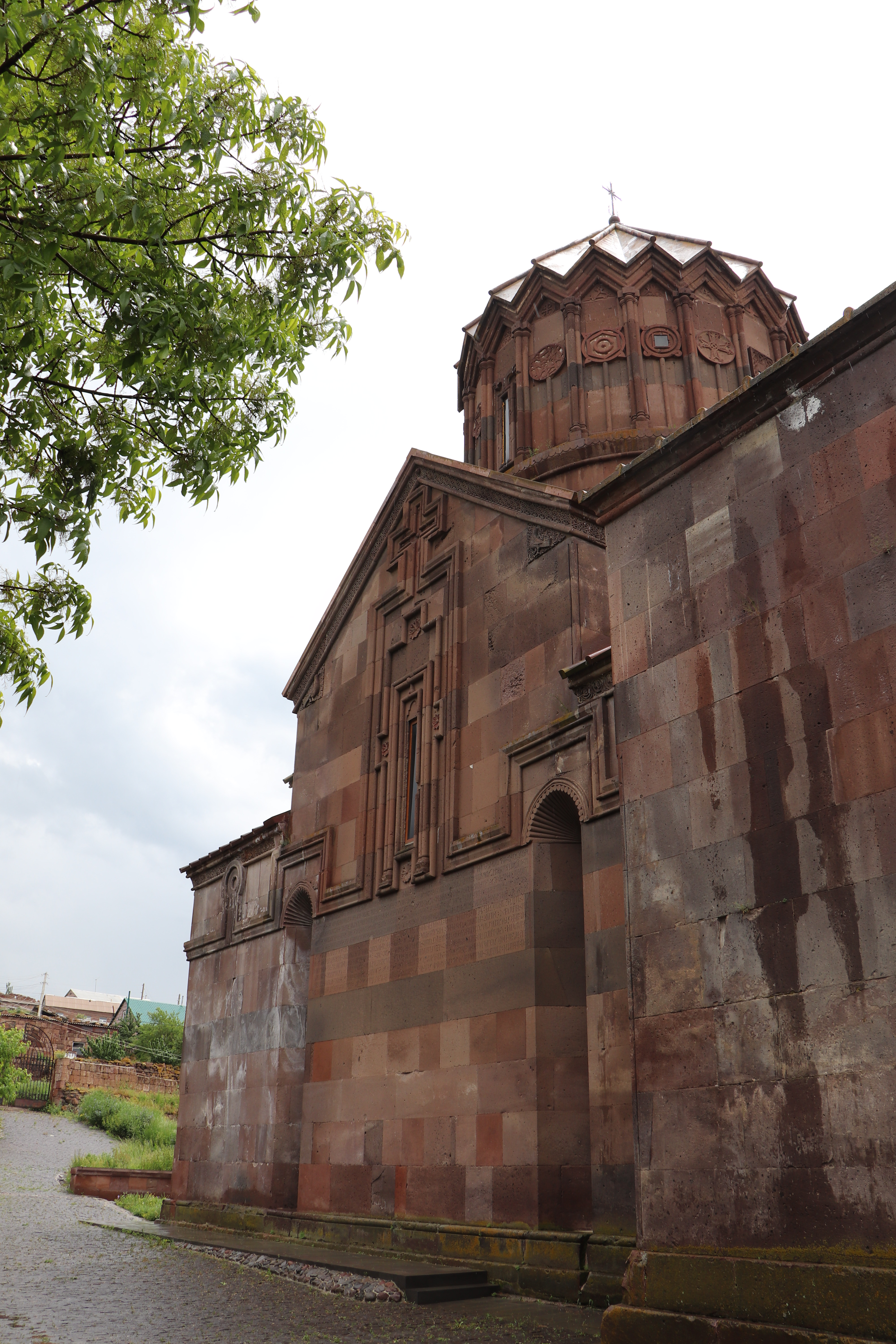

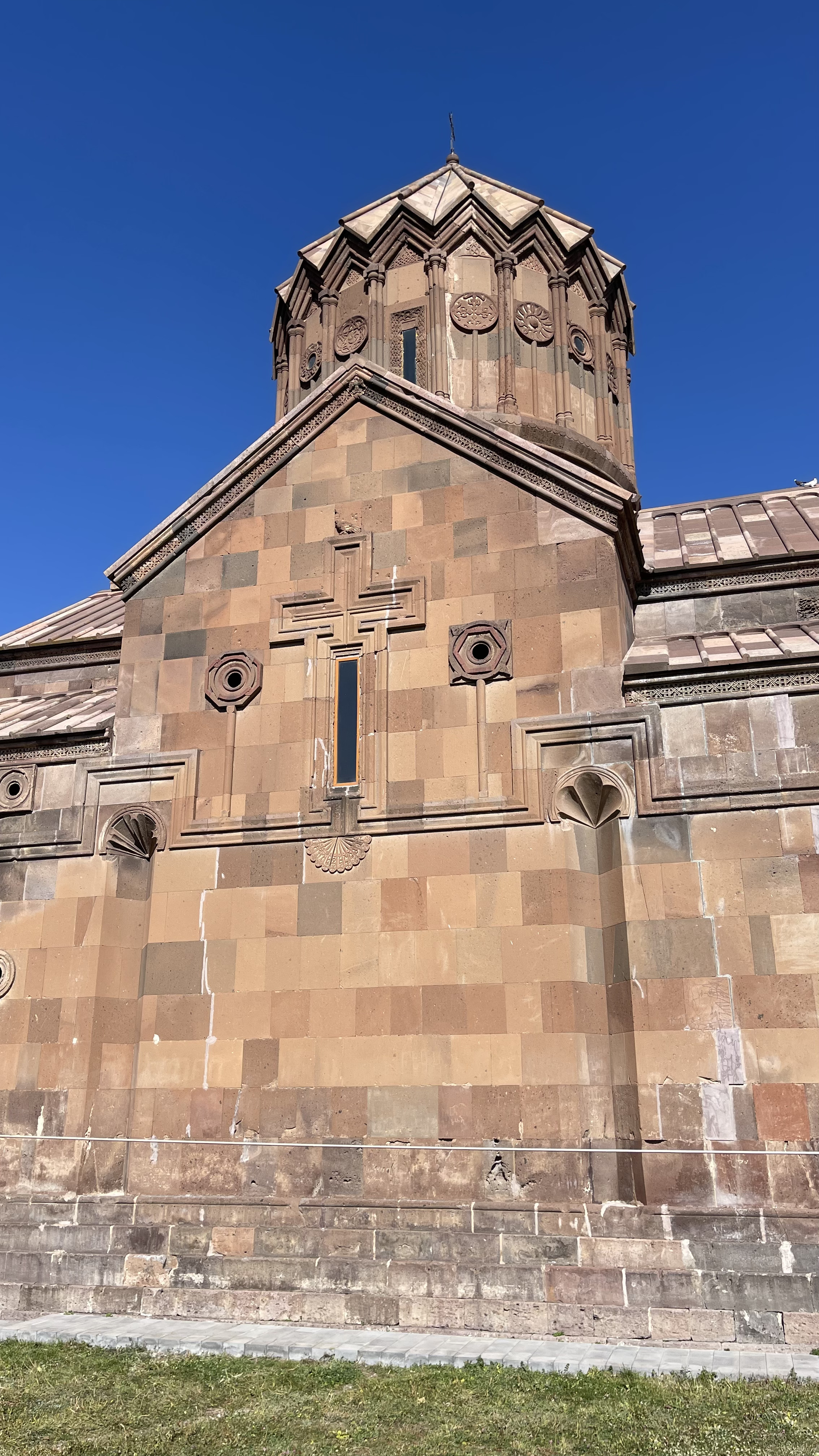

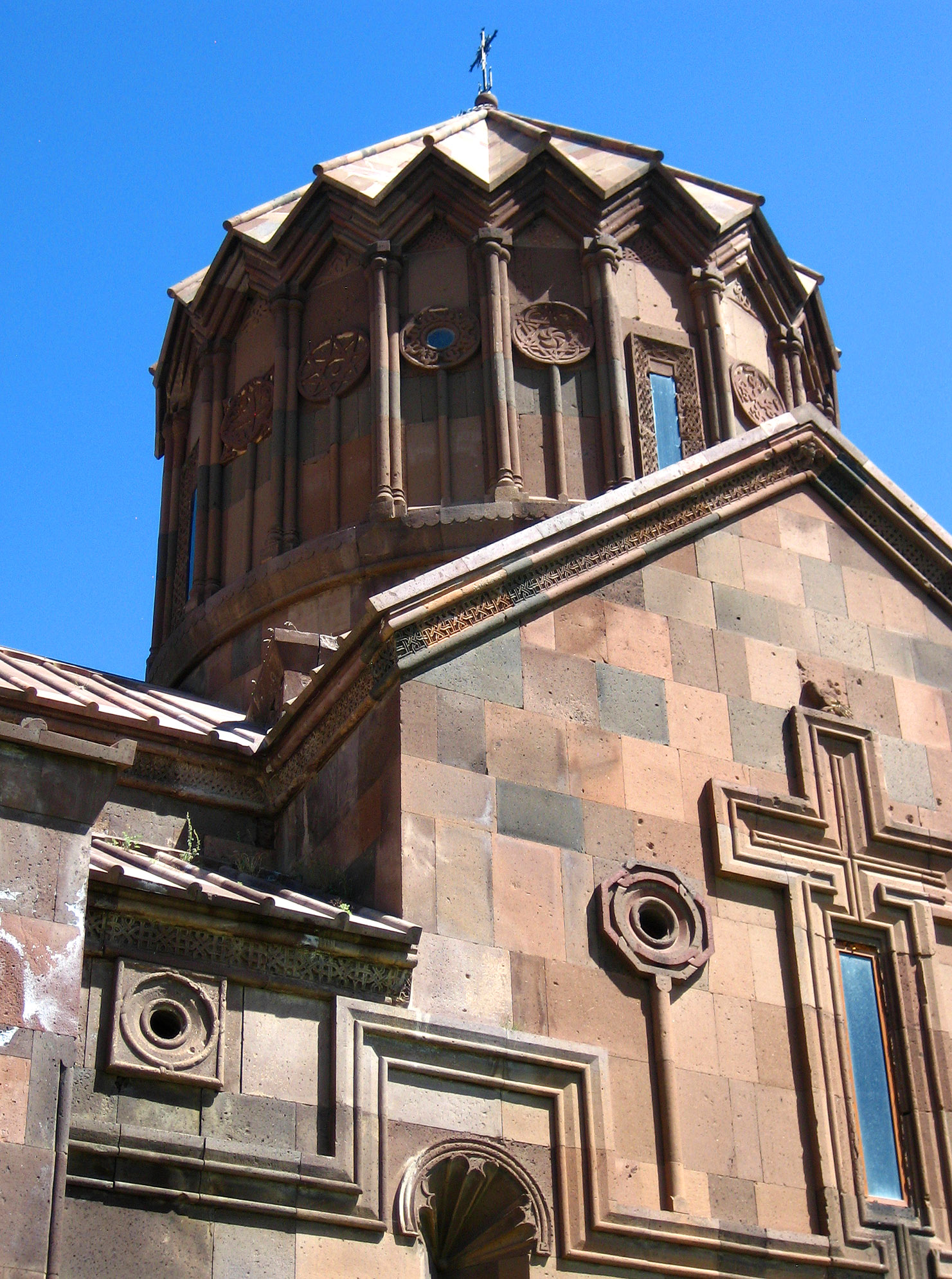
Dome of church of the Holy Mother of God (1201)

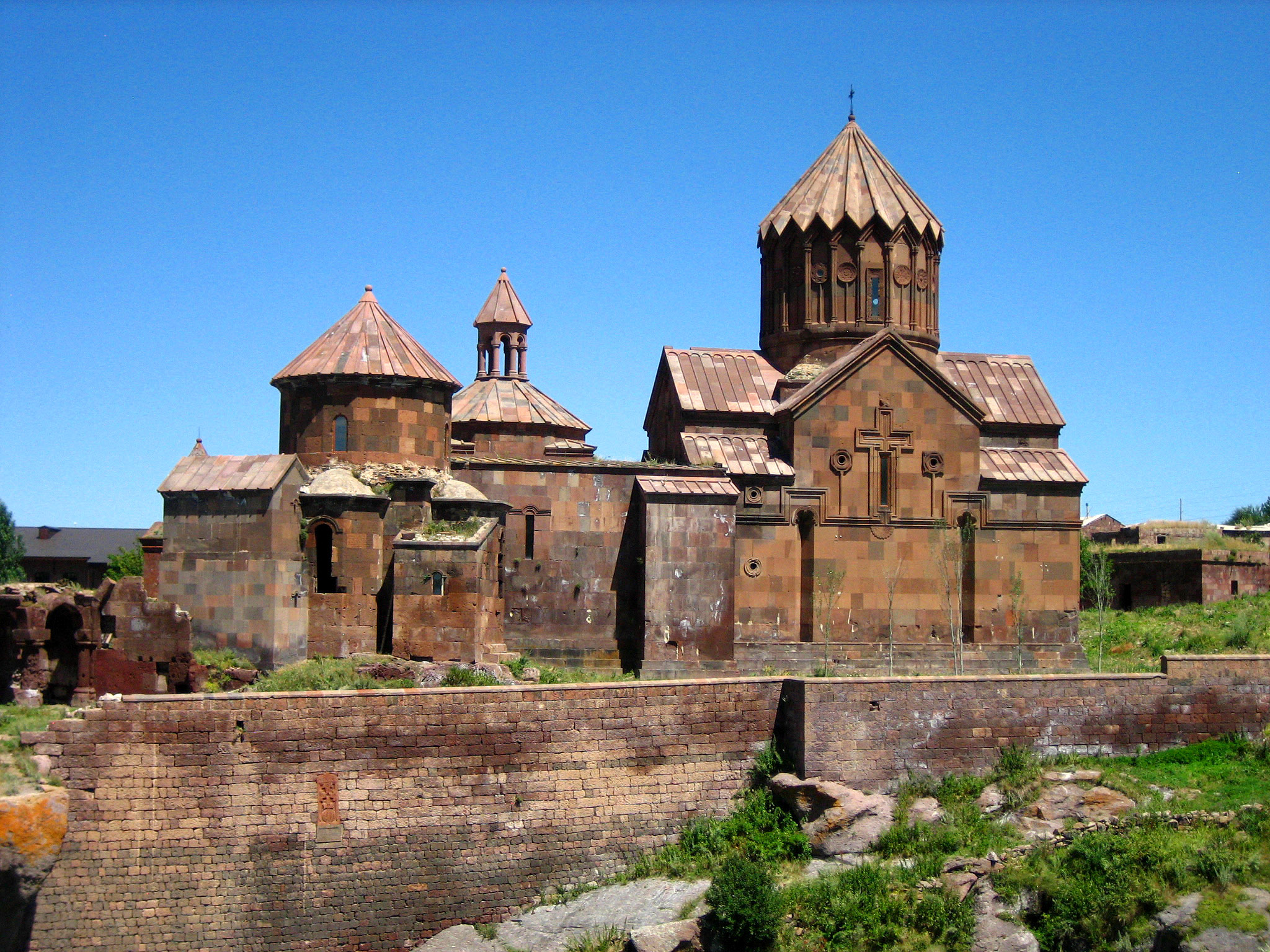
Harichavank, general view

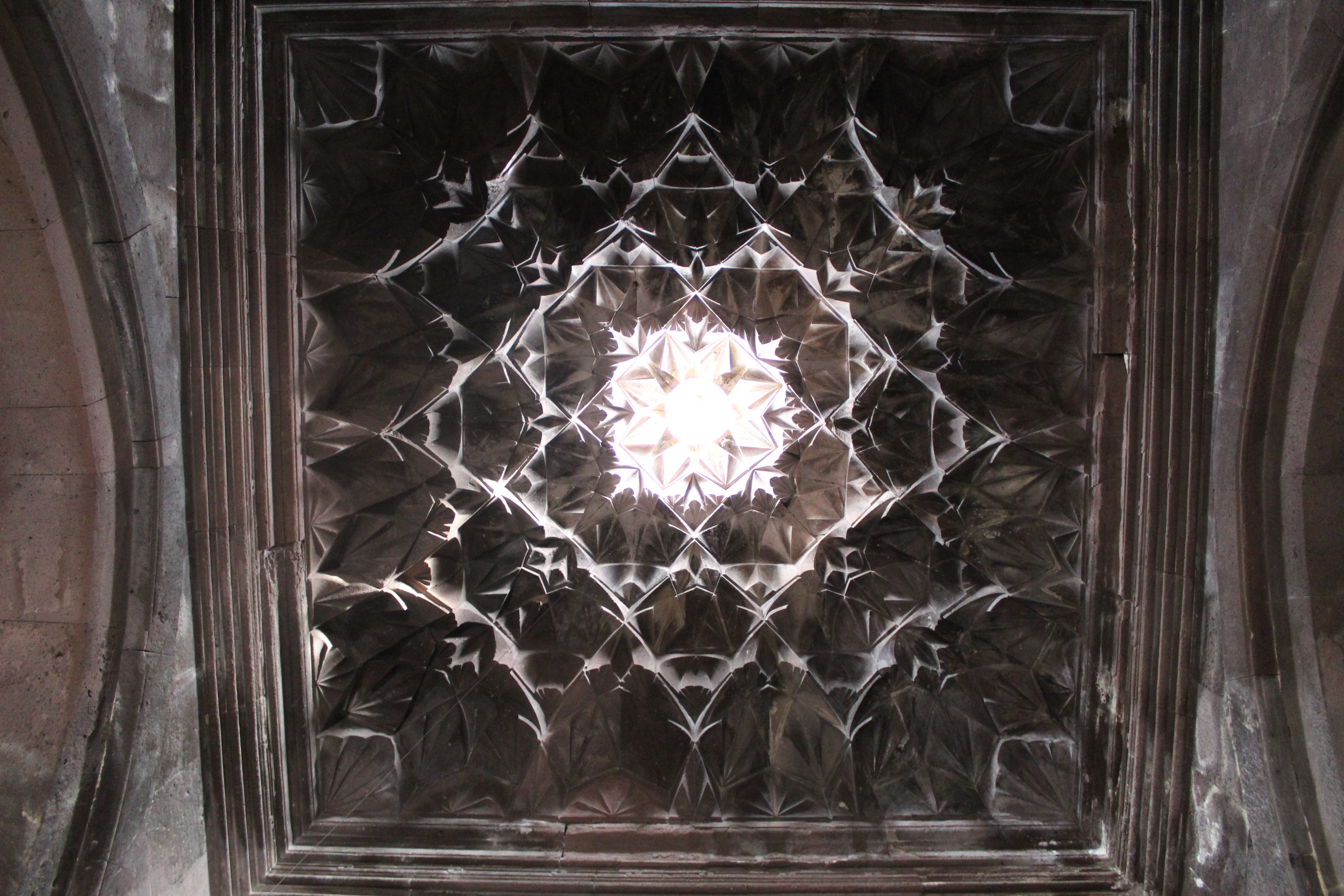
Muqarnas-type of roof in Harichavank

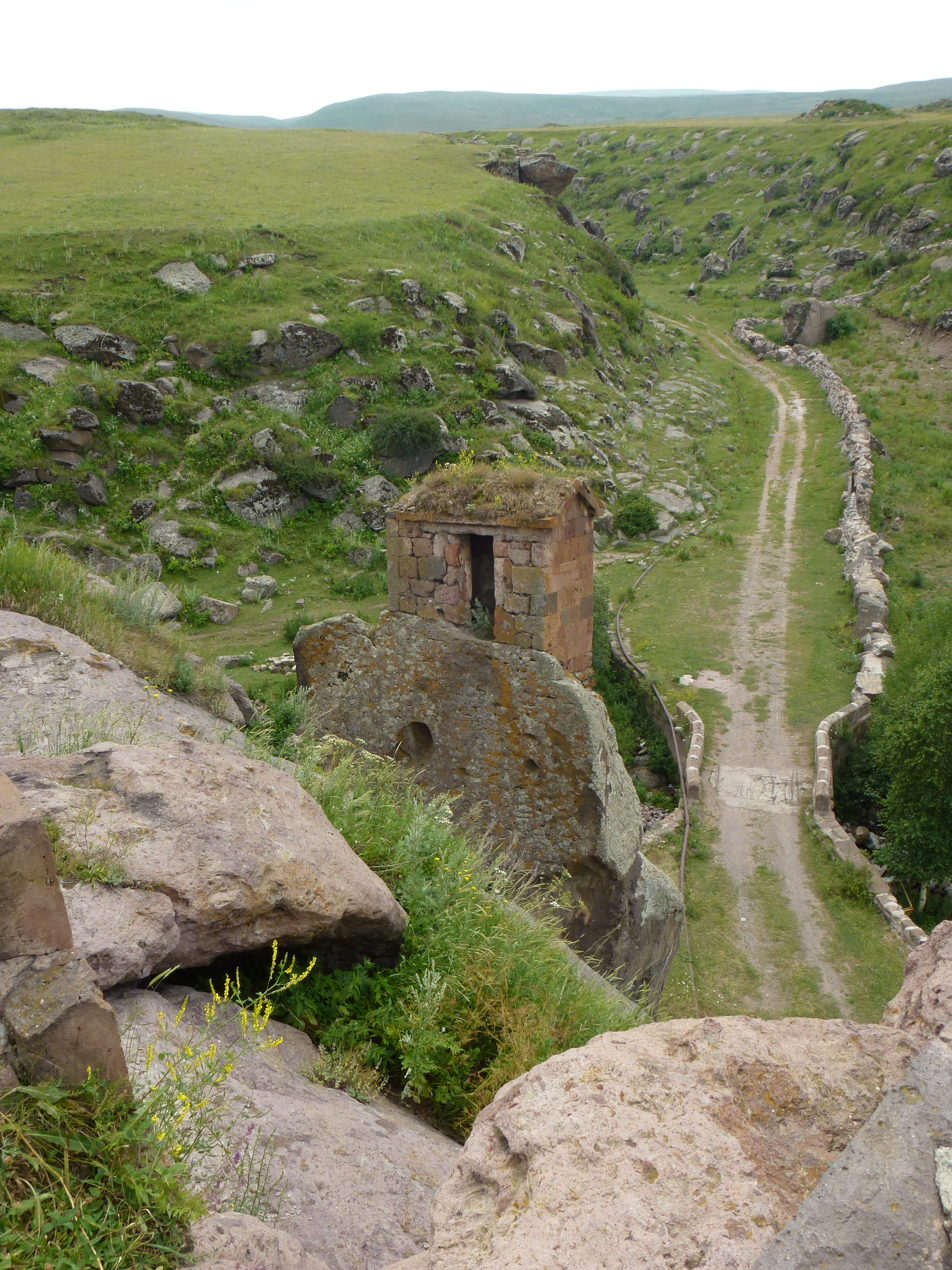
Jignavori or Hermitage chapel

== Bibliography ==
- Armenia: 1700 years of Christian Architecture. Moughni Publishers, Yerevan, 2001
- Tom Masters and Richard Plunkett. Georgia, Armenia & Azerbaijan, Lonely Planet Publications; 2nd edition (July 2004)
- Nicholas Holding. Armenia with Nagorno Karabagh, Bradt Travel Guides; 2th edition (October 2006)
