= Armenia–Mongolia relations =

- Armenia: Mongolia

Armenia and Mongolia established formal relations with each other on 21 February 1992, following the fall of communism in both countries. Both do not have embassies in respective capitals, but Armenia does have an Honorary Consulate in Ulaanbaatar while Mongolian embassy is accredited from Moscow, Russia.

== Historical relations ==
The relations between Armenia and Mongolia began during the 13th century, when the Mongol Empire conquered a vast chunk of Eurasian territory from Korea to the Balkans, in which Armenia was also conquered. With the Armenian nation largely fell to Mongol hand, Armenia became an effective vassal for the Mongol rulers for over a century. The Mongols also helped introducing Buddhism to Armenia, though it was not taken in grassroot basic. Within this span, Armenian rulers, acting as vassal for the Mongols and later Ilkhanate, had called for a coalition against the Mamluks among the Christian Crusaders and the Mongols. Another Mongol realm, the Golden Horde, also received substantial migration from the Kipchaks, who were the Mongolised Turkic people of the steppe, alongside Mongols. Once the Mongol realms in Persia and Central Asia fell, connection between them was limited.

During the 17th century, as Armenia was under the divided control of the Ottoman Empire and Safavid Empire, the Etchmiadzin Cathedral housed an interesting Tibetan bell that was believed to be produced during the era of the Oirat Mongol-led Khoshut Khanate in Tibet; the bell had vanished during the Soviet persecution at the 1930s, and its whereabout remains unknown to even today.

George Gurdjieff, an Armenian philosopher who introduced the Fourth Way practise, was deeply influenced by Tibetan Buddhism, which is also the main religious sect of the majority Mongols.

== Today ==
Today, Armenia and Mongolia are increasingly developing in studies and cooperation, as well as exploration of the past between the two nations, especially during the era of the Mongol conquest earlier, and Mongol interactions with Armenian entities.

At the same time, trade relations between both two states have also been expanded, and Mongolia is regarded as the growing market for Armenian goods to enter. In 2024, the two signed a major Trade Agreement. In 2025, Armenia approved a temporary free trade agreement with Mongolia via the Eurasian Economic Union framework. Representatives of Armenia and Mongolia also met in September 2025 during the Shanghai Cooperation Organization.

Additionally, both Armenia and Mongolia also established visa-free travel regime to increase connectivity between the two states.

== See also ==
- Armenia–Kazakhstan relations
- Foreign relations of Armenia
- Foreign relations of Mongolia
