= Harich, Armenia =

Harich Հառիճ
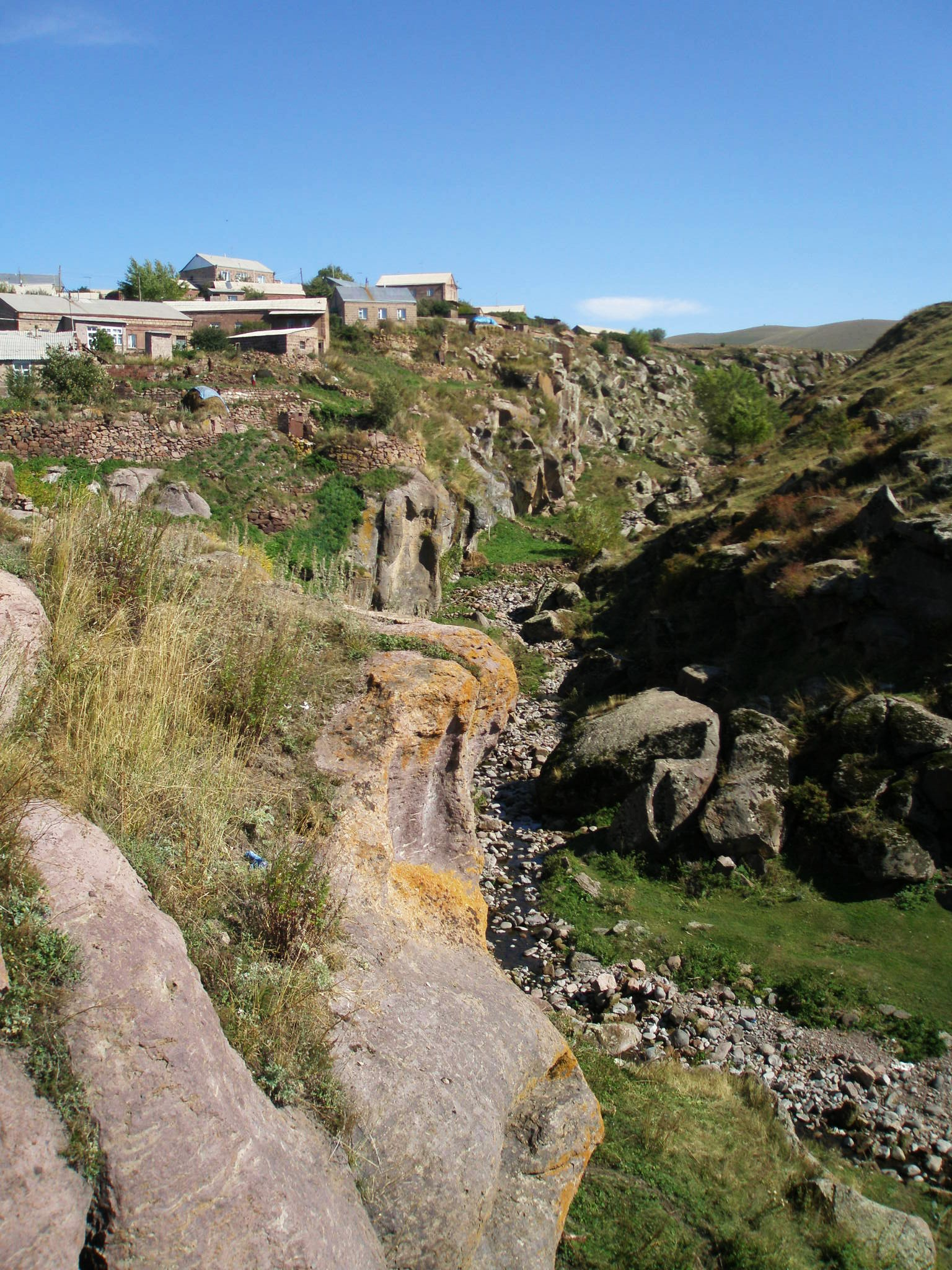
- The village of Harich and the gorge below as seen from Harichavank.

- Location within Armenia Location within Shirak
- Coordinates: 40°35′53″N 44°00′27″E
- Country: Armenia
- Province: Shirak
- Municipality: Artik

Area
  - Total: 1.08 km^{2} (0.42 sq mi)
- Elevation: 2,020 m (6,630 ft)

Population (2011)
  - Total: 1,535
- Time zone: UTC+4
  - Summer (DST): UTC+5

Harich (Armenian: Հառիճ) is a village in the Artik Municipality of the Shirak Province of Armenia. Within the village is the Harichavank Monastery of the 8th century. Across the gorge from the monastery is a 3rd millennium BC fortress and tomb field.

== Demographics ==
Historical population
Year	Pop.	±% p.a.
1831	86	—
1887	654	+3.69%
1926	880	+0.76%
1939	1,035	+1.26%
1959	1,958	+3.24%
1970	1,096	−5.14%
1979	1,058	−0.39%
2001	1,123	+0.27%
2011	1,535	+3.17%

== Gallery ==
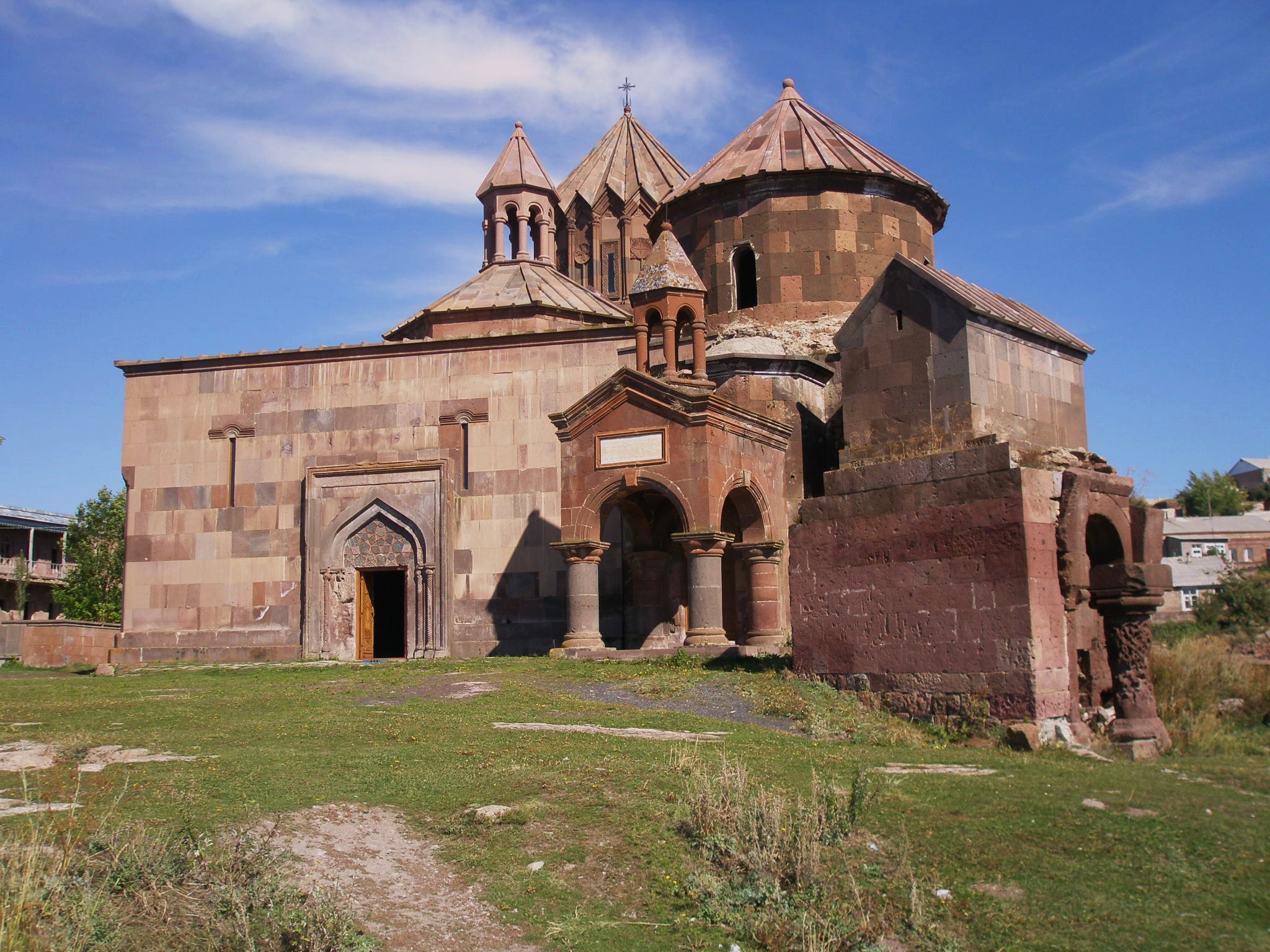
Rear view of 7th century Harichavank Monastery

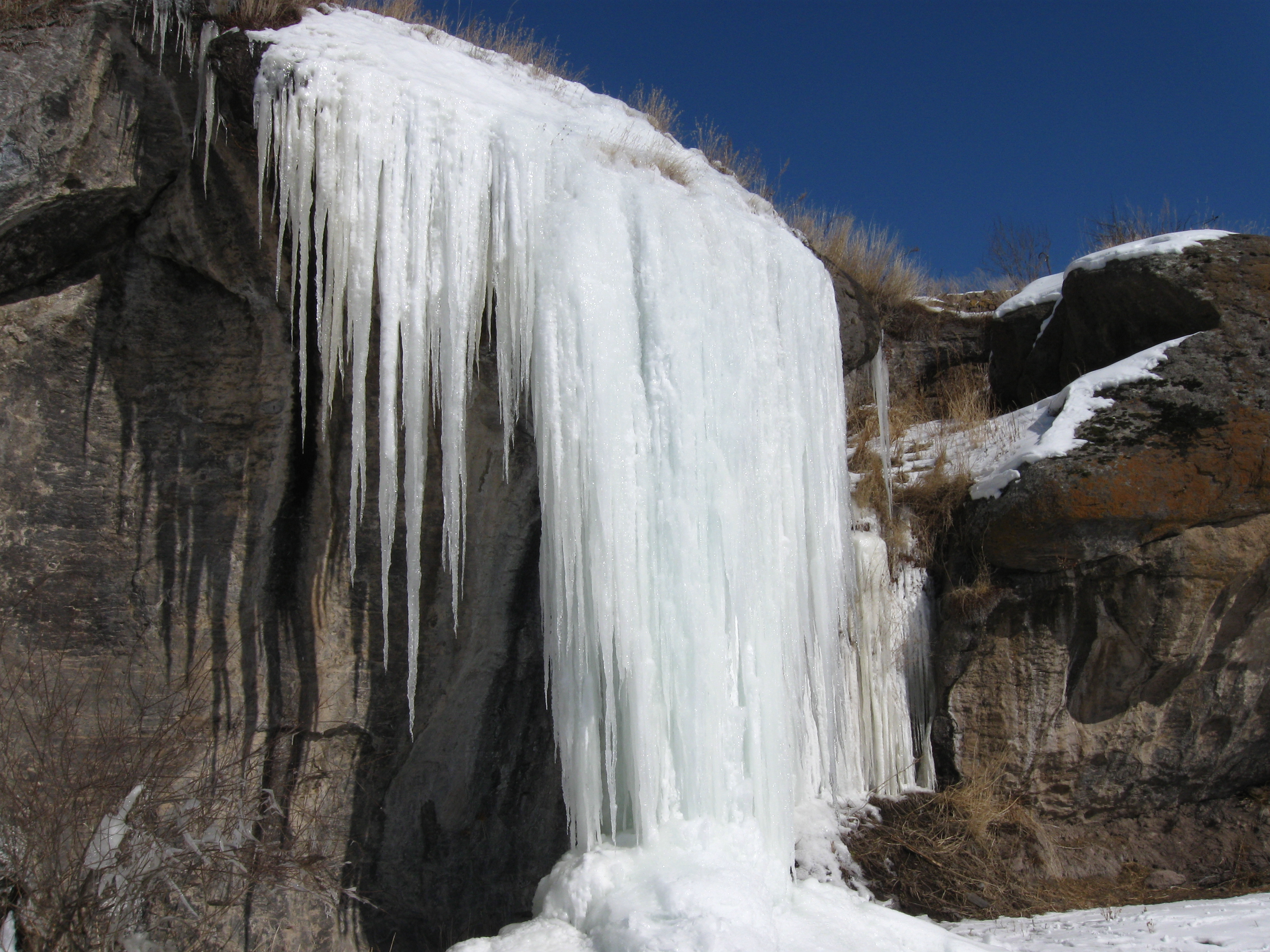
Frozen waterfalls

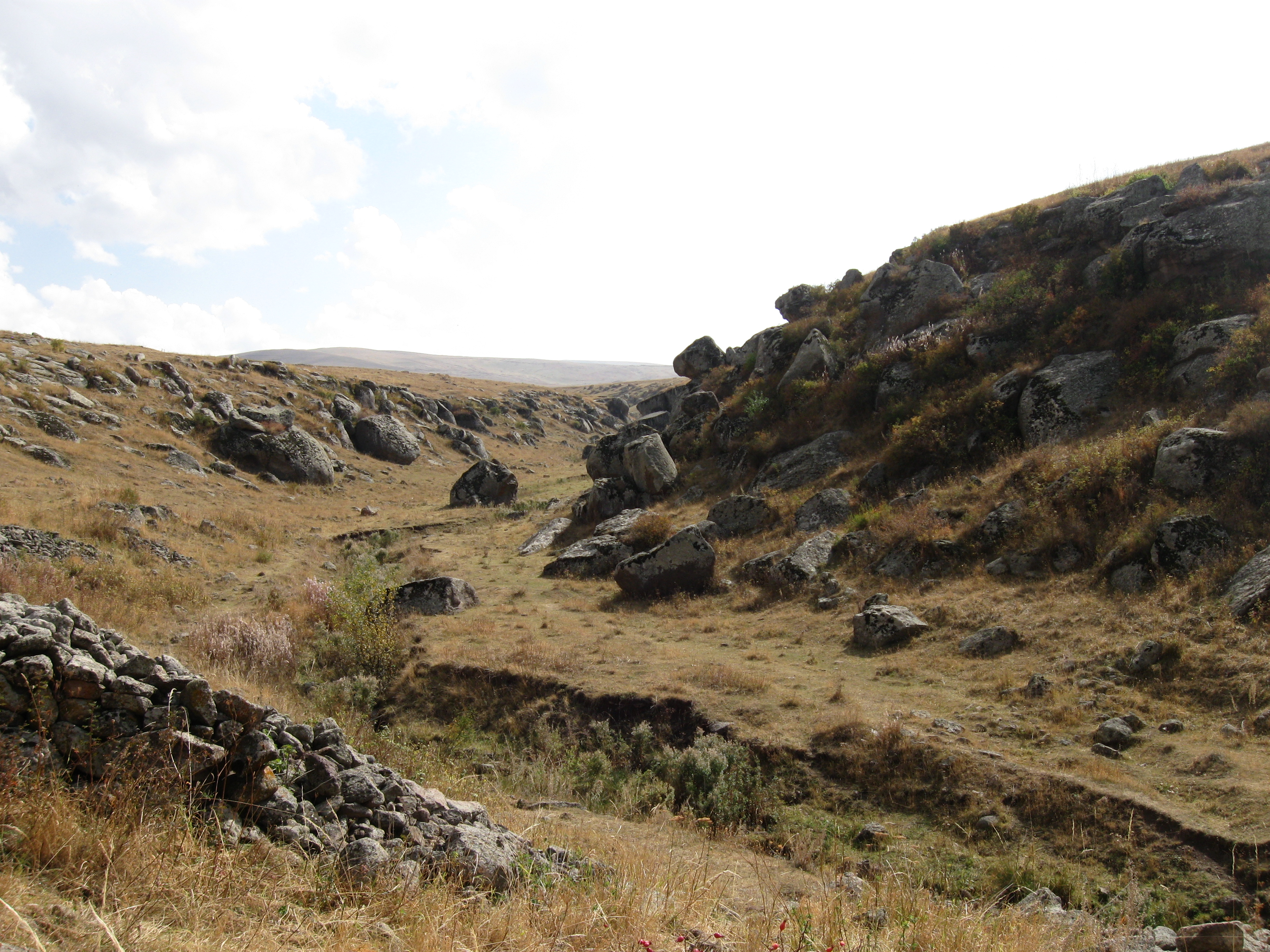
Field in Harich
